= Cereal Research Centre =

The Cereal Research Centre was a research institute established in 1925 based at the University of Manitoba in Winnipeg. It became part of a national network of research centres operated by Agriculture and Agri-Food Canada. Its research led to the development of over two hundred varieties of plant species resistant to pests and blights and producing high yields suitable for cultivation in the Canadian Prairies.

Its closure was announced in the 2012 federal budget, and ultimately executed in April 2014.

== Background ==
In the late 1910s and early 1920s, Canada experienced several outbreaks of stem rust Puccinia graminis, particularly on wheat, the nation's staple agricultural product.

In response to these outbreaks, in 1925 the Government of Canada established the Dominion Rust Research Laboratory at the University of Manitoba in Winnipeg. William Richard Motherwell, the Minister of Agriculture, invited Margaret Newton to help manage the newly opened laboratory. She accepted and was appointed the laboratory's senior plant pathologist, a position she maintained until retirement.

Newton established an annual stem rust survey for Western Canada, discovering a diversity of races in rust populations, which eventually enabled her to discover and catalogue the wheat species and cross-species resistant to stem rust.

== Research ==
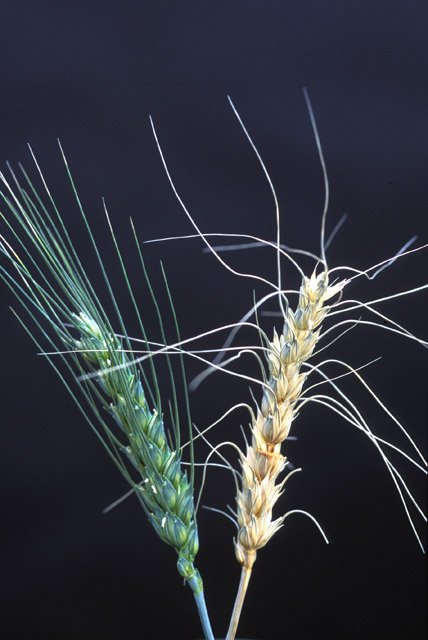
The Cereal Research Centre developed genetic markers to identify fusarium ear blight, symptoms of which appear on the wheat head on the right.

The research centre was part of a national research network operated by Agriculture and Agri-Food Canada.

Among the research activities performed at the centre were studies on breeding of oat and wheat, quality improvements on cereal grain stocks, and disease and pest resistance. Its scope consisted of cereal development including the identification of genes having economic value, registration of varieties, and prediction and mitigation of pests during storage and processing. This led to the production of "high-yielding, disease-resistant varieties that are well-adapted to Canadian prairie growing conditions".

Testing of varieties was conducted at the Morden Research Station in Morden and at a research field in Glenlea.

Among the varieties released by the research centre during its lifetime were two barley, 14 field pea, 17 flax, 22 oat, and 27 wheat, as well as 53 fruit tree varieties and 123 ornamental plant varieties. About 50% of all wheat and oat sown in Canada are varieties developed at the Cereal Research Centre, representing about $2.5 billion of harvestable cereal commodities.

The centre developed novel methods for pest control, such as using pea proteins to deter insect infestations in stored grains, and identification of genetic markers, such as that for fusarium ear blight.

== Closure ==
In a pre-budget consultation brief submitted to the Standing Committee on Finance of the House of Commons on 12 August 2011, the University of Manitoba requested the establishment of the Canadian Cereal Research Innovation Laboratory to replace the Cereal Research Centre and other federal grain laboratories that were outdated, in need of replacement, and lacking adequate space, and recommended the closure of the Cereal Research Centre.

During the speech for the 2012 federal budget on 29 March 2012 to the House of Commons, Minister of Finance Jim Flaherty stated that 19,200 federal public service jobs would be eliminated. In April 2012, Agriculture and Agri-Food Canada announced that approximately 100 of those jobs would be cut by closing the Cereal Research Centre. In May 2012, the government announced that wheat genetics, pathology and genomics research work originally based at this facility would be transferred to the research centre in Morden, Manitoba, which had been upgraded as a result of funding in the 2009 federal budget. Other research activities were transferred to a research centre in Brandon, Manitoba. Of the 104 affected employees, 41 had their employment terminated, 57 were transferred to Morden, and 6 were transferred to Brandon.

The research centre was closed in April 2014 upon completion of its final contract. As a result, Agriculture and Agri-Food Canada stated that it would no longer 'finish' variety development.

== See also ==
- Canadian government scientific research organizations
