= Cyril Goulden =

Canadian agricultural scientist (1897-1981)

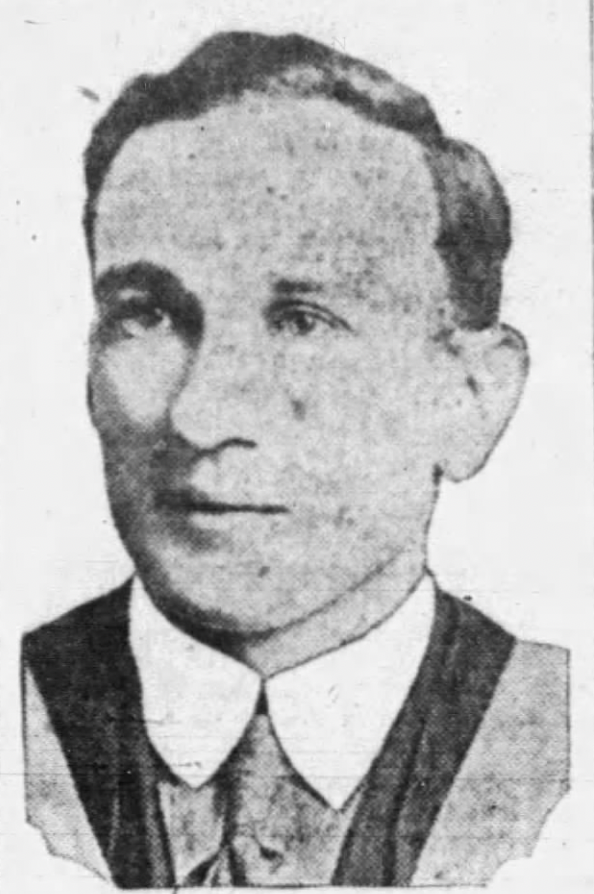
- Image of Goulden in the Saskatoon Daily Star (1921)
- Born: 2 June 1897; Bridgend, Bridgend, Wales
- Died: 4 February 1981 (aged 83); Ottawa, Ontario, Canada
- Occupation: Agronomist
- Spouse: Flora Matheson (m. 1929)
- Children: 2

Academic background
- Education: University of Saskatchewan; University of Minnesota
- Thesis: A Genetic and Cytological Study of Dwarfing in Wheat and Oats (1925)
- Doctoral advisor: H. K. Hayes
- Influences: Ronald Fisher

Academic work
- Discipline: Agronomy
- Sub-discipline: Plant pathology
- Institutions: Dominion Rust Research Laboratory (1925-1948); Department of Agriculture (1948-1962)

Cyril Harold Goulden (2 June 1897, Bridgend – 4 February 1981, Ottawa) was a Canadian agronomist, geneticist, and statistician. He worked to develop cereals that were resistant to disease, specifically stem rust, first for the Dominion Rust Research Laboratory and later for the Department of Agriculture.

== Early life ==
Goulden was born in Bridgend, Wales in 1897 to Thomas and Mary Goulden. He had seven siblings: Wallace, Ida, Raymond, Daisy, Rex, Nora, Eunice, and Kathleen. In 1900, the family moved to Yorkton, Saskatchewan, Canada, along with Thomas' brother William and his family. They were considered early pioneers of the area. Goulden grew up on a farm in Ebenezer, where his parents remained until the mid-1930s, when they moved to Dunleath.

Goulden entered the University of Saskatchewan in 1915 through a Diploma Course, a two-year programme designed for farmers. Before finishing, he switched to the Degree Course, which allowed him to obtain his B.S.A. in 1921. Upon graduation, he received the Scott Scholarship, awarded to the "most distinguished student receiving the B.S.A." for further academic study. He taught agronomy at the university until 1923, when he earned his Master's degree. Goulden did his PhD at University of Minnesota under H. K. Hayes, finishing in 1925 with a thesis titled A Genetic and Cytological Study of Dwarfing in Wheat and Oats.

== Career ==
Upon finishing his PhD in 1925, Goulden was appointed Head of Cereal Breeding at the Dominion Rust Research Laboratory in Winnipeg. He was among the first scientists to work at this institution, which opened in 1925 in response to the devastating stem rust outbreak in 1916. Early in his career, he became familiar with the "Fisherian school of statistics," eventually taking a sabbatical to study statistics under Fisher at the Rothamsted Experimental Station in summer 1930.

When he returned, he began teaching a course on using statistical methods in agriculture at the University of Manitoba. At the same time, his team at Dominion developed rust-resistant oat and wheat varieties. In 1939, he published the textbook Methods of Statistical Analysis, which became a standard reference in North America. In 1945, he and colleague W. J. Mason developed a seed-counting machine that could count 200 to 300 seeds per minute, depending on the type of cereal. Because its parts were commercially, it was affordable enough to be marketed worldwide by the early 1960s.

In 1948, he was appointed to the Department of Agriculture in Ottawa to run the Cereal Crops Division of the Experimental Farm System. He published a revised and expanded second edition of Methods of Statistical Analysis in 1952. Around this time, the wheat variety Selkirk, which originated under his tenure, was the only wheat variety not to be decimated by a new strain of rust. Between 1955 and 1959, he served as Director of the Experimental Farms Service. In 1957, he and colleague K. W. Neatby pitched the idea of a Bureau of Agricultural Research, which would focus on applied research and biometrics. This developed into the Research Branch of the Canada Department of Agriculture, and Goulden served as its first Director General. His position was changed to Assistant Deputy Minister of Research starting in 1958 following Neatby's sudden death. He oversaw the Research Branch, the result of merging the Experimental Farm Service and the Science Service. Goulden retired in April 1962. His leadership at Dominian and the Department of Agriculture resulted in several new cereal varieties, including Regent, Redman, and Selkirk wheat and Vanguard, Ajax, Exeter, and Garry oats.

Over the course of his career, Goulden served as president of the Agricultural Institute of Canada (1955–56) and the International Biometric Society (1958), and was a fellow of the Royal Society of Canada, the American Statistical Association, and the International Biometric Society. He chaired several committees on statistical methods in agronomy and was a member of the International Statistical Institute, the American Society of Agronomy, and the Canadian Forestry Association. As project manager, he also designed and developed exhibits for Expo 67.

== Awards and honours ==
- 1941: Fellow of the Royal Society of Canada
- 1952: Fellow of the American Statistical Association
- 1953: Gold medal, Professional Institute of the Public Service of Canada
- 1954: Honorary LL.D., University of Saskatchewan
- 1956: Life Membership, Yorkton Acgricultural Society
- 1964: Honorary DSc, University of Manitoba
- 1970: Outstanding Achievement Award, University of Minnesota
- 1980: Induction, Canadian Agricultural Hall of Fame
- 1981: Honorary membership (posthumous), Statistical Society of Canada

== Personal life ==
Goulden married violinist Flora Matheson on 15 June 1929 in Winnipeg. The couple had two daughters, Cynthia and Marilyn. He died in Ottawa on 4 February 1981.
