= Ryan Turnbull =

Ryan Turnbull may refer to:

- Ryan Turnbull (footballer) (born 1971), Australian rules footballer
- Ryan Turnbull (politician) (born 1977), Canadian Liberal Party politician
