= 2014 Canadian federal budget =

2014 Budget of the Canadian Federal Government
- Presented: 11 February 2014
- Country: Canada
- Parliament: 41st
- Party: Conservative
- Finance minister: Jim Flaherty
- Total revenue: 276.3 billion (Projected); 282.3 billion (Actual)
- Total expenditures: 279.2 billion (Projected); 282.9 billion (Actual)
- Deficit: 2.9 billion (Projected); 550 million (Actual)
- Website: budget.canada.ca

The Canadian federal budget for fiscal year 2014–15 was presented to the House of Commons of Canada by Jim Flaherty on 11 February 2014. This was the last budget presented by the Finance Minister before his resignation in March and death in April. At the end of the fiscal year, the government was surprised to post a budgetary surplus of $1.9 billion. This however would later be overturned to a small deficit of $550 million due to improper accounting methodologies for the Government's unfunded pension obligations, as pointed out for years by the Auditor General.

== Programs ==
The budget cut CA$3,100,000,000 from the Department of National Defence budget allocated for procurement of equipment via the Canada First Defence Strategy. Flaherty stated the funds would be restored in the future when "key purchases will be made".

The government announced a plan to establish the National Disaster Mitigation Program, which it would begin funding in the 2015–2016 fiscal year under the 2015 budget. The program "will invest in structural mitigation projects" and provide residential flood insurance in conjunction with provincial, territorial, and private insurance plans.

The budget established the Canada First Research Excellence Fund, which was to receive $50 million in the 2015–2016 fiscal year for research funding at post-secondary institutions. Four grant councils, including the Canadian Institutes of Health Research and the Natural Sciences and Engineering Research Council, would receive a combined $46 million annually.

== Taxes and tariffs ==
The proposed budget increased excise taxes on cigars, cigarettes, chewing tobacco, and tobacco sticks, and also imposed a tax increase on duty-free tobacco products. Flaherty stated that the increase was to account for the effects of inflation since 2002, and would be indexed to inflation every five years. the Tax took effect 12 February 2014. The budget allocated $92 million of tobacco tax revenues over five years to establish the Geospatial Intelligence and Automated Dispatch Centre and to install sensors to detect movement of contraband tobacco products in high-risk areas.

The budget included a reduction in sick leave benefits for public servants, a doubling of the Public Service Health Care Plan premium for retired civil servants, and increasing eligibility requirements to reduce enrollment in the program. The government said it also expected to replace the sick leave benefit program with a short-term disability program in future collective bargaining with public sector unions, and included in the budget the expected compensation savings from that change.

The small business hiring tax credit was eliminated by the budget, as was a tariff for mobile offshore drilling systems.

The tax credit for adopting children was increased to CA$15,000. Search and rescue personnel with 200 hours of service per year received a tax credit similar to that received by volunteer fire fighters in the 2011 budget.

"Immigration trusts" were eliminated by the budget. These trusts were used by immigrants to shelter investment income from Canadian income tax. Graduated tax rates for testamentary trusts were also eliminated.

== Business ==
The Automotive Innovation Fund was increased by $500 million over two years. The budget also allocated $78 million per year for five years for the Canadian Food Inspection Agency to improve inspections and establish the Food Safety Information Network.

The budget bill also included a proposal to update some regulations. The Food and Drug Regulations would be amended to redefine the term beer to "reflect innovation" in brewing. It updated the compositional standards, allowing the use of flavouring ingredients such as nutmeg by craft breweries.

Intellectual property laws relating to trademarks, service marks, and patents were changed for consistency with the Madrid Protocol, the Singapore Treaty, the Nice Agreement, the Patent Law Treaty, and the Hague Agreement.

The budget document also stated that Service Canada would operate the Canada Job Grant, which had been announced in the 2013 federal budget, in jurisdictions with which the federal government failed to secure agreements.
