= Celina Caesar-Chavannes =

Canadian politician (born 1974)

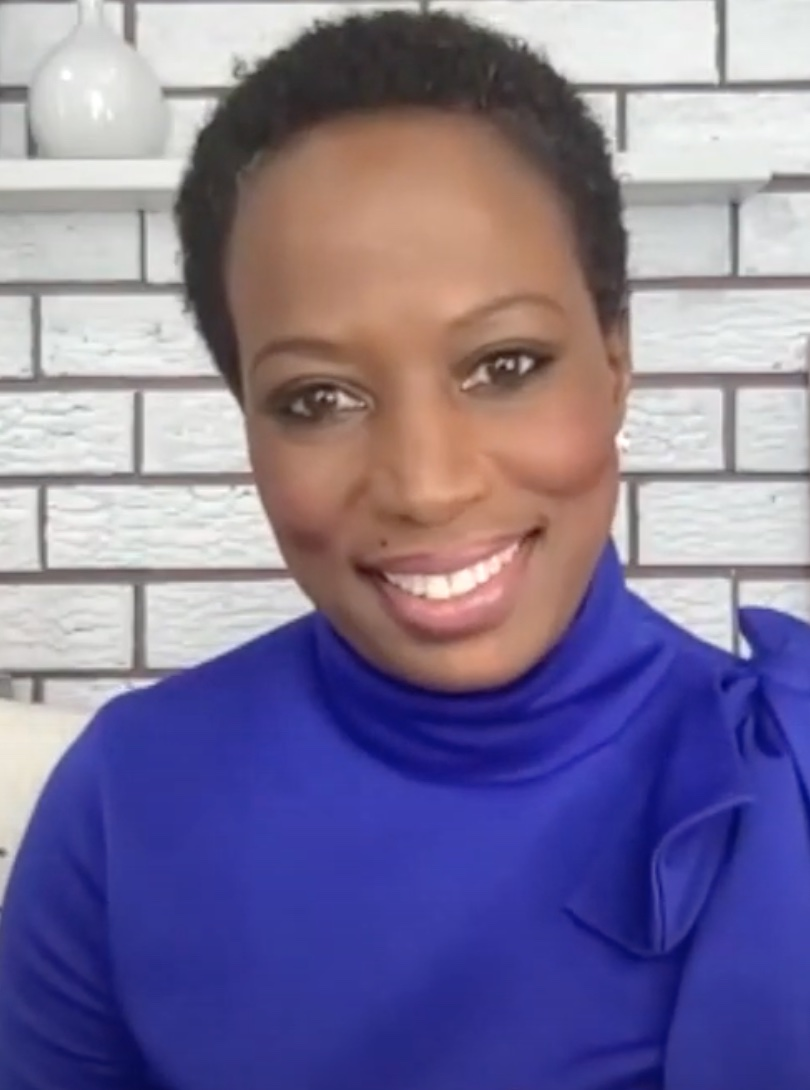
- Caesar-Chavannes in 2021

Member of the Canadian Parliament for Whitby
- In office October 19, 2015 – September 11, 2019
- Preceded by: Pat Perkins
- Succeeded by: Ryan Turnbull

Parliamentary Secretary to the Minister of International Development
- In office January 26, 2017 – August 31, 2018
- Minister: Marie-Claude Bibeau
- Preceded by: Karina Gould
- Succeeded by: Kamal Khera

Parliamentary Secretary to the Prime Minister
- In office December 2, 2015 – January 26, 2017
- Minister: Justin Trudeau
- Preceded by: Paul Calandra
- Succeeded by: Peter Schiefke

Personal details
- Born: June 24, 1974 (age 52) Pomme Rose, St. David's, Grenada
- Party: Independent
- Other political affiliations: Liberal (2015–2019)
- Spouse: Vidal Chavannes
- Education: New College, Toronto (BSc); University of Phoenix (MBA)
- Profession: Entrepreneur, Author

Celina R. Caesar-Chavannes (born June 24, 1974) is a Canadian politician who served as the Member of Parliament (MP) for the riding of Whitby in the House of Commons of Canada from 2015 to 2019. Elected as a Liberal in the 2015 federal election, she later sat as an independent member. Caesar-Chavannes also unsuccessfully ran in the 2023 Toronto mayoral by-election, placing thirty-ninth out of 102 candidates.

As a member of the Liberal caucus, she was appointed Parliamentary Secretary to the Prime Minister in December 2015 and served in that role until January 26, 2017, when she became Parliamentary Secretary to the Minister of International Development. On August 31, 2018, Caesar-Chavannes returned to the backbenches after the Prime Minister decided to shuffle his parliamentary secretaries. On March 2, 2019, Caesar-Chavannes announced that she would not be seeking re-election in 2019 and almost three weeks later, on March 20, the Prime Minister's Office announced that she had decided to resign from the Liberal caucus.

== Education and designations ==
She graduated from New College at the University of Toronto, earning a Bachelor of Science degree in biology, followed by an online MBA in healthcare management from the University of Phoenix, and an executive MBA. She subsequently served on the University of Toronto's governing council, including time as vice chair of the council for the University of Toronto Scarborough.

Caesar-Chavannes worked as an international research consultant, as well as a lecturer on the need to include marginalized populations in clinical research. She was named Business Entrepreneur of the Year in 2012 by the Toronto Region Board of Trade.

== Elections ==
She was the Liberal candidate for the riding of Whitby—Oshawa in the 2014 by-election resulting from the sudden death of former Conservative Finance Minister Jim Flaherty. She finished second to Conservative candidate Pat Perkins.

In the general election held the following year, Caesar-Chavannes was again the Liberal nominee in the newly created Whitby riding, this time defeating Perkins in a rematch.

== Member of Parliament ==
=== Advocacy for gender and racial equity ===
Caesar-Chavannes has repeatedly spoken out her experiences of anti-black racist micro-aggressions on Parliament Hill that has characterized her time as a Member of Parliament, including being denied entry into her office building by security. She has been criticized by Maxime Bernier for focusing on the colour of her skin as opposed to the issues facing her constituents.

=== Intention not to seek re-election ===
On February 12, 2019, Caesar-Chavannes informed Prime Minister Justin Trudeau that she had chosen not to seek re-election in the upcoming federal election. Because Jody Wilson-Raybould had resigned from the Cabinet that day in the wake of the SNC-Lavalin Affair, Trudeau told her that she should wait before making her announcement. Caesar-Chavannes publicly announced her intention not to seek re-election on March 2, 2019, citing reasons that had arisen prior to Jody Wilson-Raybould's resignation. Caesar-Chavannes later claimed that her conversation with Trudeau about her resignation led to anger and hostility by Trudeau, and she publicly criticized Trudeau's leadership style for the interaction.

=== Resignation from the Liberal caucus ===
On March 20, 2019, Caesar-Chavannes informed the Prime Minister that she would be resigning as a member of the Liberal caucus and would be moving forward as an independent Member of Parliament. She cited conflict with the Prime Minister for the decision to sit as an independent. Caesar-Chavannes cited allegations of racism, microaggressions and tokenization during her interactions with the Prime Minister before her resignation. Her request occurred around the same time as the resignation of Liberal MP Jody Wilson-Raybould and she said she was met with hostility. According to Caesar-Chavannes, Trudeau allegedly said that “he couldn’t have two powerful women of colour leave at the same time.”

== Post-parliamentary activities ==
In 2021 Caesar-Chavannes published Can You Hear Me Now?, a memoir and leadership book detailing her upbringing, journey as a young Black woman entrepreneur, former politician and the adversity that she overcame. Can You Hear Me Now? is a book about the journey of healing, finding your authentic voice and demonstrating that "effective and humane leaders grow as much from their mistakes and vulnerabilities as from their strengths." The book was nominated for the 2021 Shaughnessy Cohen Prize for Political Writing.

Caesar-Chavannes is a contributor to the Canadaland podcast The Backbench.

In the 2019 federal election Liberal nominee Ryan Turnbull won election in Whitby, succeeding Caesar-Chavannes to the seat. In the 2021 federal election, Caesar-Chavannes endorsed Maleeha Shahid, the Conservative Party of Canada nominee in Whitby. Shahid placed second to Turnbull in that contest.

On April 4, 2023, Caesar-Chavannes officially registered to run for mayor of Toronto, an office that has been vacant following the resignation of former mayor John Tory. Caesar-Chavannes received 253 votes in the by-election.

== Electoral record ==
2015 Canadian federal election
Party	Candidate	Votes	%	±%	Expenditures
Liberal	Celina Caesar-Chavannes	29,003	44.95	+30.46	$53,971.84
Conservative	Pat Perkins	27,154	42.09	−16.72	$62,752.73
New Democratic	Ryan Kelly	6,677	10.35	−11.06	$11,930.35
Green	Craig Cameron	1,403	2.17	−2.81	$1,685.15
Independent	Jon O'Connor	279	0.43	–	$1,811.93
Total valid votes/Expense limit		64,516	100.0		$233,804.45
Total rejected ballots		235	–	–	
Turnout		64,751	–	–	
Eligible voters		90,964			
Source: Elections Canada

Canadian federal by-election, November 17, 2014: Whitby—Oshawa Death of Jim Flaherty
Party	Candidate	Votes	%	±%	Expenditures
Conservative	Pat Perkins	17,082	49.31	−9.11	–
Liberal	Celina Caesar-Chavannes	14,083	40.65	+26.54	–
New Democratic	Trish McAuliffe	2,801	8.08	−14.19	–
Green	Craig Cameron	500	1.44	−3.45	–
Independent	John "The Engineer" Turmel	101	0.29		–
Independent	Josh Borenstein	77	0.22		–
Total valid votes/expense limit			100.0		
Total rejected ballots					
Turnout		34,644	31.79	−31.45	
Eligible voters		108,969		+6.87	
Conservative hold		Swing		−17.89	
Source: "By-election Results". Elections Canada. November 20, 2014.
