= Federal stimulus =

Federal stimulus may refer to:

- Economic Stimulus Act of 2008
- American Recovery and Reinvestment Act of 2009
- 2009 Canadian federal budget
