= Canada Job Grant =

Canadian skill and trade training program

The Canada Job Grant is a skill and trade training program established by the Government of Canada subsequent to the passage of the 2013 federal budget. It will be funded by the Canada Job Fund, a fund transfer from the federal government to provincial and territorial governments, which will be responsible for implementing the program. It will enable individuals to receive up to CA$15,000 in training services, funded by the federal government and the individual's employer.

== Establishment ==
Passage of the 2013 federal budget resulted in the establishment of the Canada Job Grant in 2014, a training fund stipulating that the federal government would provide CA$5,000 for an individual's training in trades and skills, but requiring matching funds from provincial governments and the individual's employer. The program is part of the federal government's strategy to develop skills for jobs that were not being filled, or were being filled by temporary foreign workers.

The federal government expected to fund the annual CA$300 million program by renegotiating the Labour Market Agreement it had with the provinces, which expired in 2014. The Labour Market Agreements were federal transfers of $500 million to the provinces used to assist vulnerable workers.

=== Objections ===
The fund's announcement during the 2013 federal budget speech was criticized by provincial representatives. Brad Duguid, Ontario's Minister of Training, Colleges, and Universities, stated that the program would shift CA$194 million from programs "that target our most vulnerable and have the greatest barriers to entering the workforce".

Quebec's Minister of Finance, Nicolas Marceau, stated that the federal government was "undoing and sabotaging what Quebec has long been doing". On 22 March 2013, Labour Minister Agnes Maltais of the Government of Quebec formally requested exclusion from the program. It prefers to operate its own program, instead of participating in a joint federal-provincial program.

Objections were also raised by First Nations about a five-year CA$241 million skills training program available only to reserves that make it "mandatory for those receiving income assistance payments to be retrained".

Provincial government officials also stated that it removed full control of spending of the funds by the provinces. Marceau described it as "economic sabotage". At the July 2013 Council of the Federation at Niagara-on-the-Lake, premiers unanimously opposed the Canada Job Grant. Kathleen Wynne, the Premier of Ontario, stated that the proposed fund was "not going to work the way it is".

Brad Wall, the Premier of Saskatchewan, stated that businesses in Saskatchewan may not benefit from the program because the province was at full employment and that the province needed basic skills training programs for vulnerable individuals.

Provincial governments did not want federal funding for the program to be taken from the labour market agreements it had with each province since 2007. The CA$300 million program, representing a reallocation of 60% of federal labour market agreement contributions to the provinces, would necessitate the provinces funding programs operated via the labour market agreement by other means. These programs, which are considered successful, ensured continued employment for 86% of participants two years after training.

The 2014 federal budget specified that Service Canada would operate the Canada Job Grant in jurisdictions with which the federal government failed to secure agreements. Wes Sheridan, the Minister of Finance, Energy and Municipal Affairs for Prince Edward Island, described it as a "take it or leave it Canada Job Grant program". Marceau stated that this was a "thinly veiled threat to Quebec and the other provinces".

=== Negotiations ===
Jason Kenney, the Minister of Employment and Social Development, negotiated terms of the funding program with provincial and territorial ministers in February 2014. The deal required provinces to allocate 10% of the Labour Market Agreement to the training fund, and required an additional 10% of funding each subsequent year from any source of federal government transfers to the provinces (for example, the Labour Market Agreement or Labour Market Development Agreement).

The deal also removed the requirement that the provincial and territorial governments provide matching funds. Instead, the federal government assumed two-thirds of the cost to train each individual, with the other portion funded by the individual's employer. An exception for small businesses was also introduced, reducing their required contribution to 15% of the cost (from 33%). The federal government also agreed to perform a review by December 2015 to evaluate the effectiveness of the training program.

With the deal in place, the federal government negotiated implementation deals with each provincial representative.

== Adoption ==
The program is expected to fund training for 130,000 individuals annually when it is fully operational. Training must be provided by an eligible third-party training operator for employees of private and not-for-profit companies. About one-third of the funding for each employee trained will be provided by the employer, and the remainder by the federal government. The program is for short duration training of at least 25 hours completed within one year. It may be provided in a classroom, online, or on-site, and will pay for tuition, examination fees, texts, and other training material. Applications must be submitted by employers on behalf of individuals being sponsored, or by self-employed individuals, and the trainee must be a Canadian citizen, permanent resident, or subject to the Protected Persons Entitled to Work in Canada.

Six provincial governments signed agreements for funding training via the Canada Job Grant. These were the Government of Alberta, Government of British Columbia, Government of Manitoba, Government of New Brunswick, Government of Ontario, and the Government of Quebec. These will be funded by Canada Job Fund agreements, which will replace the Labour Market Agreement the federal government had with each province.

=== Alberta ===
Alberta Works administers the program in Alberta.

=== British Columbia ===
On 24 October 2014, the government of British Columbia and the federal government announced the Canada-British Columbia Job Fund Agreement to replace the Labour Market Agreement previously in place between the two governments. The CA$65 million annual fund includes CA$38 million for the Canada Job Grant.

The provincial government began accepting applications from employers the same day. It is expected to provide training for 900 individuals in its first year of operation, about 3,500 individuals annually once fully implemented in 2017, and 16,000 individuals overall.

=== Manitoba ===
Manitoba was the first province to implement the program, and began accepting applications in July 2014.

=== New Brunswick ===
The government of New Brunswick signed an agreement in principle with the federal government in March 2014, by which the program would provide for CA$11 million annually for six years in funding for training.

=== Newfoundland and Labrador ===
Newfoundland and Labrador began accepting applications in August 2014.

=== Ontario ===
The Government of Ontario signed the Canada-Ontario Job Fund Agreement with the federal government on 28 March 2014, providing two pilot programs operated by the Ministry of Training, Colleges and Universities. A customized training program for training specific to a company lacking the capacity to develop a training program, and a skills improvement program named UpSkill for sector-specific essential and technical skills training targeting occupations with lower-skill workers.

Ontario will receive CA$115 million in transfers for the Canada Job Grant once the program is fully implemented, part of CA$192 million in transfers for the Canada-Ontario Job Fund Agreement that replaced the Labour Market Agreement between the federal government and the government of Ontario.

Details of the program were finalized on 26 September 2014, at which time the government of Ontario began accepting applications from employers.

=== Prince Edward Island ===
Prince Edward Island began accepting applications in August 2014.
