= 2013 Canadian federal budget =

2013 Budget of the Canadian Federal Government
- Presented: 21 March 2013
- Country: Canada
- Parliament: 41st
- Party: Conservative
- Finance minister: Jim Flaherty
- Total revenue: 263.9 billion (Projected); 271.7 billion (Actual)
- Total expenditures: 282.6 billion (Projected); 279.7 billion (Actual)
- Deficit: 18.9 billion (Projected); 8.1 billion (Actual)
- Website: http://www.budget.gc.ca/2013/doc/plan/toc-tdm-eng.html

The Canadian federal budget for fiscal year 2013–14 was presented to the House of Commons of Canada by Finance Minister Jim Flaherty on 21 March 2013. The budget bill was tabled in the legislature on 29 April 2013 as the Economic Action Plan 2013 Act, No. 1. A second budget bill will be tabled in the autumn, which will include elements excluded from the first bill, such as the Canada Job Grant. The deficit was projected to be $18.7 billion for the fiscal year 2013-2014, however this was adjusted to $8.1 billion by end of the fiscal year and once the Auditor General's recommendations on the Government's unfunded pension obligations were taken into account.

== Taxation ==
There were no new tax measures or tax reductions in the proposed budget bill, but some tax loopholes were eliminated, which is expected to generate an additional $880 million in tax revenues annually.

=== Tariffs ===
As a result of the 2013 budget, import tariffs for 37 goods were eliminated—specifically sporting goods (excluding bicycles) and baby clothing made of "cotton, synthetic fibres, textile materials, wool or fine animal hair". Such cuts were expected to result in decreased tax revenues of $76 million for the Government of Canada.

Tariffs on other goods in 1290 product classes were increased owing to a change in status classification of 72 trading nations from "developing" status to "fully developed". Imports from nations including Brazil, China, India, Indonesia, and Russia were affected by reclassification, as they were no longer subject to the general preferential tariff (GPT). The average increase was 3%, and would result in $333 million annually in additional tax revenues for the Canadian government. The tariffs took effect 1 January 2015. Doug Porter, the chief economist of the Bank of Montreal, expressed concern about adverse effects, commenting that such increases would widen the disparity in prices of goods in Canada compared to the same goods in the United States, which may aggravate cross-border shopping. The budget also provided that rules of origin would be amended "to ensure imported textiles and apparel from poorer nations" would not be affected if their manufacture requires materials from promoted nations.

Some goods affected by these tariff increases included solid-state drives and USB devices (from no tariff to 6%), most of which are imported from China, South Korea, Thailand and Malaysia, four of the nations losing GPT status.

=== Tax evasion ===
The budget proposal included a reward system for individuals who report Canadians with an offshore account, and eliminated the tax deduction for leasing a safe deposit box. The Stop International Tax Evasion Program enabled the Canada Revenue Agency to reward informants up to 15% of taxes collected if it exceeds $100,000. Critics complained that a planned $60 million cut of the CRA budget and its limited resources imply the CRA would not be able to investigate or pursue tax evaders. Another criticism was that the reward may be too small, or that most rewards may be accrued by non-Canadians working in offshore institutions. Walid Hejazi of the Rotman School of Management said that the program is unlikely to generate much revenue, but may act as a deterrent for some potential tax evaders.

=== Personal taxes ===
There was an increase in the lifetime capital gains exemption to $800,000, which was indexed to inflation, a reduction of the dividend tax credit, and elimination of the use of financial strategies such as loss trading and synthetic disposition. The budget introduced measures requiring financial institutions to report any electronic fund transfer exceeding $10,000.

=== Corporate taxes ===
The capital cost allowance (CCA) for manufacturing and processing equipment was extended to the end of 2015. The budget also allocated $60 million over five years for use by incubator and accelerator investment organizations, and $70 million over three years to create 5,000 internship positions for recent post-secondary graduates.

== Expenditures ==
The Federal Economic Development Agency for Southern Ontario had its funding renewed for another five years, averaging about $184 million annually.

=== Borders ===
The budget proposal approved projects related to information-sharing and infrastructure for the "Beyond the Border" perimeter security program undertaken with the United States. This included upgrading border posts at Saint-Bernard-de-Lacolle (Quebec), Landsdowne (Ontario), Emerson (Manitoba), and North Portal (Saskatchewan), implementation of a cargo security program for port facilities in Vancouver and Montreal, and $19 million toward the Detroit River International Crossing.

Privacy advocates and civil liberties groups criticized the data sharing arrangement, in which Canada and the United States share with each other information about land entry and exit of individuals, to be used for immigration, refugee, and visa programs.

In order to cover the costs associated with processing visa claims and immigration applications, the budget proposal allocated an additional $42 million for visa and $44 million for citizenship programs. This was expected to reduce the backlog of almost 320,000 unprocessed citizenship applications. The costs for submitting an application were also increased.

=== Infrastructure spending ===
The proposal allocated about $2 billion annually from gasoline tax revenues to municipalities for infrastructure development and maintenance, including public transit, under the Community Improvement Fund starting in 2014–2015. It replaced the similar fund introduced in the 2005 budget by the 38th Canadian Parliament, and increased by 2% annually. Infrastructure projects that may use such funding include highways, short-line rail, regional and local airports, short-sea shipping, broadband internet connectivity, redevelopment of brownfields, disaster mitigation, and those involving culture, tourism, or sport and recreation. Municipalities will receive funding for projects on a per capita basis.

It also allocated $248 million for weather monitoring infrastructure.

The Building Canada Fund managed by Infrastructure Canada was renewed for ten years, receiving $210 million in 2014-2015, and increasing annually to $2.1 billion in 2021-2022. About $4 billion over ten years was allocated for projects of national significance, including development and expansion of public transit and roads, and $155 million to be used for First Nations infrastructure programs. The fund was also extended for use by educational institutions and airports. The Goods and Services Tax rebate for municipalities was also extended for 10 years, by which municipalities will be able to collectively claim about $1 billion annually via the GST Rebate for Municipalities.

=== Environment ===
In a press release on 21 March 2013, the Nature Conservancy of Canada supported the $20 million, one-year extension of the Natural Areas Conservation Program, a national public-private partnership by which ecologically sensitive lands are acquired and conserved.

Sustainable Development Technology Canada, a government-funded venture capital firm, was allocated to receive $325 million over eight years.

=== Culture ===
Government event promotion and execution, such as activities related to Canada Day and Winterlude, were transferred from the National Capital Commission to the Department of Canadian Heritage, which also resulted in the transfer of up to 80 employees.

The budget allocated $8 million to renovate Massey Hall in Toronto.

=== Canada Job Grant ===
The budget established the Canada Job Grant, which provides $5,000 for an individual's training in trades and skills, requiring matching funds from provincial governments and the individual's employer.

The Canada Job Grant is a training fund, that was established in 2014 via the budget, which will enable individuals to receive up to $15,000 in training services, funded equally by the federal government, a provincial government, and the individual's employer. The federal government expects to fund the $300 million program by renegotiating the Labour Market Agreement it has with each of the provinces, which expired in 2014. The program will train 130,000 individuals annually when it is fully operational.

Brad Duguid, Ontario's minister of training, colleges, and universities, stated that the program will shift $194 million from programs "that target our most vulnerable and have the greatest barriers to entering the workforce".

Quebec's Minister of Finance, Nicolas Marceau, stated that the federal government was "undoing and sabotaging what Quebec has long been doing". On 22 March 2013, Labour Minister Agnes Maltais of the Government of Quebec formally requested exclusion from the program. It prefers to operate its own program, instead of participating in a joint federal-provincial program.

Objections were also raised by First Nations about a five-year $241 million skills training program available only to reserves which make it "mandatory for those receiving income assistance payments to be retrained".

Provincial government officials also stated that it removed full control of spending of the funds by the provinces. Marceau described it as "economic sabotage". At the July 2013 Council of the Federation at Niagara-on-the-Lake, premiers unanimously opposed the Canada Job Grant, and Ontario premier Kathleen Wynne stated "It's not going to work the way it is".

== Other impacts of the federal budget ==
Approximately 12,000 government services employees were laid-off, and 7,000 jobs were eliminated via attrition. the budget enabled a government official to sit at any collective bargaining negotiation between a Crown corporation and its employees, and the government must approve the terms of such negotiations.

The budget bill also called for administrative changes to government operations. It merged the Canadian International Development Agency into the Department of Foreign Affairs and International Trade.

The budget discontinued funding for mixed police squads, that is police squads composed of members from police services of more than one municipality. This funding had been used in Quebec to fund regional police services "to help fight organized crime".

The opposition parties have complained that the budget bill is an omnibus bill, like the 2012 budget, containing non-budgetary items.

The government invested $23 million over two years to attract foreign students.

== Reactions ==
The budget was poorly received by the general public. A pan-canadian poll carried out by Leger Marketing showed that 52 % of Canadians were dissatisfied with the federal budget (of which 23 % were not satisfied at all) and only 29 % were satisfied. Satisfaction was highest in Alberta (51 %) and the lowest in Quebec (15 %) and the Atlantic provinces (16 %).

=== Provinces ===
Nicolas Marceau, Quebec's Finance Minister, severely criticized the federal budget as a frontal attack on Quebec and an economic sabotage undertaking.

Raymond Bachand, Liberal MNA and predecessor of Nicolas Marceau as Quebec's Finance Minister, regretted that the budget plans the phase-out of the Labour-sponsored funds tax credit between 2015 and 2017.

== See also ==
- List of tariffs in Canada
- 2013 Ontario provincial budget
