= Durham Centre (provincial electoral district) =

Former provincial electoral district in Ontario, Canada

Ontario electoral district

Defunct provincial electoral district
- Legislature: Legislative Assembly of Ontario
- District created: 1987
- First contested: 1987
- Last contested: 1995

Durham Centre was a provincial electoral district in the Durham Region of Ontario, Canada. Created in 1987, the riding contained the town of Whitby from south of Taunton Road. It was abolished in 1999 and redistributed into Whitby—Ajax.

== Member history ==
This riding has elected the following members of the Legislative Assembly of Ontario:

Durham Centre
Assembly	Years	Member	Party
Riding created from Durham East and Durham West
34th	1987–1990	Allan Furlong	Liberal
35th	1990–1995	Drummond White	New Democratic
36th	1995–1999	Jim Flaherty	Progressive Conservative
Riding dissolved into Whitby—Ajax

== Election results ==
1995 Ontario general election
Party	Candidate	Votes	%	±%
Progressive Conservative	Jim Flaherty	25,107	58.34	+32.34
Liberal	Allan Furlong	9,808	22.79	–6.40
New Democratic	Drummond White	8,120	18.87	–17.02
Total valid votes		43,035	99.06	
Total rejected, unmarked and declined ballots		408	0.94	–0.46
Turnout		43,443	65.02	+3.79
Eligible voters		66,816		
Progressive Conservative gain from New Democratic		Swing		+24.68
Source: Elections Ontario

1990 Ontario general election
Party	Candidate	Votes	%	±%
New Democratic	Drummond White	12,594	35.88	+4.94
Liberal	Allan Furlong	10,246	29.19	–11.15
Progressive Conservative	Jim Flaherty	9,126	26.00	–1.52
Family Coalition	Nino Maltese	1,186	3.38	–
Confederation of Regions	Philip Wyatt	1,087	3.10	–
Green	David A. J. Hubbell	857	2.44	+1.26
Total valid votes		35,096	98.60	
Total rejected, unmarked and declined ballots		497	1.40	+0.72
Turnout		35,593	61.23	–0.13
Eligible voters		58,134		
New Democratic gain from Liberal		Swing		+8.05
Source: Elections Ontario

1987 Ontario general election
Party	Candidate	Votes	%
Liberal	Allan Furlong	12,885	40.35
New Democratic	Sarah Kelly	9,881	30.94
Progressive Conservative	Stephanie Ball	8,790	27.53
Green	Harold Tausch	378	1.18
Total valid votes		31,934	99.33
Total rejected ballots		217	0.67
Turnout		32,151	61.35
Eligible voters		52,404	
Liberal pickup new district.			
Source: Elections Ontario

== See also ==
- List of Ontario provincial electoral districts
- Canadian provincial electoral districts
