= Whitby—Ajax =

Ontario federal and provincial electoral district

Ontario electoral district

Defunct federal electoral district
- Legislature: House of Commons
- District created: 1996
- District abolished: 2003
- First contested: 1997
- Last contested: 2000

Demographics
- Population (2001): 128,164
- Electors (2002): 83,443
- Area (km²): 188
- Census subdivision(s): Whitby, Ajax

Whitby—Ajax was a federal and provincial electoral district in Ontario, Canada. It was represented in the House of Commons of Canada from 1997 to 2003, and in the Legislative Assembly of Ontario from 1999 to 2007. It was located to the east of Toronto, consisting of the Town of Whitby and the part of the Town of Ajax lying to the south of Kingston Road.

The federal riding was created in 1996, from parts of Durham and Ontario ridings, while the provincial riding was created in 1999 from Durham Centre, Durham East and Durham West.

The federal electoral district was abolished in 2003 when it was redistributed between Ajax—Pickering and Whitby—Oshawa ridings. The provincial electoral district was abolished in 2007, when it was also redistributed into Ajax—Pickering and Whitby—Oshawa.

== Members of Parliament ==
=== Federal ===
Parliament	Years	Member	Party
Riding created from Durham and Ontario
36th	1997–2000	Judi Longfield	Liberal
37th	2000–2004	Judi Longfield	Liberal
Riding dissolved into Ajax—Pickering and Whitby—Oshawa

=== Provincial ===
Whitby—Ajax
Assembly	Years	Member	Party
Riding created from Durham Centre, Durham East and Durham West
37th	1999–2003	Jim Flaherty	Progressive Conservative
38th	2003–2006	Jim Flaherty	Progressive Conservative
38th	2006–2007	Christine Elliott	Progressive Conservative
Riding dissolved into Ajax—Pickering and Whitby—Oshawa

== Electoral history ==
=== Federal elections ===
2000 Canadian federal election
Party	Candidate	Votes	%	Expenditures
Liberal	Judi Longfield	25,693	52.68	$68,465.75
Alliance	Shaun Gillespie	13,159	26.98	$28,304.89
Progressive Conservative	Rob Chopowick	7,563	15.51	$12,247.43
New Democratic	Vic Perroni	2,359	4.84	$2,493.06
Total valid votes		48,774	100.00	
Total rejected ballots		153		
Turnout		48,927	58.64	
Electors on the lists		83,443		
Sources: Official Results, Elections Canada and Financial Returns, Elections Canada.

1997 Canadian federal election
Party	Candidate	Votes	%	Expenditures
Liberal	Judi Longfield	23,551	47.69	$43,611
Reform	Bill Serjeantson	11,977	24.25	$157
Progressive Conservative	Frank Snyder	10,107	20.47	$44,118
New Democratic	Karen Dolan	3,354	6.79	$30,424
Canadian Action	Robert Charles Radford	394	0.80	$1,904
Total valid votes		49,383	100.00	
Total rejected ballots		248		
Turnout		49,631	66.83	
Electors on the lists		74,268		
Sources: Official Results, Elections Canada and Financial Returns, Elections Canada.

=== Provincial elections ===
Ontario provincial by-election, March 30, 2006 Resignation of Jim Flaherty
Party	Candidate	Votes	%	±%
Progressive Conservative	Christine Elliott	15,843	46.23	−2.2
Liberal	Judi Longfield	14,529	42.40	+2.2
New Democratic	Julie Gladman	3,204	9.35	+0.2
Green	Nick Boileau	307	0.90	−1.5
Freedom	Paul McKeever	197	0.57	–
Family Coalition	Victor Carvalho	102	0.30	–
Libertarian	Marty Gobin	87	0.25	–
Total valid votes		34,269	100.00	
Total rejected, unmarked and declined ballots		107	0.31	
Turnout		34,376	32.42	
Eligible voters		106,028		
Progressive Conservative hold		Swing		
Source(s) "SUMMARY OF VALID BALLOTS CAST FOR EACH CANDIDATE - Whitby—Ajax" (PDF). Elections Ontario. 2006.

2003 Ontario general election
Party	Candidate	Votes	%	±%
Progressive Conservative	Jim Flaherty	27,240	48.3	-9.6
Liberal	Dennis Fox	22,593	40.1	+6.1
New Democratic	Dan Edwards	5,155	9.1	+1.0
Green	Michael MacDonald	1,375	2.4	-

1999 Ontario general election
Party	Candidate	Votes	%	±%
Progressive Conservative	Jim Flaherty	27,623	57.9	-
Liberal	Aldo Digiovanni	16,235	34.0	-
New Democratic	Betty Craig	3,889	8.1	-

== See also ==
- List of Ontario provincial electoral districts
- List of Canadian electoral districts
- Historical federal electoral districts of Canada
