= Judi Longfield =

Canadian politician

The Honourable Judi Longfield PC

Member of Parliament for Whitby—Ajax (1997-2004); Whitby—Oshawa (2004-2006)
- In office 1997–2006
- Preceded by: New riding
- Succeeded by: Jim Flaherty

Personal details
- Born: April 23, 1947 (age 78) Timmins, Ontario
- Party: Liberal
- Spouse: Alan Longfield
- Profession: Executive assistant, teacher

Judi Longfield, PC (Note: Parliamentary Secretaries who served under Prime Minister Paul Martin were made Privy Council members.) (born April 23, 1947) is a former Canadian politician. She was a member of the House of Commons of Canada from 1997 to 2006, representing the riding of Whitby—Oshawa as a member of the Liberal Party. She has also campaigned for the Legislative Assembly of Ontario.

== Background ==
Longfield was born in Timmins, Ontario. She graduated from North Bay Teacher's College, and worked as a community college teacher before taking time off to raise a family. She was a governor of the Trafalgar Castle School for Girls. Longfield began working for the Liberal Party in 1965 as an organizer, and was an executive assistant to Ontario Liberal Members of Provincial Parliament (MPPs) Allan Furlong and Steve Mahoney. She was a field organizer in Jean Chrétien's 1990 leadership campaign, and co-managed Dalton McGuinty's bid to become provincial leader in 1996.

== Politics ==
Longfield was elected to the Whitby municipal council in 1991, winning a close victory in the city's second ward. She was re-elected in 1994. Longfield was involved with the local government division of the National Democratic Institute in this period, and represented Canada on delegations to Romania and Guyana.

Longfield was designated as the Liberal candidate for Whitby—Ajax in the 1997 federal election, as part of an effort by Prime Minister Chrétien to increase the number of female Members of Parliament (MPs) in the Liberal caucus. She won a convincing victory, and was returned in the 2000 and 2004 elections, fending off a strong challenge from the Conservative Party on the latter occasion.

Longfield served as parliamentary secretary to the Minister of Labour from 1999 to 2001 under Chrétien, and was parliamentary secretary to the Minister of Labour and Housing in Paul Martin's government from 2004 to 2006. She also remained active with the Ontario Liberal Party, co-chairing that party's campaign in the 1999 provincial election. Initially associated with the Chrétien wing of the Liberal Party, Longfield sided with supporters of Chrétien's rival Paul Martin during a key procedural vote in 2002.

Longfield was a supporter of pay equity policies, and criticized her own government for appealing a Supreme Court decision on the issue in 1998. She was also a vocal proponent of affordable housing.

Longfield was defeated in the 2006 federal election by Conservative candidate Jim Flaherty, a former cabinet minister from the provincial government of Mike Harris. Shortly thereafter, she was chosen as the Ontario Liberal Party candidate for Flaherty's vacated provincial seat in a provincial by-election held on March 30, 2006. She finished a close second against Progressive Conservative candidate Christine Elliott, Flaherty's wife.

== Electoral record ==
Ontario provincial by-election, March 30, 2006: Whitby—Ajax Resignation of Jim Flaherty
Party	Candidate	Votes	%	±%
Progressive Conservative	Christine Elliott	15,843	46.23	−2.2
Liberal	Judi Longfield	14,529	42.40	+2.2
New Democratic	Julie Gladman	3,204	9.35	+0.2
Green	Nick Boileau	307	0.90	−1.5
Freedom	Paul McKeever	197	0.57	–
Family Coalition	Victor Carvalho	102	0.30	–
Libertarian	Marty Gobin	87	0.25	–
Total valid votes		34,269	100.00	
Total rejected, unmarked and declined ballots		107	0.31	
Turnout		34,376	32.42	
Eligible voters		106,028		
Progressive Conservative hold		Swing		
Source(s) "SUMMARY OF VALID BALLOTS CAST FOR EACH CANDIDATE - Whitby—Ajax" (PDF). Elections Ontario. 2006.

2006 Canadian federal election: Whitby—Oshawa
Party	Candidate	Votes	%	±%	Expenditures
Conservative	Jim Flaherty	29,294	43.86	+7.80	$ 88,591.06
Liberal	Judi Longfield	25,882	38.75	−6.29	78,783.33
New Democratic	Maret Sadem-Thompson	8,716	13.05	−1.00	9,898.30
Green	Ajay Krishnan	2,407	3.60	−1.25	238.56
Libertarian	Marty Gobin	274	0.41		258.75
Canadian Action	Tom Cochrane	217	0.32		120.18
Total valid votes/expense limit		66,790	100.0	+17.30	$ 88,730.91
Total rejected ballots		237	0.35	−0.14	
Turnout		67,027	70.60	+6.52	
Electors on the lists		94,938		+6.32	
Sources: Official Results, Elections Canada and Financial Returns, Elections Canada

2004 Canadian federal election: Whitby—Oshawa
Party	Candidate	Votes	%	Expenditures
Liberal	Judi Longfield	25,649	45.04	$80,842
Conservative	Ian MacNeil	20,531	36.06	$30,004
New Democratic	Maret Sadem-Thompson	8,002	14.05	$13,477
Green	Michael MacDonald	2,759	4.85	$0
Total valid votes		56,941	100.00	
Total rejected ballots		283	0.49	
Turnout		57,224	64.08	
Electors on the lists		89,296		
Percentage change figures are factored for redistribution. Conservative Party percentages are contrasted with the combined Canadian Alliance and Progressive Conservative percentages from 2000.
Sources: Official Results, Elections Canada and Financial Returns, Elections Canada.

2000 Canadian federal election: Whitby—Ajax
Party	Candidate	Votes	%	Expenditures
Liberal	Judi Longfield	25,693	52.68	$68,465.75
Alliance	Shaun Gillespie	13,159	26.98	$28,304.89
Progressive Conservative	Rob Chopowick	7,563	15.51	$12,247.43
New Democratic	Vic Perroni	2,359	4.84	$2,493.06
Total valid votes		48,774	100.00	
Total rejected ballots		153		
Turnout		48,927	58.64	
Electors on the lists		83,443		
Sources: Official Results, Elections Canada and Financial Returns, Elections Canada.

1997 Canadian federal election: Whitby—Ajax
Party	Candidate	Votes	%	Expenditures
Liberal	Judi Longfield	23,551	47.69	$43,611
Reform	Bill Serjeantson	11,977	24.25	$157
Progressive Conservative	Frank Snyder	10,107	20.47	$44,118
New Democratic	Karen Dolan	3,354	6.79	$30,424
Canadian Action	Robert Charles Radford	394	0.80	$1,904
Total valid votes		49,383	100.00	
Total rejected ballots		248		
Turnout		49,631	66.83	
Electors on the lists		74,268		
Sources: Official Results, Elections Canada and Financial Returns, Elections Canada.

1994 Whitby municipal election: Council, Ward Two
Candidate	Result
Judi Longfield	acclaimed

1991 Whitby municipal election: Council, Ward Two
Candidate	Result
Judi Longfield	elected
David Wall	-

All federal electoral information is taken from Elections Canada. Italicized expenditures from elections after 1997 refer to submitted totals, and are presented when the final reviewed totals are not available. Expenditures from 1997 refer to submitted totals.
