= Allan Furlong =

Canadian politician (1942–2025)

Ontario MPP
- In office 1987–1990
- Preceded by: New riding
- Succeeded by: Drummond White
- Constituency: Durham Centre

Personal details
- Born: January 26, 1942 Noranda, Quebec, Canada
- Died: February 27, 2025 (aged 83)
- Party: Liberal
- Children: Katie Furlong; Mike Furlong
- Occupation: Lawyer

Allan Joseph William Furlong (January 26, 1942 – February 27, 2025) was a Canadian politician in Ontario, who was a Liberal member of the Legislative Assembly of Ontario from 1987 to 1990 who represented the riding of Durham Centre.

== Background ==
Furlong was educated at the University of New Brunswick, and was called to the Bar of New Brunswick in 1971. He worked as a lawyer before entering politics, and was a member of the firm Salmers and Furlong. He was also appointed acting small claims court judge in the judicial district of Durham, Ontario for bilingual trials.

== Politics ==
Furlong was elected to the Ontario legislature in the 1987 provincial election defeating his New Democratic Party opponent by 3,004 votes in the riding of Durham Centre. He served as a backbench supporter of David Peterson's government for the next three years.

The Liberals were defeated by the NDP in the 1990 provincial election, and Furlong lost his seat to NDP candidate Drummond White by 2,348 votes. He attempted to return to the legislature in the 1995 provincial election, but lost to Progressive Conservative candidate Jim Flaherty by over 15,000 votes amid a Progressive Conservative majority government victory.

Furlong endorsed Dalton McGuinty's bid to lead the Ontario Liberal Party in 1996.

== Later life and death ==
Furlong worked as the Executive Assistant to federal Liberal Member of Parliament Judi Longfield until she was defeated in January 2006 by Jim Flaherty. Coincidentally, Longfield once held the same position for Furlong.

Furlong died on February 27, 2025, at the age of 83.
