= Pat Perkins =

Scottish-born Canadian politician

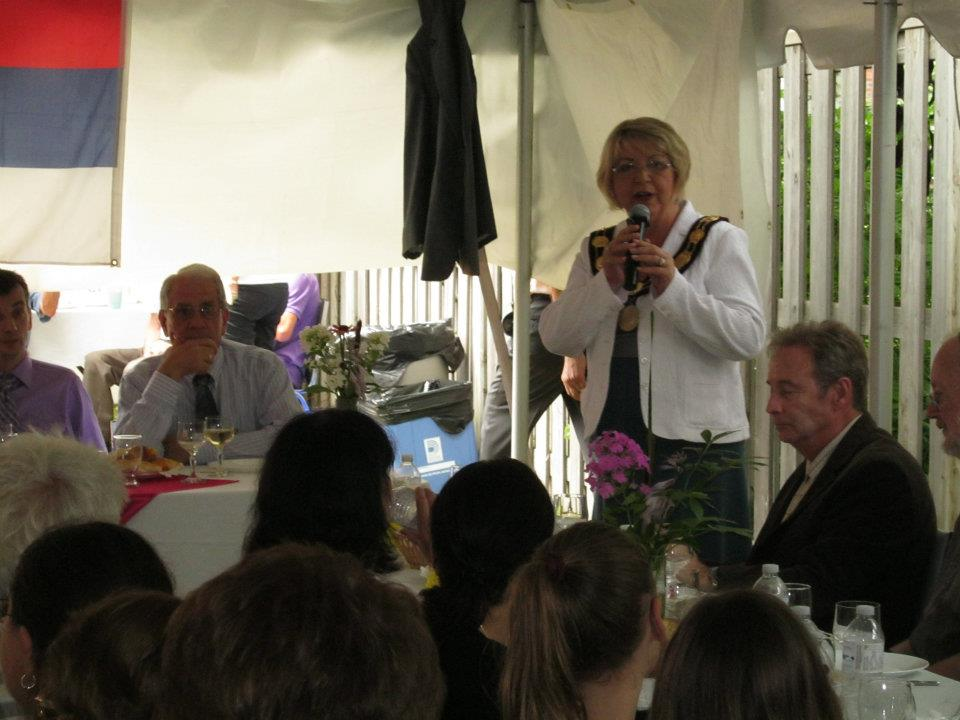
- Perkins in 2012

Member of Parliament for Whitby—Oshawa
- In office November 17, 2014 – August 4, 2015
- Preceded by: Jim Flaherty
- Succeeded by: Celina Caesar-Chavannes

Mayor of Whitby, Ontario
- In office 2006–2014
- Preceded by: Marcel Brunelle
- Succeeded by: Don Mitchell

Personal details
- Born: September 3, 1953 (age 73) Glasgow, Scotland
- Party: Conservative

Patricia "Pat" Perkins (born September 3, 1953) is a Scottish-Canadian politician. Perkins served as the Conservative Member of Parliament for Whitby—Oshawa from 2014 to 2015. She was elected in a by-election held on November 17, 2014, following the death of Jim Flaherty.

Prior to being elected to the House of Commons of Canada, Perkins was a Whitby, Ontario municipal councillor from 1997 until 2006 when she challenged incumbent mayor Marcel Brunelle, defeating him by less than 200 votes in the 2006 municipal election. Perkins served as mayor of Whitby for two terms from 2006 to 2014. She did not run for reelection to the mayoralty in the 2014 municipal election, due to the pending federal byelection.

Perkins was a member of the Standing Committee on Natural Resources and the Standing Committee on the Status of Women.

However, her term as an MP would be short-lived, as she was defeated in the federal election the following year in the redistricted riding of Whitby by Celina Caesar-Chavannes, whom she had earlier defeated in the by-election.

== Electoral record ==
=== Federal ===
2015 Canadian federal election: Whitby
Party	Candidate	Votes	%	±%	Expenditures
Liberal	Celina Caesar-Chavannes	29,003	44.95	+30.46	–
Conservative	Pat Perkins	27,154	42.09	-16.72	–
New Democratic	Ryan Kelly	6,677	10.35	-11.06	–
Green	Craig Cameron	1,403	2.17	-2.81	–
Independent	Jon O'Connor	279	0.43	–	–
Total valid votes/Expense limit		64,516	100.0		$233,003.12
Total rejected ballots		235	–	–	
Turnout		64,751	–	–	
Eligible voters		90,964			
Source: Elections Canada

Canadian federal by-election, November 17, 2014: Whitby—Oshawa
Party	Candidate	Votes	%	±%	
Conservative	Pat Perkins	17,033	49.2		–
Liberal	Celina Caesar-Chavannes	14,082	40.7		–
New Democratic	Trish McAuliffe	2,800	8.1		–
Green	Craig Cameron	496	1.4		–
Independent	John Turmel	107	0.3		–
Independent	Josh Borenstein	87	0.3		–
Total valid votes/Expense limit					
Total rejected ballots					
Turnout		34,605	31.76		
Eligible voters		108,969			
By-election due to the death of Jim Flaherty.
Source: "List of candidates — Whitby--Oshawa (Ontario) — By-election (Monday, November 17, 2014)". Elections Canada. Archived from the original on November 8, 2014.

=== Mayor of Whitby, Ontario ===
==== 2010 ====
Mayoral Candidate	Vote	%
Pat Perkins (X)	12,064	47.55
Rocky Varcoe	8,987	35.42
Marcel Brunelle	4,322	17.03

==== 2006 ====
Mayoral Candidate	Vote	%
Pat Perkins	9,784	50.5
Marcel Brunelle (X)	9,589	49.5
