= 2013 Ontario provincial budget =

Canadian provincial budget, 2013

2013 Budget of the Government of Ontario
- Presented: 2 May 2013
- Passed: 13 June 2013
- Country: Canada
- Parliament: 40th
- Party: Liberal
- Finance minister: Charles Sousa
- Total revenue: $116.8 billion
- Total expenditures: $127.6 billion
- Program Spending: $117.0 billion
- Deficit: $11.7 billion
- Debt: $272.8 billion
- Website: www.fin.gov.on.ca/en/budget/ontariobudgets/2013/

The 2013 Ontario budget, known as the Prosperous and Fair Ontario Act, is the budget for the province of Ontario for fiscal year 2013. It was presented to the Legislative Assembly of Ontario for its first reading on 2 May 2013 by Charles Sousa, the Minister of Finance of the Government of Ontario, and received Royal Assent on 13 June 2013.

== Presentation ==
The first reading of the budget bill was presented to the Legislative Assembly of Ontario by Ontario Liberal Party representative Charles Sousa on 2 May 2013. The CA$127 billion budget was designed to sufficiently appeal to Members of Provincial Parliament (MPPs) of the Ontario New Democratic Party (NDP), whose support the Liberal minority government needed in order for the bill to pass. Nearly $1 billion of budgetary expenditures were made "to meet NDP demands". The Progressive Conservative Party of Ontario had already stated it would oppose the budget.

== Debate in legislature and Royal Assent ==
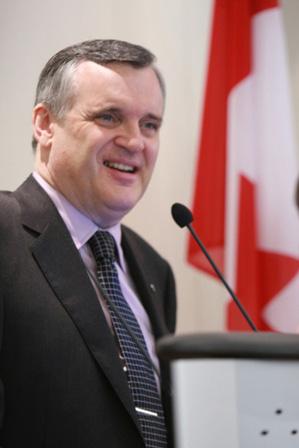
David Onley, the Lieutenant Governor of Ontario, granted Royal Assent to the budget bill on 13 June 2013.

After six debate sessions in the legislature from 7 May to 16 May, on 5 June a motion to arrange proceedings was taken, and the final second reading of the bill carried on division.

It was referred to the Standing Committee on Finance and Economic Affairs by Order of the House on 5 June 2013, which considered the bill until 11 June, when it returned an amended bill which was ordered for third reading and carried on division.

The bill was granted Royal Assent by David Onley, the Lieutenant Governor of Ontario, who signed it into law on 13 June 2013.

As a result of the passage of the Prosperous and Fair Ontario Act, numerous other Acts were amended or repealed.

== Revenues ==
Revenues for fiscal year 2013 were expected to be $116.8 billion, a 2.3 percent increase compared to the 2012 provincial budget. This included a reduction in corporate income tax revenues of 5.8 percent, an increase of 5.7 percent in personal income tax revenues, and an increase of 3.8 percent in sales tax revenues. The government also borrowed $33.4 billion, of which 70 percent was from domestic sources.

=== Taxation and investment ===
The provincial government will collaborate with the federal government to mitigate "aggressive tax avoidance" transactions used to attempt to avoid Ontario taxes, and to minimize tax losses as a result of corporations transferring profits to other jurisdictions. It proposed amendments to the Securities Act and Commodity Futures Act, adding new classes of securities fraud for attempted market manipulation and attempted fraud, clarifying insider trading regulations, and allowing the Ontario Securities Commission to share information with regulatory and law enforcement agencies. It also repealed the sunset provision to the Retail Sales Tax Act to enable the government to collect or secure tax debts. Specifically, the government would withhold clearance certificates until resolution of debts associated with the Alcohol and Gaming Regulation and Public Protection Act (1996), Fuel Tax Act, Gasoline Tax Act, Race Tracks Tax Act, and Tobacco Tax Act. These are expected to generate about $300 million in additional tax revenues from 2013 to 2016.

The budget also ensures automatic adoption of measures in the 2013 federal budget regarding capital cost allowance, lifetime capital gains exemptions, dividend tax credit on ineligible dividends, corporate and trust loss trading, leveraged life insurance arrangements, character conversion transactions, and other federal legislative tax changes. The high income threshold for the top personal marginal tax rate increased from $500,000 to $509,000 as a result of indexing.

Statutes amended by the budget include the Corporation Tax Act, Employer Health Tax Act, Fuel Tax Act, Gasoline tax Act, Income Tax Act, Land Transfer Tax Act, Mining Tax Act, Provincial Land Tax Act (2006), Retail Sales Tax Act, the Taxation Act (2007), and the Tobacco Tax Act. The budget eliminated specific information technology apprenticeship programs from the Apprenticeship Training Tax Credit, a tax credit program which was established in 2004.

== Expenditures ==
Exchange rate of the Canadian and US dollars from 1990 to 2014. The 2013 Ontario provincial budget assumed an exchange rate of CA$1 equivalent to US$0.98.

Assumptions for the budget include economic growth in real gross domestic product for the province of 1.5 percent in 2013, 2.3 percent in 2014, and 2.4 percent in 2015 and 2016, as well as the Canadian dollar exchange rate with respect to the United States dollar to be 98.0. Compared to the 2012 provincial budget, program spending was forecast to grow by 3 percent to $117 billion.

Expenditures were increased by $3 billion for healthcare and $2.4 billion for education, and were decreased by $2.2 billion for all other programs. The budget proposal included $1 billion allocated to the reserve fund.

The budget included $1 billion of expenditures in order to draw support from the NDP, the most significant of which were $404 million for welfare payments and credits, $260 million for improving access to home care, and $295 million for a youth employment program, the latter of which is the "only new program that will receive any significant new money" in the budget.

=== Business and economy ===
The Employer Health Tax exemption was increased from $450,000 to $500,000 for small businesses, and was eliminated for companies other than registered charities with at least $5 million in payroll in Ontario. The change was made effective 1 January 2014, and will subsequently be indexed to the Ontario Consumer Price Index every five years. About 12,000 businesses had their Employer Health Tax liability eliminated as a result.

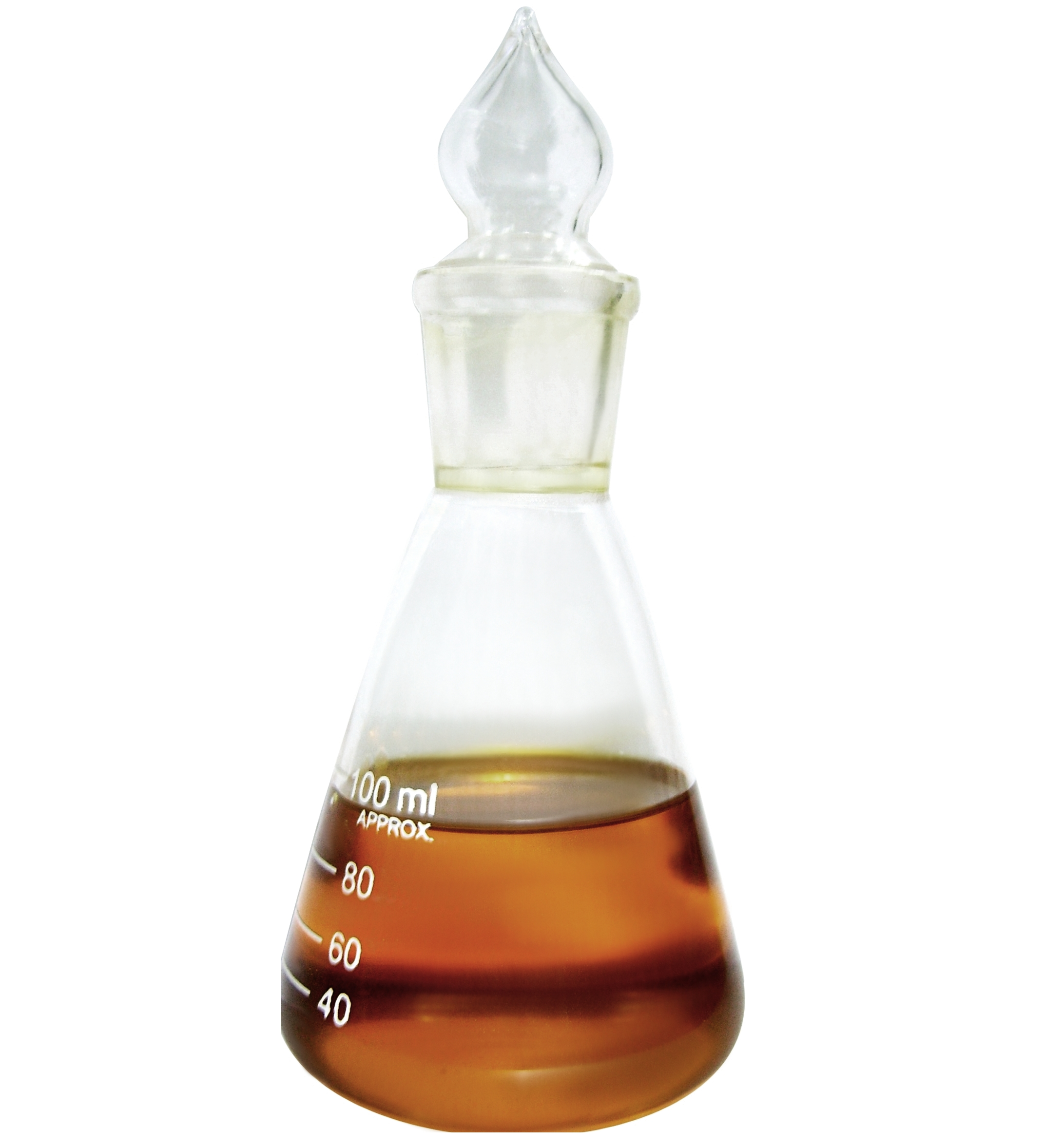
A sample of biodiesel fuel, for which the budget repealed the tax exemption effective 1 April 2014

The government announced the pending implementation of pooled registered pension plans per legislative changes by the federal government, and reform of the pension system. It also planned a 15 percent reduction in auto insurance premiums in 2014, after fraudulent claim issues were addressed.

A "Commercialization and Innovation Voucher" pilot program was proposed, enabling entrepreneurs and small businesses to access services from Ontario research institutions. The capital cost allowance was extended, representing about $265 million over three years. Effective 1 April 2014, the biodiesel tax exemption was repealed.

The government established a panel to review the provincial minimum wage legislation, which was required to report to the government within six months.

=== Infrastructure ===
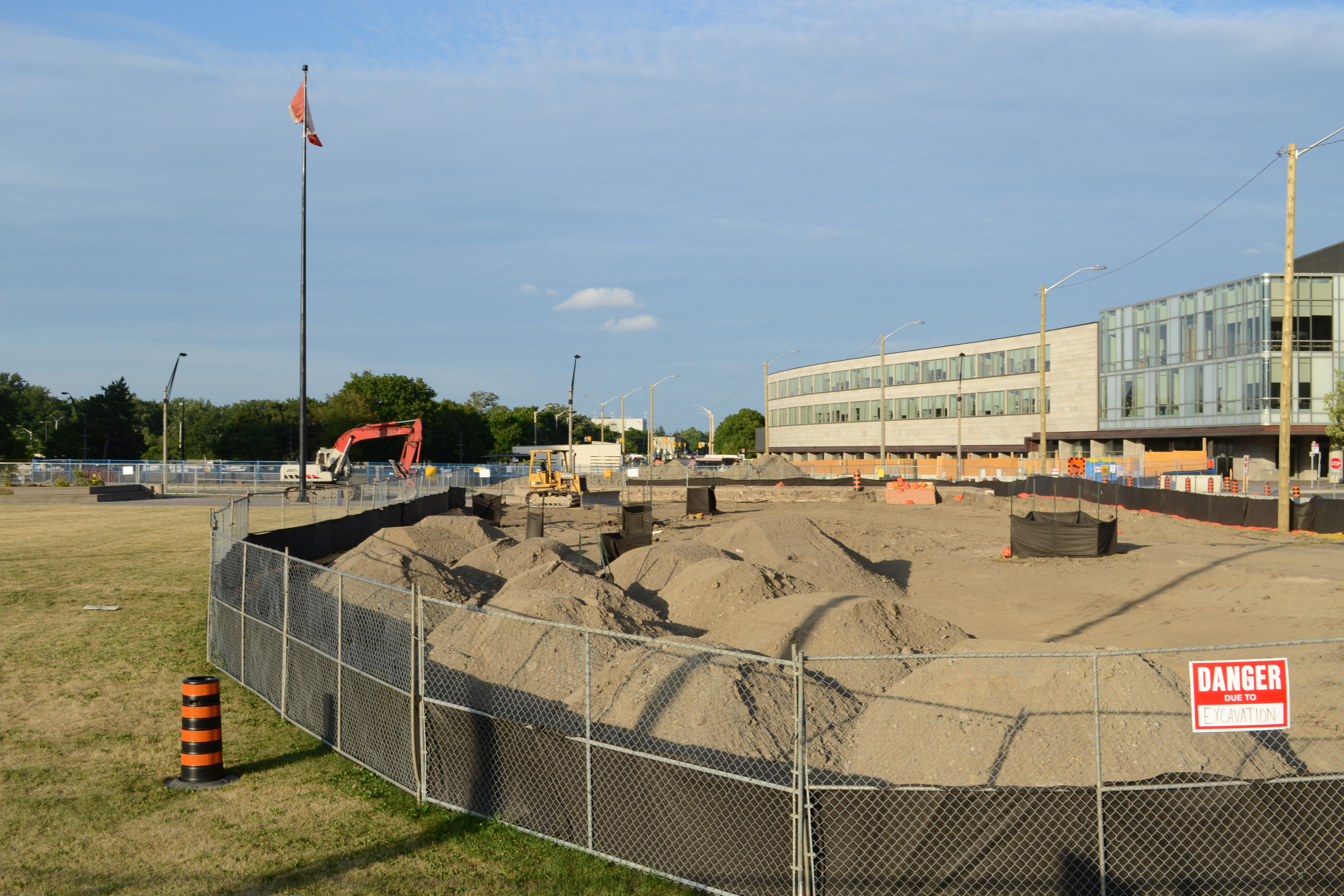
Construction of the York University TTC station, part of the extension of the TTC Yonge–University line to Vaughan

A $100 million fund was established for use by small and rural municipalities for infrastructure repair, part of the government's three year $35 billion infrastructure program. The government announced the construction of additional high-occupancy vehicle lanes (HOV) over ten years for highways 401, 404, 410, and 427, and that a toll on existing HOV lanes could be applied for single-occupancy vehicles, which would raise about $250 million annually. The budget also contained a recommendation to extend Highway 427 north to Major Mackenzie Drive.

Of the $13 billion allocated for infrastructure spending in the 2013 fiscal year, $6.3 billion was for transportation, including funding for the construction of the expansion of the Yonge–University line to Vaughan, and construction of the Confederation Line in Ottawa and the Ion rapid transit system in the Regional Municipality of Waterloo.

=== Healthcare and social assistance ===
The budget specified that 149 hospitals in the province would receive $17 billion in funding, the same as the previous year, and that community and home care expenditures would rise by 6 percent to $4.56 billion, approximately 10 percent of all healthcare expenditures in the budget. Overall healthcare expenditures were expected to increase by $3 billion.

Recipients of the Ontario Works and Disability benefit will retain $200 of employment earnings before the benefit is reduced. A legal aid fund was established to improve legal representation to individuals unable to afford it, providing $10 million annually from 2013 to 2015.

The budget introduced an income testing program for high-income seniors using the Ontario Drug Benefit program.

=== Education ===
Education spending increased by $2.4 billion compared to the 2012 budget in order to fund the all-day junior kindergarten program announced in the 2010 provincial budget.

== See also ==
- Ontario government debt
