= Whitby—Oshawa (federal electoral district) =

Former federal electoral district in Ontario, Canada

Coordinates: 43.92°N 78.92°W

Ontario electoral district
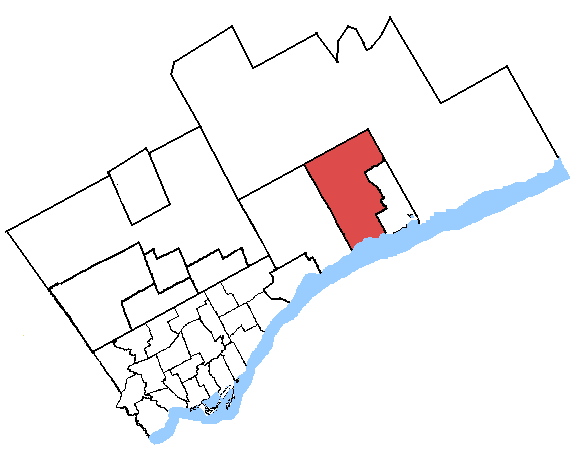

Defunct federal electoral district
- Legislature: House of Commons
- District created: 2003
- District abolished: 2015
- First contested: 2004
- Last contested: 2011
- District webpage: profile, map

Demographics
- Population (2011): 146,307
- Electors (2011): 99,155
- Area (km²): 222.30
- Census division(s): Durham
- Census subdivision(s): Whitby, Oshawa

Whitby—Oshawa was a federal electoral district in Ontario, Canada, represented in the House of Commons of Canada from 2004 to 2012. Following the 2012 federal electoral boundaries redistribution, the bulk of the district became part of the new Whitby district, while parts were transferred to Oshawa and Durham.

== History ==
The riding was created in 2003 and consists of 68 percent of the Whitby—Ajax district, 20 percent of the Oshawa district and three percent of the Durham district. The provincial electoral district was created from the same ridings in 2007.

The riding consisted of the Town of Whitby and northwestern section of the City of Oshawa (specifically, the portion of the city lying north and west of a line drawn from the western city limit east along King Street West, north along the Oshawa Creek, east along Rossland Road West, north along Simcoe Street North, and east along Winchester Road East to the eastern city limit).

== Demographics ==
According to the 2011 Canadian census

- Population: 146,307
- Ethnic Groups: 81.4% White, 5.5% Black, 4.3% South Asian, 1.7% Chinese, 1.7% Filipino, 1.4% Aboriginal
- Languages: 85.3% English, 2.1% French, 1.5% Italian, 1.1% Chinese
- Religion: 71.2% Christian (32.6% Catholic, 10.3% United Church, 8.3% Anglican, 2.6% Presbyterian, 2.4% Christian Orthodox, 2.1% Baptist, 10.4% Other Christian), 2.6% Muslim, 1.4% Hindu, 23.6% No religion.
- Average household income: $104,969
- Median household income: $89,608
- Average individual income: $48,444
- Median individual income: $37,099

== Members of Parliament ==
This riding has elected the following members of Parliament:

Parliament	Years	Member	Party
Whitby—Oshawa; Riding created from Durham, Oshawa and Whitby—Ajax
38th	2004–2006	Judi Longfield	Liberal
39th	2006–2008	Jim Flaherty	Conservative
40th	2008–2011	Jim Flaherty	Conservative
41st	2011–2014	Jim Flaherty	Conservative
41st	2014–2015	Pat Perkins	Conservative
Riding dissolved into Whitby, Durham and Oshawa

Pat Perkins was elected in a November 17, 2014 by-election following the death of Jim Flaherty who died in office on April 10, 2014.

== Election results ==
Canadian federal by-election, November 17, 2014: Whitby—Oshawa Death of Jim Flaherty
Party	Candidate	Votes	%	±%	Expenditures
Conservative	Pat Perkins	17,082	49.31	−9.11	–
Liberal	Celina Caesar-Chavannes	14,083	40.65	+26.54	–
New Democratic	Trish McAuliffe	2,801	8.08	−14.19	–
Green	Craig Cameron	500	1.44	−3.45	–
Independent	John "The Engineer" Turmel	101	0.29		–
Independent	Josh Borenstein	77	0.22		–
Total valid votes/expense limit			100.0		
Total rejected ballots					
Turnout		34,644	31.79	−31.45	
Eligible voters		108,969		+6.87	
Conservative hold		Swing		−17.89	
Source: "By-election Results". Elections Canada. 20 November 2014.

2011 Canadian federal election
Party	Candidate	Votes	%	±%	Expenditures
Conservative	Jim Flaherty	37,525	58.42	+7.43	$ 89,309.88
New Democratic	Trish McAuliffe	14,305	22.27	+8.01	22,721.23
Liberal	Trevor Bardens	9,066	14.11	-11.57	45,888.64
Green	Rebecca Harrison	3,143	4.89	-3.53	13,040.87
Libertarian	Josh Insang	198	0.31	+0.31	0.00
Total valid votes/Expense limit		64,237	100.00	+6.69	$102,342.39
Total rejected ballots		244	0.38	+0.07	
Turnout		64,481	63.24	+1.78	
Eligible voters		101,961		+3.76	
Source(s) "Official Voting Results — Forty-first General Election 2011". "Candidates' Details - Campaign Financial Summary (Part 4)". Elections Canada. 2 May 2011.

2008 Canadian federal election
Party	Candidate	Votes	%	±%	Expenditures
Conservative	Jim Flaherty	30,704	50.99	+7.13	$ 91,047.86
Liberal	Brent Fullard	15,460	25.68	-13.07	77,624.55
New Democratic	David Purdy	8,584	14.26	+1.21	4,335.08
Green	Doug Anderson	5,067	8.42	+4.82	8,056.85
Christian Heritage	Yvonne Forbes	395	0.66		1,744.08
Total valid votes/Expense limit		60,210	100.0	-9.85	$ 97,412.66
Total rejected ballots		190	0.31	-0.04	
Turnout		60,400	61.46	-9.14	
Electors on the lists		98,270		+3.51	
Source(s) "Official Voting Results — Fortieth General Election 2008". "Candidates' Details - Campaign Financial Summary (Part 4)". Elections Canada. 14 October 2008.

2006 Canadian federal election: Whitby—Oshawa
Party	Candidate	Votes	%	±%	Expenditures
Conservative	Jim Flaherty	29,294	43.86	+7.80	$ 88,591.06
Liberal	Judi Longfield	25,882	38.75	−6.29	78,783.33
New Democratic	Maret Sadem-Thompson	8,716	13.05	−1.00	9,898.30
Green	Ajay Krishnan	2,407	3.60	−1.25	238.56
Libertarian	Marty Gobin	274	0.41		258.75
Canadian Action	Tom Cochrane	217	0.32		120.18
Total valid votes/expense limit		66,790	100.0	+17.30	$ 88,730.91
Total rejected ballots		237	0.35	−0.14	
Turnout		67,027	70.60	+6.52	
Electors on the lists		94,938		+6.32	
Sources: Official Results, Elections Canada and Financial Returns, Elections Canada

2004 Canadian federal election: Whitby—Oshawa
Party	Candidate	Votes	%	Expenditures
Liberal	Judi Longfield	25,649	45.04	$80,842
Conservative	Ian MacNeil	20,531	36.06	$30,004
New Democratic	Maret Sadem-Thompson	8,002	14.05	$13,477
Green	Michael MacDonald	2,759	4.85	$0
Total valid votes		56,941	100.00	
Total rejected ballots		283	0.49	
Turnout		57,224	64.08	
Electors on the lists		89,296		
Percentage change figures are factored for redistribution. Conservative Party percentages are contrasted with the combined Canadian Alliance and Progressive Conservative percentages from 2000.
Sources: Official Results, Elections Canada and Financial Returns, Elections Canada.

== See also ==
- List of Canadian electoral districts
- Historical federal electoral districts of Canada
