= Drummond White =

Canadian politician

Ontario MPP
- In office 1990–1995
- Preceded by: Allan Furlong
- Succeeded by: Jim Flaherty
- Constituency: Durham Centre

Personal details
- Born: March 19, 1951 Toronto, Ontario, Canada
- Died: November 25, 2022 (aged 71)
- Party: New Democrat (Note: White sat briefly as an Independent in 1994.)
- Spouse: Norah Love
- Children: 3
- Occupation: Social worker, family counsellor

Drummond White (March 19, 1951 – November 25, 2022) was a politician in Ontario, Canada. He was a New Democratic Party member of the Legislative Assembly of Ontario from 1990 to 1995.

== Background ==
White grew up in Oshawa, Ontario. He graduated with an Honours BA (University of Toronto), a Bachelor in Social Work (BSW), a Master in Social Work (Wilfrid Laurier University), and a Research Diploma in Social Work (University of Toronto). White is currently self-employed as a family counsellor and social worker. His work emphasizes mediation and family assessment.

He is married to Norah Love and they have three adult children: Amanda, Devin, and Lenore.

== Politics ==
White became involved in politics because he was concerned about the tax burden and the rising cost of raising a family. He said, "Nothing is more important in terms of family values than having bread on the table." White had been involved in social justice, cooperative and political campaigns since high school. He was elected to the Ontario legislature in the 1990 provincial election, defeating incumbent Liberal Allan Furlong and Progressive Conservative Jim Flaherty by over 2,000 votes in the Greater Toronto Area riding of Durham Centre.

The NDP won a majority in this election and White served as the parliamentary assistant to the Minister of Municipal Affairs on two occasions between 1992 and 1995. White dealt especially with the Office of the Greater Toronto Area and participated in the creation of the Waterfront Trail. Drummond White also drove the reforms to the Municipal and Planning Acts through provincial parliament.

In 1992, White and fellow Durham MPP Jim Wiseman became involved in a minor controversy when it was found they were billing taxpayers for the cost of renting a shared apartment in Toronto. He claimed that working long hours as an MPP justified his need for the apartment. Due to the publicity, he and Wiseman ended the lease in August 1992.

In December 1992, White moved a resolution advocating the creation of a regulating body for social workers in Ontario. At the time, Ontario was the only province that did not have a regulating body for social workers. A spokesman for the Ministry of Social Services said that legislation for social work was a low priority. While he was not successful in getting a bill passed during his time as MPP, a similar bill called the Social Work and Social Service Work Act was enacted in 1998. Drummond was the final witness and speaker before the legislative committee that dealt with the bill and was pleased when this legislation was finally enacted.

In February 1994, White was charged with common assault. As a result of the charges he resigned from the NDP caucus and also from his role as parliamentary assistant to the Minister of Municipal Affairs. He sat as an Independent member until his case was resolved. In March 1994, a judge dismissed the charge against White. It turned out that he had confronted his 14-year-old daughter over cigarettes and tried to search her jacket. A tug of war ensued which led to the assault charge. The judge, John Payne said, "There was an indirect use of force which could be construed as an assault, but there was no physical assault." The incident was reported at school the next day which was why the charge was laid. "Mr. White was concerned about his daughter smoking," said Mr. Payne. "He acted like any concerned parent would." Shortly after the trial, White returned to the NDP caucus and his role as assistant to Minister of Municipal Affairs.

In the 1995 provincial election, White was defeated in his bid for re-election, finishing third against Conservative Jim Flaherty and Liberal Allan Furlong.

== Later life ==
After leaving politics, White returned to his profession as a social worker. In 1996 he served as co-chair to the Durham Region Coalition for Social Justice which sought to prevent the Harris government from reducing social services. He also participated in other Durham advocacy groups such as Save Our Schools and Save Our Shores.

He joined the board of the Canadian Association of Social Workers. In 2008, he was elected Secretary-Treasurer. In 2005, he was chosen as the Ontario recipient of the Canadian Association of Social Workers' Distinguished Service Award. Drummond was also on the board of the Ontario Association of Social Workers (OASW) and was elected vice-president in charge of social and professional advocacy.

In addition to social and professional activity, Drummond has also been very involved in his local community serving as a lay chaplain with the Unitarian church in Durham (UUCD) and acting in community theatre.

On April 1, 2019, he made his entrance to Corus Quay.

== Electoral record ==
1990 Ontario general election
Party	Candidate	Votes	%	±%
New Democratic	Drummond White	12,594	35.9	+5.0
Liberal	Allan Furlong	10,246	29.2	-11.2
Progressive Conservative	Jim Flaherty	9,126	26.0	-1.5
Family Coalition	Nino Maltese	1,186	3.4	-
Confederation of Regions	Phil Wyatt	1,087	3.1	-
Green	David Hubbell	857	2.4	+1.2
The Globe and Mail:

1995 Ontario general election
Party	Candidate	Votes	%	±%
Progressive Conservative	Jim Flaherty	25,107	58.3	+32.3
Liberal	Allan Furlong	9,808	22.8	-6.4
New Democratic	Drummond White	8,120	18.9	-17.0
Elections Ontario:
