= Canadian House of Commons Standing Committee on Finance =

Standing committee of the House of Commons of Canada

The House of Commons Standing Committee on Finance (FINA) is a standing committee of the House of Commons of Canada.

== Mandate ==
- pre-budget consultations
- briefing sessions by departmental officials on federal government programs
- examination of planned expenditures of the Department of Finance and the Canada Revenue Agency
- review of Monetary Policy Reports of the Governor of the Bank of Canada
- review of the Minister of Finance's Economic and Fiscal Update
- consideration of proposed finance legislation

== Membership ==
As of the 45th Canadian Parliament:

Party	Member	Riding
Liberal	Karina Gould, chair	Burlington, ON
Conservative	Jasraj Singh Hallan, vice chair	Calgary East, AB
Bloc Québécois	Jean-Denis Garon, vice chair	Mirabel, QC
Conservative	Sandra Cobena	Newmarket—Aurora, ON
Conservative	Pat Kelly	Calgary Crowfoot, AB
Conservative	Eric Lefebvre	Richmond—Arthabaska, QC
Liberal	Carlos Leitão	Marc-Aurèle-Fortin, QC
Liberal	Kent MacDonald	Cardigan, PE
Liberal	Jake Sawatzky	New Westminster—Burnaby—Maillardville, BC
Liberal	Ryan Turnbull	Whitby, ON

== Subcommittees ==
- Subcommittee on Agenda and Procedure
