= 2009 Canadian federal budget =

2009 Budget of the Canadian Federal Government
- Presented: 27 January 2009
- Passed: 3 February 2009
- Country: Canada
- Parliament: 40th
- Party: Conservative
- Finance minister: Jim Flaherty
- Total revenue: C$218.6 billion
- Total expenditures: C$274.2 billion
- Debt payment: C$29.4 billion
- Deficit: C$55.6 billion
- Debt: C$519.1 billion
- Website: http://www.budget.gc.ca/2009/pdf/budget-planbugetaire-eng.pdf Canada's Economic Action Plan

The Canadian federal budget for the 2009–10 fiscal year was presented to the House of Commons of Canada by Finance Minister Jim Flaherty on January 27, 2009. The federal budget included $20 billion in personal income tax cuts as well as major investments in infrastructure.

The Budget Implementation Act, 2009 was introduced in the House of Commons on February 6, 2009, and it received royal assent on March 12, 2009, enacting the legislative changes necessary to implement the budget. It was announced as the "Budget 2009: Economic Action Plan", with accompanying publicity.

The NDP and the Bloc announced shortly following the presentation of the budget that they would not support it in its initial form, but the budget was passed on February 3, 2009, with the support of the Liberals. All MPs for the NDP and the Bloc and the six Liberal members from Newfoundland and Labrador voted against the budget.

== Economic crisis and parliamentary dispute ==
The government's Fall 2008 Economic and Fiscal Statement noted significant expected economic deterioration as a result of a global economic slowdown. Although the government did not forecast a deficit for the 2008–09 fiscal year, the Statement warned that any measures to deal with the economic slowdown would require deficit spending. Additionally, Finance Minister Jim Flaherty noted prior to tabling the Statement that a "technical" recession was possible. Despite pressure to quickly announce a stimulus package to offset deteriorating economic conditions, the Statement also proposed spending cuts of up to $2 billion on various programs, and the sale of various federal properties.

The opposition parties, who at the time held a majority of the seats in the House of Commons, criticized the lack of immediate economic stimulus, and threatened to defeat the government in a vote of non-confidence, leading the Governor General to subsequently prorogue Parliament from December 3, 2008, until January 26, 2009. As the federal budget is ordinarily tabled in early Spring, this action would not normally have had an impact on its timing. However, the deepening economic crisis forced the government to advance its plans. On December 20, 2008, the government announced it would spend approximately $30 billion in order to stimulate the economy while forecasting a deep deficit for a five-year period. Additionally, the tabling of the 2009 federal budget was moved up to January 27, 2009 - just one day after Parliament's return.

== Highlights ==
A $33.7 billion deficit for the 2009–10 fiscal was announced during the deposition of the budget on January 27, 2009, with a projected deficit of $29.7 billion for the following year as well as additional deficits until 2013 for a total of $85 billion over five years while Flaherty also announced a $1.1 billion deficit for the end of the 2008–09 financial year. It is the first deficit announced since the 1996–97 fiscal year. $12 billion was earmarked for various new infrastructure projects including roads, internet broadband access with additional funding for renovations on aging infrastructures as well as for green infrastructure projects. $8 billion was also announced for social housing renovation projects, $1.5 billion for job training, $2.7 billion for short-term loans for the auto industry as well as various income and corporate tax cuts and tax credits up to $20 billion for individuals and $2 billion for businesses. Among the tax measures included were a new home renovation tax credit of up to $1350, the extension of the EI benefits by five weeks for the next two years as well as the increase of the basic personal amount to $10,320 before any payment of federal income tax. The government estimated that the $40 billion in economic stimulus and other measures would create close to 200 000 jobs while it forecast a one percent growth of the economy over the next two years.

== Reception ==
The Liberal Party, now headed by Michael Ignatieff who replaced Dion during the prorogation of the Parliament, supported the budget but also proposed in return an amendment, which passed 214–84. The amendment would force the government to present occasional reports on the progress and costs of the budget. Both the NDP and the Bloc Québécois opposed the budget. The Bloc cited the loss of transfer payments for the province while the NDP cited a lack of funding for the vulnerable and also criticized the infrastructure funding as well as pay-equity reforms introduced in November. Six Liberal MPs from Newfoundland and Labrador also expressed opposition to the budget citing that the province would lose up to $1.6 billion in transfer payments as it no longer collects equalization. Ignatieff permitted his members to vote against his party lines. The budget passed 211 to 91. Among popular opinion, a Strategic Council poll indicated that 62% of Canadians were in favour of the budget against 38% who were not in favour while Canadians were split on whether the government failed the economy in Canada.

== Areas of direction ==
Some of the key items in the Economic Action Plan budget were:

- $12 billion in new infrastructure stimulus funding for roads, bridges, broadband internet access, electronic health records, laboratories and border crossings across the country.
- $20 billion in personal income tax relief
- $7.8 billion to build quality housing, stimulate construction and enhance energy efficiency.
- Increasing the basic personal amount that all Canadians can earn without paying federal income tax.
- Raising the upper limit of the two lowest personal income tax brackets by 7.5 per cent so that Canadians can earn more at lower tax rates.
- Increasing the amount that low- and middle-income families can earn before their federal child benefits are phased out.
- Investing $580 million to effectively double the tax relief provided by the Working Income Tax Benefit.
- Providing tax savings of up to $150 a year for seniors by increasing the Age Credit amount by $1,000.
- The temporary Home Renovation Tax Credit of up to $1,350 for eligible home renovations and alterations.
- An increase to the Home Buyers' Plan withdrawal limit to $25,000 from $20,000 to help Canadians buy a first home.
- A new First-Time Home Buyers' Tax Credit that will provide up to $750 in tax relief when purchasing a first home.
- $300 million over two years to the ecoENERGY Retrofit program.
- $1 billion over two years for renovation and energy retrofits to social housing.
- $400 million over two years to build housing for low-income seniors.
- $75 million over two years to build social housing for persons with disabilities.
- $200 million over two years to support social housing in the North.
- $2 billion over two years in low-cost loans to municipalities to improve housing-related infrastructure.
- $1 billion over five years for a green infrastructure fund.
- Up to $500 million over the next two years to accelerate infrastructure projects in small communities.
- $1 billion over two years to expedite new "ready-to-go" provincial, territorial and municipal projects.
- $4 billion over two years to restore aging infrastructure.
- $500 million over two years to Recreational Infrastructure Canada (RInC) to build and renew community recreational facilities.
- $2 billion for repair, maintenance and construction of post-secondary institutions.
- $750 million to the Canada Foundation for Innovation to support leading-edge research infrastructure.
- $50 million to the Institute for Quantum Computing for a new research facility.
- $250 million over two years for deferred maintenance at federal laboratories.
- $500 million to Canada Health Infoway for electronic health records.
- $225 million over three years to extend broadband coverage to unserved communities.
- $407 million for improvements to Via Rail service.
- $72 million over five years to improve railway safety.
- $130 million to Parks Canada for Trans-Canada Highway twinning.
- $150 million for visitor improvements and upgrades to Parks Canada.
- $212 million to renew the Champlain Bridge in Montreal.
- $57 million for the renewal of other key federal bridges across Canada.
- $80 million over three years to expand and modernize border service facilities.
- $217 million for core commercial fishing harbours across Canada.
- $323 million over two years to restore federal buildings.
- $87 million over two years for key Arctic research facilities.
- $20 million in each of two years to improve the accessibility of federally owned buildings for persons with disabilities.
- $296 million to enhance air passenger security.
- $1 billion for clean energy research, development and demonstration projects.
- $110 million over three years for space robotics research and development.
- $81 million over two years to accelerate the cleanup of federal contaminated sites.
- $1 billion for green infrastructure projects.
- $1 billion over two years for renovation and energy retrofits to social housing.
- $300 million over two years to the ecoENERGY Retrofit program.
- $1 billion for clean energy research, development and demonstration projects.
- $87 million over two years for key Arctic research facilities.
- $245 million over two years for the cleanup of federal contaminated sites.
- $10 million to improve government environmental reporting.
- A 14-week extension of work-sharing agreements to a one-year maximum.
- $50 million over two years to cover severance pay owed to eligible employees of bankrupt companies.
- A five-week extension to all regular Employment Insurance (EI) benefits for two years.
- Continued low EI premium rates of $1.73 for 2009 and 2010, providing relief of $4.5 billion over two years.
- $500 million to extend EI benefits for workers in longer-term training.
- $1.5 billion over two years for EI and non-EI training programs.
- $55 million over two years for youth employment.
- $60 million over three years for the Targeted Initiative for Older Workers.
- $40 million a year to launch the $2,000 Apprenticeship Completion Grant.
- $87.5 million over three years to expand the Canada Graduate Scholarships program.
- $50 million for the Pan-Canadian Framework for the Assessment and Recognition of Foreign Qualifications.
- An additional $50 billion for the Insured Mortgage Purchase Program, increasing its size to $125 billion.
- $13 billion to increase the lending of Crown corporations, of which $5 billion will be delivered through the new Business Credit Availability Program.
- $12 billion for a Canadian Secured Credit Facility to support financing of vehicles and equipment.
- An increase in the loan limit for small businesses under the Canada Small Business Financing Program.
- A two-year, 100-per-cent capital cost allowance (CCA) rate for investment in computers.
- A two-year extension of the temporary 50-per-cent straight-line accelerated CCA rate to investment in manufacturing or processing machinery and equipment undertaken in 2010 and 2011.
- Over $440 million in savings for Canadian industry over the next five years by eliminating tariffs on a range of machinery and equipment.
- $170 million over two years to support innovation and marketing for the forestry sector.
- $500 million over five years to facilitate new agricultural initiatives.
- $50 million over three years to strengthen slaughterhouse capacity.
- $175 million to buy new coast guard vessels and refurbish aging vessels.
- Over $335 million over two years for cultural and arts programs, including television, print media, museums, libraries and local theatres.
- $40 million over two years for tourism marketing activities.
- $50 million per year for marquee festivals and other tourist events.
- An increase to $500,000 in the amount of small business income eligible for the reduced federal tax rate of 11 per cent.
- $30 million over two years for the Canada Business Network.
- $200 million over two years to support industrial research for small and medium-size businesses.
- More than $1 billion over five years for a Southern Ontario development agency to support economic development in Southern and Eastern Ontario.
- $1 billion over two years for a Community Adjustment Fund (CAF) to lessen the impact of economic adjustment.
- $50 million for a new regional agency, and economic development in the North.
- A one-year extension of the temporary 15-per-cent mineral exploration tax credit.
- $515 million over two years to accelerate "ready-to-go" First Nations projects in three priority areas: schools, water, and critical community services.
- $400 million over two years for social housing for First Nations on reserves.
- $100 million over three years in the Aboriginal Skills and Employment Partnership.
- $75 million in a two-year Aboriginal Skills and Training Strategic Investment Fund.
- $305 million over two years to improve health outcomes for First Nations and Inuit.
- $20 million over two years to improve child and family services on reserves.
