= 2012 Canadian federal budget =

2012 Budget of the Canadian Federal Government
- Presented: 29 March 2012
- Passed: 14 June 2012
- Country: Canada
- Parliament: 41st
- Party: Conservative
- Finance minister: Jim Flaherty
- Total revenue: C$255.0 billion^{‡}
- Total expenditures: C$276.1 billion
- Deficit: C$25.9 billion
- Website: Jobs, Growth, and Long-Term Prosperity
- ^{‡}Numbers in italics are projections.

The Canadian federal budget for fiscal year 2012–13 was presented to the House of Commons of Canada by Finance Minister Jim Flaherty on 29 March 2012. Among the most notable elements of the federal budget were changes to Old Age Security and a reduction of the budget for the Canadian Forces and the Canadian Broadcasting Corporation.

The budget presentation was also used to announce that the penny would no longer be minted as of late 2012.

== Key elements ==
These initiatives were to be delivered in periods that varied from one to five years:

- The age of eligibility for Old Age Security would gradually rise from 65 to 67 between 2023 and 2029.
- Funding for the Canadian Broadcasting Corporation was reduced by 10% to approximately $1 billion per year. Funding for the National Film Board of Canada and Telefilm Canada was also reduced 10%.
- 19,200 federal public service jobs were eliminated, approximately 4.8% of all federal public service jobs. Of those, 7,200 would be via attrition, and 12,000 via layoffs. About 4,800 of the affected employees work in Ottawa or Gatineau.
- Extension of Mineral Exploration Tax Credit and Small Business Hiring Tax Credit for one year, elimination of the Overseas Employment Tax Credit (OETC) by 2016, elimination of Atlantic Investment Tax Credit and creation of efforts to crack down on tax avoidance and close loopholes.

=== Programs and departments eliminated ===
Programs and departments cut as part of the budget included:

- Assisted Human Reproduction Canada (effective 13 March 2013)
- National Round Table on the Environment and the Economy
- Katimavik
- National Aboriginal Health Organization (effective 30 June 2012)
- Experimental Lakes Area (effective 31 March 2013)
- Canadian Immigration Interim Federal Health Program (effective 30 June 2012)
- Arctic atmospheric research lab called PEARL – Polar Environment Atmospheric Research Laboratory (effective 30 April 2012)

== Effects ==
As a result of the budget, in April 2012 the CBC announced it would cut its English Services budget by $86 million, of which $43 million was a reduction of programming and the remainder the elimination of 256 jobs. It said it would also cut jobs in other departments, totalling 650 throughout the corporation. The changes took effect in June 2012. It cancelled the TV series InSecurity and the television program Connect with Mark Kelley. The changes included a reduction of the budget for CBC News by $10 million, the elimination of 88 jobs in that division, and the shuttering of its news bureaus in South America and Africa. CBC Radio had its budget reduced by $3 million, eliminated 18 jobs, and stated it would no longer commission radio dramas. Other programming cuts included the radio program Dispatches and CBC Sports, which had a $4 million budget reduction and recast Sports Weekend as a seasonal program. Compared to its budget in 2011–12, the CBC operating budget was cut by $27.8 million in 2012–13, $69.6 million in 2013–14, and $115 million in 2014–15.

Agriculture and Agri-Food Canada announced in April 2012 that it would close the Cereal Research Centre operated at the University of Manitoba. The Public Service Alliance of Canada (PSAC) stated that 5,561 of its members in 23 government departments had received notices from the federal government about the potential termination of their jobs. This includes 308 jobs at the Canadian Food Inspection Agency, which will cut its operating budget by $56 million. The Professional Institute of the Public Service of Canada announced that the employment of 1,500 of its members would be affected. Health Canada would eliminate up to 840 jobs, including 150 scientists.

The Department of National Defence will cut at least 1,149 public service jobs, about 585 of which are in the Canadian Forces and 234 at the Defence Research and Establishment Canada.

On 1 May 2012, PSAC announced that Parks Canada would eliminate 638 jobs, and that 1,689 of its "scientists, engineers, technicians, mechanics, carpenters and program managers" would be affected by changes, and that 908 employees of Human Resources and Skills Development Canada, 490 employees of Aboriginal Affairs and Northern Development Canada, and 180 employees of Transport Canada would also be affected. Library and Archives Canada is expected to eliminate 105 jobs, and Statistics Canada is expected to cut 273.

In November 2012, the Treasury Board president Tony Clement stated that the federal government had cut 10,980 public service jobs, of which 7,500 were by attrition or not replacing employees who had quit.

=== Accelerated Capital Cost Allowance and Mining Exploration Credit ===
In 2011, Statistics Canada reported that the nonfinancial corporate sector (NFCS) was "sitting on more than $583 billion in Canadian currency and deposits, and more than $276 billion in foreign currency."

The Canadian government has introduced measures to encourage business to invest in the Canadian economy. There were five federal corporate tax cuts over a period of five years with the last 1.5 percent reduction taking effect on 30 December 2011, bringing the federal corporate tax to 15 per cent.

Flaherty explained that the one-year extension on the Mineral Exploration Tax Credit and Small Business Hiring Tax Credit introduced in the 2012 budget are business incentives "to compel Canadian corporations to invest some $525 billion of dead cash back into the economy." In their analysis of the 2012 budget the Canadian Labour Congress argued that "non-financial corporations" have used their federal incentives and tax cuts (Note: Prior to 2007, the federal corporate income tax rate was over 20%. Since 2007 the corporate tax rate was lowered. By 2012 it was 15%.) to "buy up their own shares, to increase dividends, and to increase their cash holdings" which amounted to "close to $500 billion of surplus cash" that they were not investing in job creation.

== Reception ==
This budget was criticized because of cuts to health care, the old age security, environmental protection and because of the expansion of $6 billion in corporate tax cuts for corporations, banks, and oil companies.
