= Ecoenergy =

- Location: Canada
- Website: NRCan

Natural Resources Canada's (NRCan's) ecoENERGY retrofit program provides financial support to homeowners, small and medium-sized businesses, public institutions and industrial facilities to help them implement energy saving projects that reduce energy-related greenhouse gases (GHGs) and air pollution.

There was originally a residential program, and a business program. Natural Resources Canada's Office of Energy Efficiency is no longer offering the ecoENERGY Retrofit Incentive for Buildings, the commercial/institutional component of the ecoENERGY Retrofit financial incentives for existing homes, buildings and industrial processes.

The business program ended on June 6, 2012.

== See also ==
- EnerGuide for New Houses
- EnerGuide
- EnerGuide for Houses
