= Ryan Turnbull (politician) =

Canadian politician and social innovation consultant

Ryan Turnbull MP

Member of Parliament for Whitby
- Incumbent
- Assumed office October 21, 2019
- Preceded by: Celina Caesar-Chavannes

Parliamentary Secretary to the Minister of Finance and National Revenue
- Incumbent
- Assumed office June 5, 2025

Parliamentary Secretary to the Secretary of State (Canada Revenue Agency and Financial Institutions)
- Incumbent
- Assumed office June 5, 2025

Personal details
- Born: July 15, 1977 (age 49) Brampton, Ontario
- Party: Liberal
- Spouse: Suze Turnbull
- Children: 2
- Profession: Chief Executive Officer, Management Consulting Firm

Ryan Turnbull MP (born July 15, 1977) is a Canadian Liberal Party politician and social innovation consultant who was elected to represent the riding of Whitby in the House of Commons of Canada in the 2019 Canadian federal election.

== Education and early career ==
Turnbull studied philosophy and applied ethics for 8 years earning both a Bachelor's Degree (with high honours) and a Master's Degree from Carleton University.

He has taught, developed curriculum, and overseen research at a number of post-secondary institutions, including Carleton University, Sogang University, University of London (St. Georges Medical School), Ryerson University and Durham College. He has also taught business ethics and corporate social responsibility at Ted Rogers School of Business Management for several years.

Turnbull founded a management consulting company focused on social innovation and ethics. His company, Eco-Ethonomics Inc. has managed more than 350 projects focused on employing social innovation methods to addressing complex and systemic problems like systemic poverty, racism, and gender equality.

== Political career ==
A member of the Liberal Party of Canada, Turnbull sits on the Canadian House of Commons Standing Committee on Finance and the Canadian House of Commons Standing Committee on Industry, Science and Technology.

Turnbull previously sat on the House of Commons Standing Committee on Human Resources, Skills and Social Development and the Status of Persons with Disabilities and the Standing Committee on Procedure and House Affairs. During this time he participated in filibusters against investigations into WE Charity scandal and the Chinese government interference in the 2019 and 2021 Canadian federal elections

Turnbull is also the chair of the Social Innovation Caucus, which is responsible for helping to build social enterprises—businesses that are owned by a nonprofit organization, and are directly involved in the production and/or selling of goods and services for the blended purpose of generating income and achieving social, cultural, and/or environmental aims.

On June 4 2025 Turnbull was named Parliamentary Secretary to the Minister of Finance.

At the time of the 2025 Canadian federal election, he lived in Pickering, Ontario.

== Electoral record ==
2025 Canadian federal election: Whitby
** Preliminary results — Not yet official **
Party	Candidate	Votes	%	±%	Expenditures
Liberal	Ryan Turnbull	36,000	52.59	+7.50	
Conservative	Steve Yamada	30,053	43.91	+9.43	
New Democratic	Kevin Goswell	1,672	2.44	–11.97	
Green	Andrew Di Lullo	515	0.75	–0.86	
Centrist	Nouman Mian	209	0.31	N/A	
Total valid votes/expense limit					
Total rejected ballots					
Turnout		68,449	72.84		
Eligible voters		93,969			
Liberal notional hold		Swing		–0.97	
Source: Elections Canada

2021 Canadian federal election: Whitby
Party	Candidate	Votes	%	±%	Expenditures
Liberal	Ryan Turnbull	27,375	44.1	+0.4	$89,015.09
Conservative	Maleeha Shahid	22,271	35.9	+0.4	$105,175.68
New Democratic	Brian Dias	8,766	14.1	±0.0	$13,630.16
People's	Thomas Androvic	2,682	4.3	+3.1	$5,881.18
Green	Johannes Kotilainen	972	1.6	-3.8	$3,254.22
Total valid votes/expense limit		62,066	–	–	$127,815.88
Total rejected ballots		332			
Turnout		62,398	61.50		
Eligible voters		101,465			
Source: Elections Canada

2019 Canadian federal election: Whitby
Party	Candidate	Votes	%	±%	Expenditures
Liberal	Ryan Turnbull	30,182	43.7	-1.25	$90,618.58
Conservative	Todd McCarthy	24,564	35.5	-6.59	$114,623.57
New Democratic	Brian Dias	9,760	14.1	+3.75	$6,319.41
Green	Paul Slavchenko	3,735	5.4	+3.23	$28,189.54
People's	Mirko Pejic	860	1.2		$3,185.65
Total valid votes/expense limit		69,101	100.0		
Total rejected ballots		415			
Turnout		69,516	70.8		
Eligible voters		98,190			
Liberal hold		Swing		+2.67	
Source: Elections Canada
