= Whitby (federal electoral district) =

Federal electoral district in Ontario, Canada

Ontario electoral district
- Interactive map of riding boundaries from the 2025 federal election
- Coordinates: 43.93°N 78.96°W

Federal electoral district
- Legislature: House of Commons
MP
Ryan Turnbull
Liberal
- District created: 2013
- First contested: 2015
- Last contested: 2025
- District webpage: profile, map

Demographics
- Population (2021): 138,501
- Electors (2015): 90,964
- Area (km²): 155
- Pop. density (per km²): 893.6
- Census division: Durham
- Census subdivision: Whitby (part)

Whitby is a federal electoral district (riding) in Ontario consisting of the entire town of Whitby, Ontario. The boundaries for Whitby were created by the 2012 federal electoral boundaries redistribution and were legally defined in the 2013 representation order. The riding came into existence upon the call of the 42nd Canadian federal election in October 2015. It was created out of the district of Whitby—Oshawa. It is a key Liberal-Conservative marginal seat.

Following the 2022 Canadian federal electoral redistribution, the riding lost all of its territory north of Highway 407 to the new riding of Pickering—Brooklin. This change had come into effect upon the call of the 2025 Canadian federal election.

== Demographics ==
According to the 2021 Canadian census

Ethnic groups: 62.2% White, 12.0% South Asian, 9.1% Black, 3.6% Chinese, 2.6% Filipino, 2.4% Indigenous, 1.6% West Asian, 1.2% Latin American, 1.0% Arab

Languages: 75.5% English, 1.7% Urdu, 1.6% Tamil, 1.5% Mandarin, 1.3% French, 1.1% Spanish, 1.0% Italian

Religions: 54.3% Christian (25.7% Catholic, 4.9% Anglican, 4.2% United Church, 2.7% Christian Orthodox, 1.9% Pentecostal, 1.4% Presbyterian, 1.1% Baptist, 12.4% Other), 6.7% Muslim, 5.4% Hindu, 31.6% None

Median income: $48,000 (2020)

Average income: $63,000 (2020)

== Members of Parliament ==
This riding has elected the following members of Parliament:

Parliament	Years	Member	Party
Whitby; Riding created from Whitby—Oshawa
42nd	2015–2019	Celina Caesar-Chavannes	Liberal
42nd	2019–2019	Celina Caesar-Chavannes	Independent
43rd	2019–2021	Ryan Turnbull	Liberal
44th	2021–2025	Ryan Turnbull	Liberal
45th	2025–present	Ryan Turnbull	Liberal

== Election results ==
Graph of general election results in Whitby (minor parties that never got 2% of the vote or didn't run consistently are omitted)

=== 2023 representation order ===
2025 Canadian federal election
Party	Candidate	Votes	%	±%
Liberal	Ryan Turnbull	35,624	52.70	+7.61
Conservative	Steve Yamada	29,620	43.82	+9.34
New Democratic	Kevin Goswell	1,638	2.42	–11.99
Green	Andrew Di Lullo	506	0.75	–0.86
Centrist	Nouman Mian	206	0.30	N/A
Total valid votes		67,594	99.33	
Total rejected ballots		457	0.67	+0.11
Turnout		68,051	71.85	+10.66
Eligible voters		94,712		
Liberal notional hold		Swing		–0.87
Source: Elections Canada

2021 federal election redistributed results
Party	Vote	%
Liberal	23,284	45.09
Conservative	17,804	34.48
New Democratic	7,443	14.41
People's	2,273	4.40
Green	833	1.61
Total valid votes	51,637	99.44
Rejected ballots	292	0.56
Registered voters/ estimated turnout	84,863	61.19

=== 2013 representation order ===
2021 Canadian federal election
Party	Candidate	Votes	%	±%	Expenditures
Liberal	Ryan Turnbull	27,375	44.1	+0.4	$89,015.09
Conservative	Maleeha Shahid	22,271	35.9	+0.4	$105,175.68
New Democratic	Brian Dias	8,766	14.1	±0.0	$13,630.16
People's	Thomas Androvic	2,682	4.3	+3.1	$5,881.18
Green	Johannes Kotilainen	972	1.6	-3.8	$3,254.22
Total valid votes/expense limit		62,066	–	–	$127,815.88
Total rejected ballots		332			
Turnout		62,398	61.50		
Eligible voters		101,465			
Source: Elections Canada

2019 Canadian federal election
Party	Candidate	Votes	%	±%	Expenditures
Liberal	Ryan Turnbull	30,182	43.7	-1.25	$90,618.58
Conservative	Todd McCarthy	24,564	35.5	-6.59	$114,623.57
New Democratic	Brian Dias	9,760	14.1	+3.75	$6,319.41
Green	Paul Slavchenko	3,735	5.4	+3.23	$28,189.54
People's	Mirko Pejic	860	1.2		$3,185.65
Total valid votes/expense limit		69,101	100.0		
Total rejected ballots		415			
Turnout		69,516	70.8		
Eligible voters		98,190			
Liberal hold		Swing		+2.67	
Source: Elections Canada

2015 Canadian federal election
Party	Candidate	Votes	%	±%	Expenditures
Liberal	Celina Caesar-Chavannes	29,003	44.95	+30.46	$53,971.84
Conservative	Pat Perkins	27,154	42.09	−16.72	$62,752.73
New Democratic	Ryan Kelly	6,677	10.35	−11.06	$11,930.35
Green	Craig Cameron	1,403	2.17	−2.81	$1,685.15
Independent	Jon O'Connor	279	0.43	–	$1,811.93
Total valid votes/Expense limit		64,516	100.0		$233,804.45
Total rejected ballots		235	–	–	
Turnout		64,751	–	–	
Eligible voters		90,964			
Source: Elections Canada

2011 federal election redistributed results
Party	Vote	%
Conservative	31,034	58.81
New Democratic	11,297	21.41
Liberal	7,644	14.49
Green	2,628	4.98
Libertarian	168	0.32

== See also ==
- List of Canadian electoral districts
- Historical federal electoral districts of Canada
