= Jim Flaherty =

Canadian politician (1949–2014)

The Honourable Jim Flaherty PC MSC
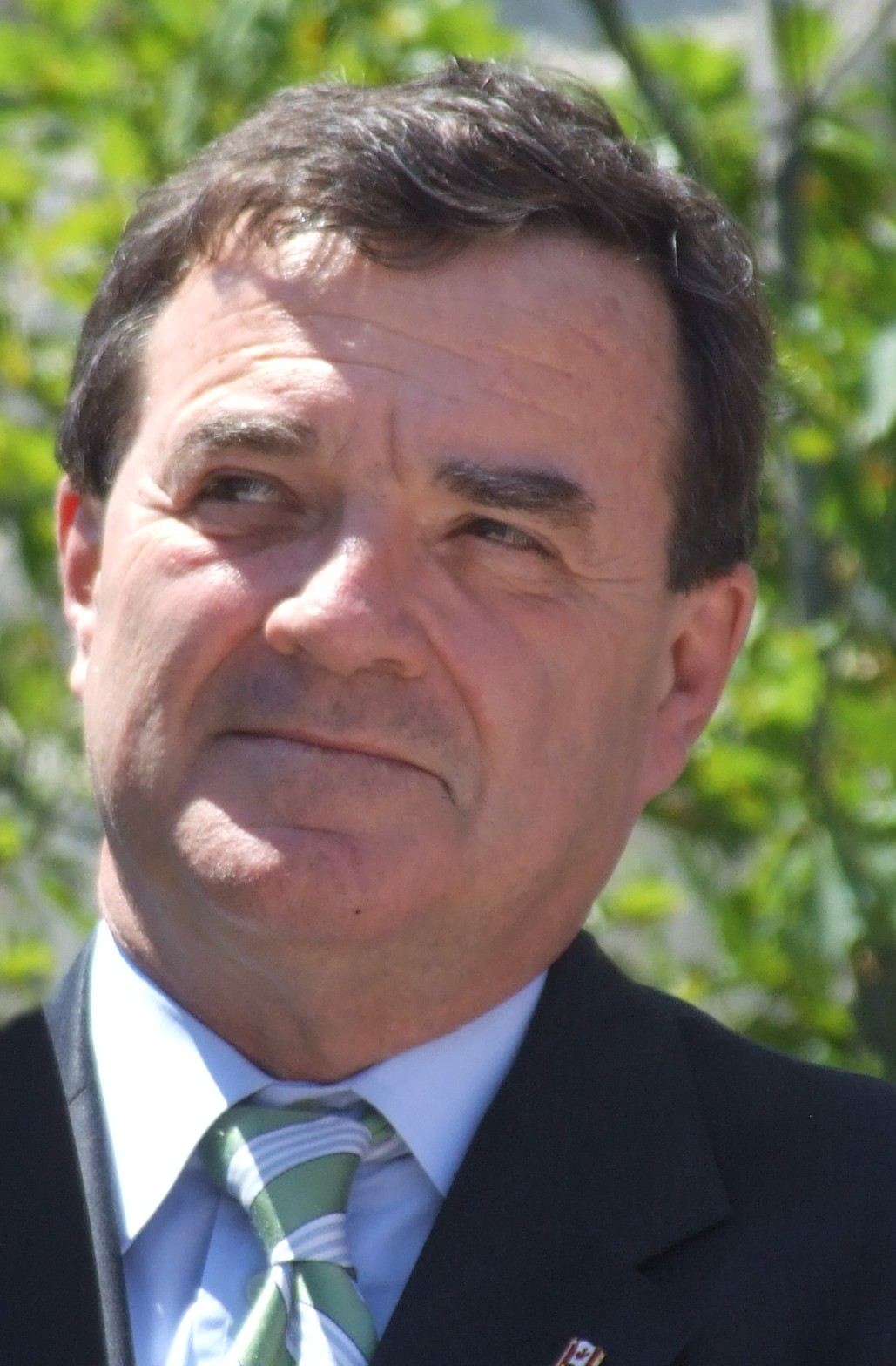
- Flaherty in 2007

Minister of Finance
- In office February 6, 2006 – March 18, 2014
- Prime Minister: Stephen Harper
- Preceded by: Ralph Goodale
- Succeeded by: Joe Oliver

6th Deputy Premier of Ontario
- In office February 8, 2001 – April 14, 2002
- Premier: Mike Harris
- Preceded by: Ernie Eves
- Succeeded by: Elizabeth Witmer

Ontario Minister of Finance
- In office February 8, 2001 – April 14, 2002
- Premier: Mike Harris
- Preceded by: Ernie Eves
- Succeeded by: Janet Ecker

Member of Parliament for Whitby-Oshawa
- In office January 23, 2006 – April 10, 2014
- Preceded by: Judi Longfield
- Succeeded by: Pat Perkins

Member of the Ontario Provincial Parliament for Whitby-Ajax (Durham Centre; 1995–1999)
- In office June 8, 1995 – January 23, 2006
- Preceded by: Drummond White
- Succeeded by: Christine Elliott

Personal details
- Born: James Michael Flaherty; December 30, 1949 Lachine, Quebec, Canada
- Died: April 10, 2014 (aged 64) Ottawa, Ontario, Canada
- Party: Conservative (federal); Progressive Conservative (provincial)
- Spouse: Christine Elliott (m. 1986)
- Children: 3
- Education: Princeton University (AB); York University (LLB)

James Michael Flaherty PC MSC (December 30, 1949 – April 10, 2014) was a Canadian politician who served as the federal minister of finance from 2006 to 2014 under Conservative Prime Minister Stephen Harper.

First elected to the Legislative Assembly of Ontario in 1995 under the Progressive Conservative (PC) banner, Flaherty would sit as a member of Provincial Parliament (MPP) until 2006, also serving in a number of Cabinet positions from 1997 to 2002 during Premier Mike Harris' government. He unsuccessfully ran for the PC leadership twice.

Flaherty entered federal politics and ran for the Conservative Party in the 2006 election. With his party forming government, Prime Minister Harper named Flaherty as finance minister. As finance minister, Flaherty reduced personal income taxes and corporate taxes, reduced the goods and services tax to 5%, introduced the tax-free savings account, and dealt with the Great Recession; the $55.6 billion deficit in the 2009 Canadian federal budget was eliminated in 2014 as a result of major spending cuts. Flaherty tabled nine federal budgets and was the longest continuously serving minister in Harper's government until his resignation in 2014.

Flaherty died of a heart attack three weeks after his resignation as minister. His widow, Christine Elliott, later served as the deputy premier of Ontario.

== Early life, education and career (1949–1995) ==
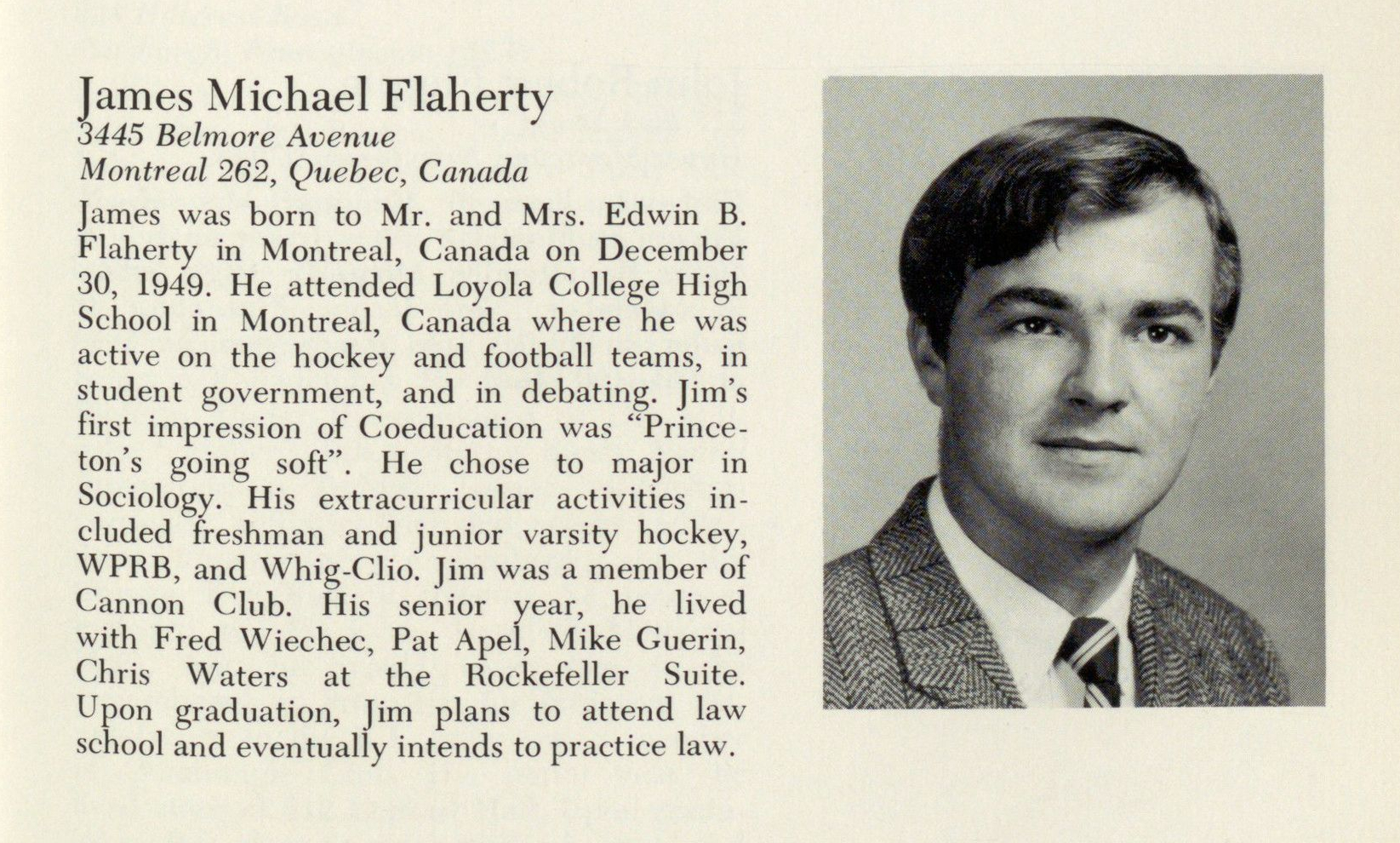
Flaherty in the Princeton University yearbook, 1970

Flaherty was born on December 30, 1949 in Lachine, Quebec, the son of Mary (née Harquail), who was from a "prosperous family", and Edwin Benedict Flaherty, an entrepreneur and chemist. His parents were from New Brunswick, his father from Loggieville and his mother from Campbellton. He was the sixth of eight children. He attended Bishop Whelan High School and Loyola High School, Montreal. Flaherty attended Princeton University, where he graduated cum laude with an A.B. in sociology in 1970. He wrote his senior thesis, titled "Camp X: Sensitivity Training with a Group of Young Adults", on the sensitivity training at Camp X, a military training institute in Ontario. He then received a Bachelor of Laws degree from Osgoode Hall Law School of York University.

He practised law for 20 years, and was a founding partner of Flaherty Dow Elliott after splitting from Gilbert Wright and Flaherty. Now known as Flaherty & McCarthy LLP (formerly Flaherty Dow Elliott & McCarthy LLP), is a law firm specializing in civil tort / vehicle accident and personal injury litigation.

Flaherty ran for in the provincial election of 1990, finishing third against New Democrat Drummond White and Liberal Allan Furlong in the riding of Durham Centre. He ran again and was elected in the 1995 election.

== Provincial political career (1995–2005) ==
=== Cabinet ===
He was named Minister of Labour in the cabinet of Premier Mike Harris on October 10, 1997, and kept this position until after the 1999 election. He also served as interim Solicitor General and Minister of Correctional Services from April 27 to July 27, 1998.

Flaherty was re-elected in the 1999 election in the redistributed riding of Whitby–Ajax, and was named Attorney General with responsibility for Native Affairs on June 17, 1999. On February 8, 2001, he was appointed Minister of Finance and Deputy Premier. He was a key promoter of tax credits for parents sending their children to private and denominational schools, which the Tories had campaigned against in 1999. In June 2001, Flaherty was evicted from his constituency office in a theatrical action by Ontario Coalition Against Poverty which aimed to bring home the effects of his policies.

=== 2002 Ontario PC leadership bid ===
Flaherty ran to succeed Harris in the 2002 PC leadership election, but lost to frontrunner Ernie Eves, his predecessor as finance minister. Flaherty's campaign featured attacks on Eves, calling him a "serial waffler" and a "pale, pink imitation of Dalton McGuinty".

Flaherty's leadership campaign focused on "law and order" themes, and one of his proposals was to make homelessness illegal. His purported plan was to have special constables encourage homeless persons to seek out shelters or hospitals. He argued that his policy would save the lives of homeless persons; leadership rival Elizabeth Witmer and other critics described it as callous, and ineffective against the root causes of homelessness.

Flaherty also promised to implement further tax cuts, carry through with plans to create a tax credit for parents sending their children to private school, and privatizing the Liquor Control Board of Ontario. Flaherty also emerged as a social conservative in this campaign, particularly a staunch stance against abortion and his association with anti-abortion groups. On April 15, 2002, Eves demoted him to the less-prominent position of Minister of Enterprise, Opportunity and Innovation. Flaherty retained this position until the Tories were defeated in the provincial election of 2003. Flaherty himself was re-elected by a reduced margin.

=== Opposition and 2004 Ontario PC leadership bid ===
Following the defeat of the Conservatives, Eves announced that he would resign as leader in 2004. Flaherty declared himself a candidate to succeed him, but was defeated by John Tory by a margin of 54 percent to 46 percent on the second ballot of the PC leadership election held on September 18, 2004. His supporters included former cabinet ministers John Baird, Tim Hudak and Norm Sterling. His 2004 leadership campaign was similar to that of 2002. He emphasized fiscally conservative themes, including further tax cuts and greater privatization. He promised to create EXCEL scholarships, whereby students attaining high grades in high school would have half their university tuition paid by the government. Until 2005, Flaherty served as finance critic in John Tory's shadow cabinet.

== Federal finance minister (2006–2014) ==
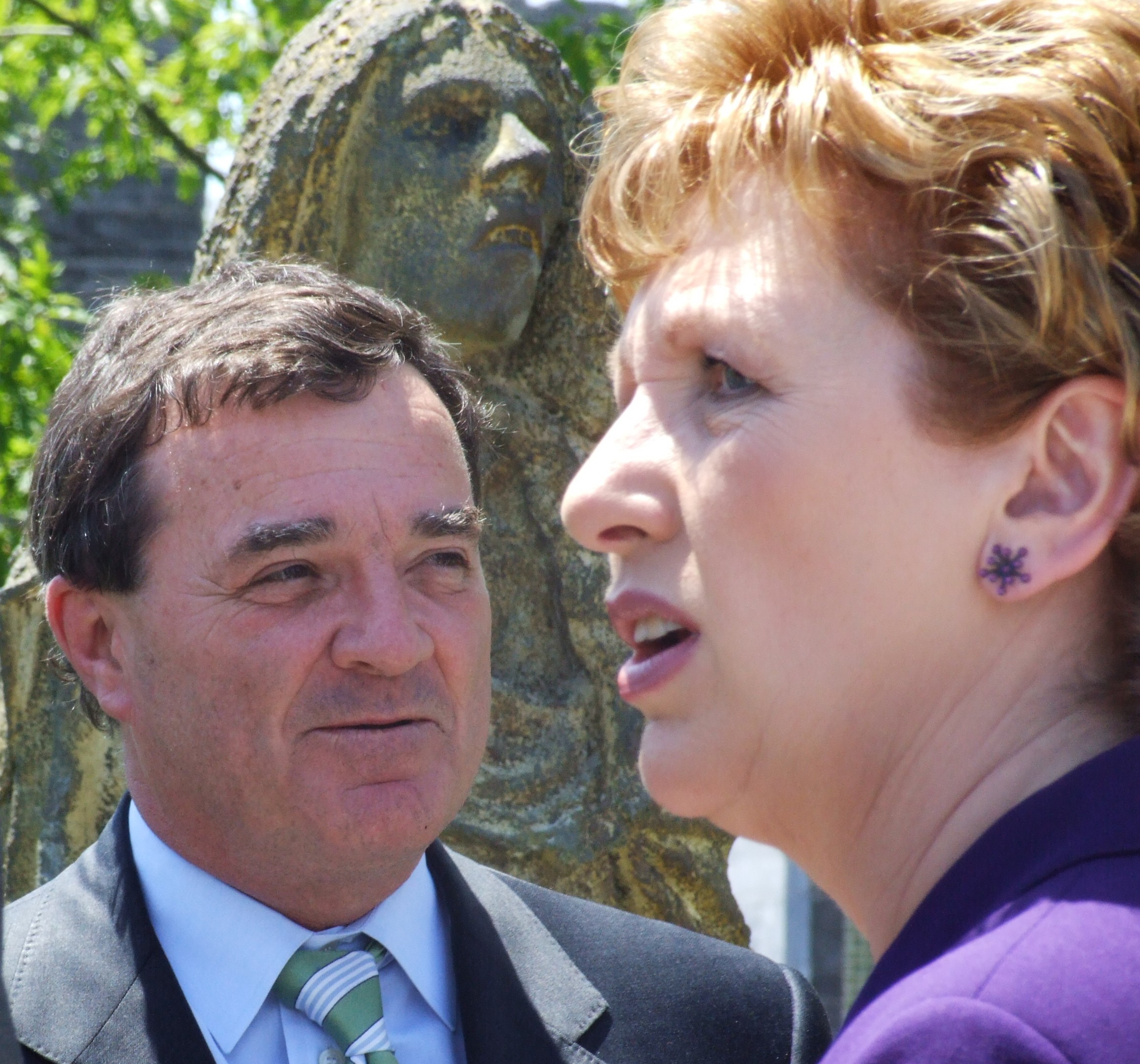
Flaherty stands behind Irish President Mary McAleese

On June 13, 2005, the Canadian news website bourque.org reported that a meeting of prominent Conservative organizers and fundraisers had been held to plan for a Flaherty bid for the leadership of the federal party should Stephen Harper resign. In December 2005, the 2006 general election was called. Flaherty resigned his seat in the Ontario legislature to run for the Conservative Party of Canada in the riding of Whitby—Oshawa, narrowly unseating incumbent Judi Longfield.

Flaherty's wife, Christine Elliott, won Flaherty's former provincial seat in a by-election, defeating Longfield who was running as the provincial Liberal candidate. This marked the first time in Canadian history that a husband and wife have simultaneously represented the same electoral district at two different levels of government.

On February 6, 2006, Flaherty was sworn in as Minister of Finance in Stephen Harper's new Conservative Cabinet. He was also appointed Minister Responsible for the Greater Toronto Area. In his capacity as Minister of Finance, he served as a Governor of the World Bank and the International Monetary Fund.

He announced his resignation from the cabinet on March 18, 2014.

=== October 31, 2006, income trust announcement ===
Flaherty was a central figure in the debate surrounding the new proposed rules for taxation of Canadian income trusts. His announcement on October 31, 2006 of a rule change to tax income trusts levelled the playing field between forms of business such that businesses operating as income trusts no longer enjoyed a tax advantage over businesses operating as corporations. The announcement was accompanied by a further planned reduction in the corporate rate so that the two moves together were not expected to generate additional revenue for the government.

Flaherty said that income trusts would cost the government $500 million annually in lost tax revenue and shift the burden onto ordinary people. The Canadian Association of Income Trust Investors said that foreign takeovers of Canadian income trusts have had the opposite effect and caused decrease in federal government tax revenues.

Diane Francis, editor-at-large for the National Post, urged that the rule changes be recanted, arguing that there were flaws in the policy which hurt Canadian investors.

Special hearings by the House of Commons Standing Committee on Finance commenced January 30, 2007. John McCallum, the Liberal finance critic, asked Flaherty to explain the reasoning behind the change in income trust tax policy. McCallum said "Your first problem is that having lured hundreds of thousands of ordinary Canadians into income trusts by promising not to raise taxes you then cut them off at the knees."

On February 28, 2007, the committee released their report, Taxing Income Trusts: Reconcilable or Irreconcilable differences?, recommending a reduction of the proposed tax to 10 percent from 31.5 percent.

==== Fullard opposition ====
On August 21, 2008, Brent Fullard, president of the Canadian Association of Income Trust Investors, challenged Flaherty to debate supposed tax leakage associated with income trusts. Fullard announced he would put up $50,000, payable to his favourite charity. Given the minister's "current crusade on financial literacy", Fullard believed a suitable charitable cause would be a scholarship for business education. "By doing this we could help repair the damage caused by the Minister's statement that Ontario is the last place to invest." Flaherty turned down the request. "The tax fairness plan is law. The Minister made his position clear before the finance committee and there is no need for further debate," according to his press spokesperson.

=== Registered Disability Savings Plan ===
In Budget 2007, Flaherty introduced the Registered Disability Savings Plan (RDSP). The RDSP is a long-term savings plan to help Canadians with disabilities and their families save. The RDSP resembles its other saving counterparts, the RRSP and the RESP, and is meant to ensure a secure future for people with disabilities. The Government assists these families by contributing through grants and bonds that supplement contributions.

=== Tax-Free Savings Account ===
In Budget 2008, Flaherty introduced the Tax-Free Savings Account (TFSA), a flexible, registered, general-purpose savings vehicle that allows Canadians to earn tax-free investment income to more easily meet lifetime savings needs.

The measure, which came into effect on January 2, 2009, has clear differences with the Registered Retirement Savings Plan (RRSP). There is a tax deduction for contributions to an RRSP, and withdrawals of contributions and investment income are all taxable. In contrast, there are no tax deductions for contributions to a TFSA. Beginning in 2013, contribution room in the TFSA has increased to $5,500 per calendar year. The Canada Revenue Agency describes the difference between the TFSA and an RRSP as follows: "An RRSP is primarily intended for retirement. The TFSA is like an RRSP for everything else in your life."

Flaherty's measure was supported by many organizations, including the C.D. Howe Institute, which stated: "This tax policy gem is very good news for Canadians, and Mr. Flaherty and his government deserve credit for a novel program."

=== EUROMoney Magazine ===
In 2009, Flaherty received an award from EUROMoney Magazine, naming him Finance Minister of the Year. Flaherty is the first Canadian to hold this honour. It says he "enhanced his country's reputation for sound fiscal policy that takes full account of social justice, while a strong regulatory regime has kept the financial sector out of the chaos."

=== Federation of Canadian Municipalities report on infrastructure ===
Flaherty responded to a report from the Federation of Canadian Municipalities that suggested that cities had an infrastructure deficit of $123 billion and the federal government should step up with some cash with the suggestion cities should stop "whining" and repair their own crumbling infrastructure.

Calgary Mayor Dave Bronconnier claimed Flaherty sidestepped responsibility for billions in infrastructure dollars being sought, when Flaherty advised municipalities to "do their job" because the feds are "not in the pothole business". "Let’s get on with the job and stop complaining about it and do their job", Flaherty continued, noting the Building Canada fund will inject $33 billion into cities to help deal with the infrastructure crunch. However Bronconnier said the plan is merely a "repackaging" of a number of pre-existing funding arrangements. The Building Canada Fund was strongly criticized for being designed to fail, due to excessive red tape, which has delayed much of the funding from being awarded.

Mississauga Mayor Hazel McCallion went further by issuing a challenge to Flaherty to publicly debate the need for permanent federal funding for the repair and upkeep of municipal roads and bridges. McCallion said "Flaherty has stated in the media that some of the municipalities have not kept up with infrastructure and did not establish adequate reserves. Well, I can tell him that he is dead wrong. The facts are that Mississauga has carefully set aside reserves for infrastructure for years." McCallion noted that cities are trying to maintain 58 per cent of public infrastructure with eight cents of every tax dollar. Flaherty did not accept Hazel McCallion's offer to debate.

=== Department of Finance contracts questioned ===
Flaherty said his office broke government contracting rules in hiring MacPhie & Company to help write the 2007 budget speech and provide advice on how to sell the document. MacPhie & Company was awarded the $122,000 contract without tender by Flaherty's office. On February 7, 2008, Liberal finance critic John McCallum formally called on Auditor General Sheila Fraser to conduct an audit into the untendered contract awarded by Flaherty to MacPhie & Company for work done in advance of the 2007 budget.

The Toronto Star determined that several people who supported Flaherty when he was an Ontario cabinet minister or who supported his two failed bids to lead the Ontario Tories were awarded employment contracts or given appointments. The employment contracts awarded were under the $25,000 Treasury Board contract bidding limit. Bronwen Evans received a $24,877.50 contract to write speeches for Flaherty from June 2006 until last February. David Curtain, who worked on Flaherty's Ontario leadership campaign, received $24,877.50 to write the finance minister's first budget speech. Curtain was also paid $3,350 to write a keynote address earlier in 2008 for Flaherty. Lawyer James Love, who donated $63,000 to Flaherty over two leadership campaigns, was appointed to the Royal Canadian Mint. Another Flaherty donor, Carol Hansell, was appointed to the board of directors of the Bank of Canada in October 2006. Toronto family law lawyer Sara Beth Mintz, an Ontario Progressive Conservative Party vice-president, received $24,900 for budget "analysis, assessment and advice". MacPhie & Company also got another contract for $24,645 for work done on Advantage Canada, a long-term, national economic plan. Opposition parties said they were suspicious that contracts were coming in just under $25,000 in order to give business to Flaherty's friends and supporters.

On May 13, 2008, Flaherty appeared before the Public Accounts committee, facing questions about multiple sole-sourced contracts worth more than $300,000 that were given by the government. Flaherty says he was unaware his former chief of staff broke government rules in handing a well-connected Tory an untendered contract to write the 2007 budget speech.

=== Foreign Account Tax Compliance Act ===
The Foreign Account Tax Compliance Act is American legislation that requires cooperation, legal and financial, from Canada (and other nations), in order to be implemented. The official reason given for this legislation was efforts to crack down on tax evasion. However, in a letter Flaherty sent to U.S. newspapers in September 2011, he said the law would waste resources and raise privacy concerns. On February 5, 2014, Flaherty signed Canada on as a participant to FATCA through an Intergovernmental Agreement (IGA).

=== Abolishing the penny ===
While announcing Economic Action Plan 2012 on March 29 in the House of Commons, Flaherty explained that, by February 2013, the government would be phasing out the penny. The cost to produce each new penny was 1.6 cents, which exceeded the penny's face value by 0.6 cents. The estimated savings for taxpayers from phasing out the penny is about $11 million a year. Even though the government eliminated the penny from circulation, Canadians can continue to use pennies for cash transactions indefinitely for businesses that choose to accept them or they can redeem rolled pennies at their financial institutions.

=== Public-private partnerships ===
The now defunct Crown Corporation PPP Canada was created during Flaherty's tenure to highlight the commitment of the federal government to Public-private partnerships (PPP, P3). It was responsible for promoting and facilitating Public-private partnerships, and operated under Infrastructure Canada. PPP Canada managed the “P3 Canada fund” where provinces, territories, and municipalities could apply for funding from the federal government. PP Canada served as Canada's centralized PPP Unit from its creation in 2009 until it was dissolved in 2018 under Prime Minister Justin Trudeau.

Flaherty intended to fund most of Canada's new infrastructure though Public-private partnerships. He intervened in the 2013 Regina wastewater plant funding referendum, during which he wrote an open letter arguing that voters should select the P3 option. His arguments included the promise of allocating $58.5 million of federal funding if the P3 option is selected.

=== Building Canada Plan ===
On May 21, 2013, Flaherty introduced his 2013 Budget. The Budget contained a new Building Canada Plan for the construction of public infrastructure such as roads, bridges, transit and port facilities. The plan provides $53 billion in investments to support local and economic infrastructure projects, including more than $47 billion in new funding over 10 years, starting in 2014–2015.

=== Budgets presented ===
Flaherty presented nine budgets to the Canadian Parliament as Minister of Finance.

- 2006 Canadian federal budget
- 2007 Canadian federal budget
- 2008 Canadian federal budget
- 2009 Canadian federal budget
- 2010 Canadian federal budget
- 2011 Canadian federal budget (presented in March 2011 and again in June).
- 2012 Canadian federal budget
- 2013 Canadian federal budget
- 2014 Canadian federal budget

=== Resignation from Cabinet ===
On March 18, 2014, Flaherty announced that he was resigning as Minister of Finance in order to return to the private sector. While he had openly discussed health challenges associated with managing bullous pemphigoid, including taking prescription steroids, he said the decision was reached after many months of consultation with his family and that his health was not a factor in his decision. Flaherty continued sitting in the House of Commons as an MP until his death three weeks later. At the time of his resignation, he held the honour of being the Longest continuous serving cabinet minister in a single portfolio in the 28th Canadian Ministry.

== Honours ==
An office building in Ottawa, housing employees from the Department of Finance, is named after Flaherty.

With the 2017 Canada Day Honours, Flaherty was awarded with a posthumous Meritorious Service Cross.

Ribbon	Description	Notes
	Meritorious Service Cross	2017: Christine Elliott and the late Jim Flaherty founded Abilities Centre, a unique, world-class facility in Whitby that engages people of all ages and abilities in sports, the arts and personal growth activities. Thanks to their dedicated support, the centre has become a local and international example of inclusiveness where everyone can participate equally.
	Queen Elizabeth II Golden Jubilee Medal for Canada	2002:
	Queen Elizabeth II Diamond Jubilee Medal for Canada	2012: As the Minister of the Crown and as an elected Member of the House of Commons of Canada, The Honourable James M. Flaherty was awarded the medal as a member of the Canadian order of precedence.

== Personal life and death ==
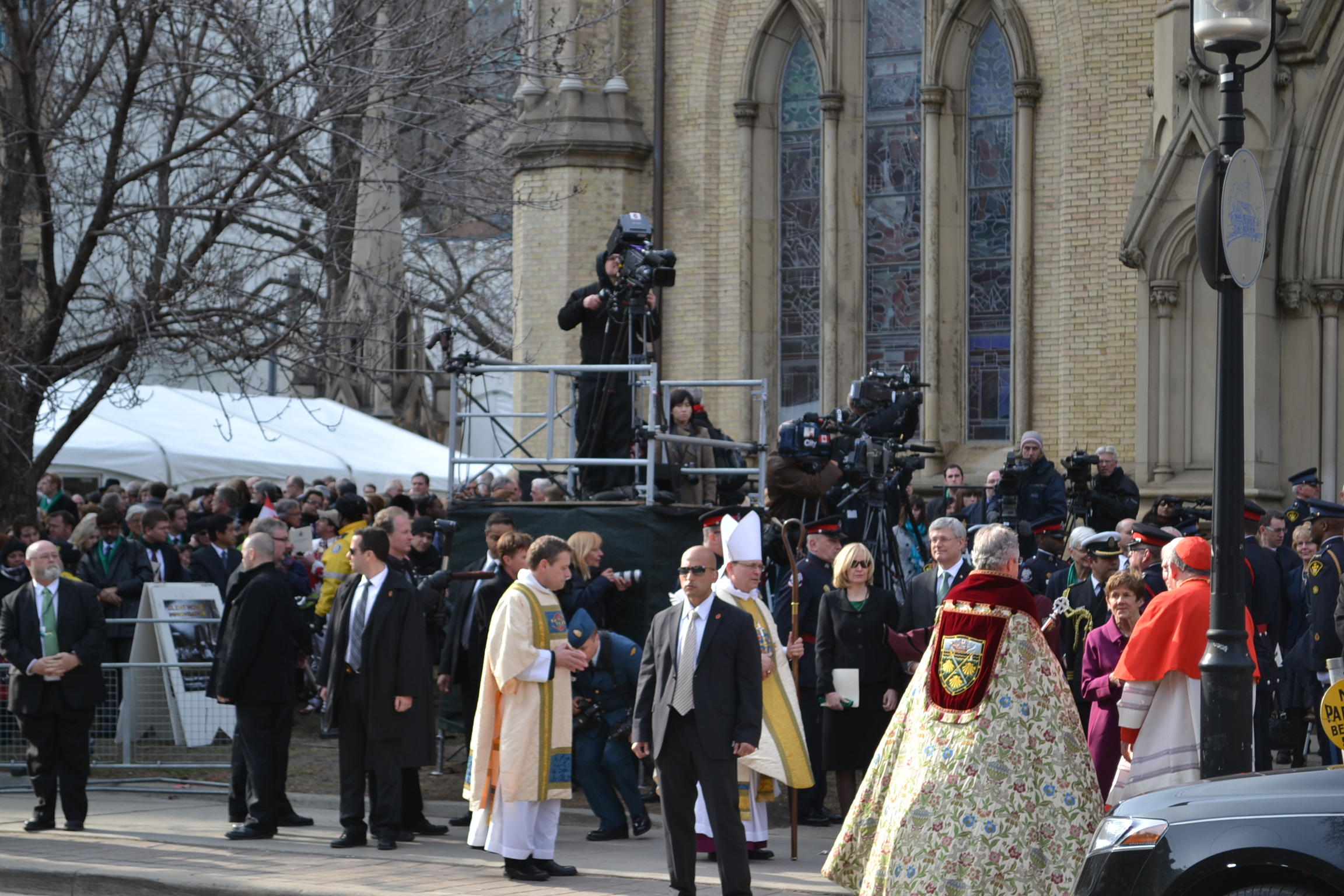
Media overlooking a crowd fronting the Cathedral Church of St. James in Toronto during Flaherty's state funeral on April 16, 2014

Flaherty grew up in a Catholic family in Montreal, and was of part Irish descent. As a youth he was an avid hockey player and won a hockey scholarship to Princeton University.

Those familiar with Flaherty's work as a lawyer noted his dogged determination and a strong work ethic. One colleague, Hamilton lawyer John Soule said, "He is a driven person ... and certainly is prepared to do what is necessary in terms of time and hard work to achieve what he believes is right". He assisted in several volunteer causes, including being the president of the Head Injury Association of Durham Region in Ontario.

His wife, Christine Elliott, was the Progressive Conservative Member of Provincial Parliament for Oshawa–Whitby, east of Toronto and Deputy Leader of the Opposition until her resignation in August 2015. The couple lived in Whitby and have triplet sons John, Galen and Quinn, who were born in 1991. His son Galen, used to work for Doug Ford who was then a member of Toronto City Council. Elliott and Flaherty have both championed issues surrounding children with disabilities; their son, John, has a disability.

In his final years, Flaherty underwent a marked change in his physical appearance including significant weight gain. In January 2013, Flaherty announced he had bullous pemphigoid. He was treated with prednisone, a powerful steroid for which side effects such as those suffered by Flaherty are well-documented. Flaherty died on April 10, 2014, at his home in Ottawa after suffering a heart attack at the age of 64.

A state funeral was held for Flaherty on April 16, 2014, at St. James Cathedral in Toronto.

Harris ministry, Province of Ontario (1995–2002)
Cabinet posts (4)
Predecessor	Office	Successor
Elizabeth Witmer	Minister of Labour; 1997–1999	Chris Stockwell
Charles Harnick	Attorney General; 1999–2001	David Young
Ernie Eves	Deputy Premier of Ontario; 2001–2002	Elizabeth Witmer
Ernie Eves	Minister of Finance; 2001–2002	Janet Ecker
Special Cabinet Responsibilities
Predecessor	Title	Successor
Charles Harnick	Minister of Aboriginal Affairs; 1999–2001	David Young
Eves ministry, Province of Ontario (2002–2003)
Cabinet post (1)
Predecessor	Office	Successor
Position established	Minister of Enterprise, Opportunity and Innovation; 2002–2003	Position abolished
28th Canadian Ministry (2006–2015) – Cabinet of Stephen Harper
Cabinet post (1)
Predecessor	Office	Successor
Ralph Goodale	Minister of Finance; 2006–2014	Joe Oliver
