= Bibliography of Stephen Harper =

Bibliography of the 22nd Canadian Prime Minister

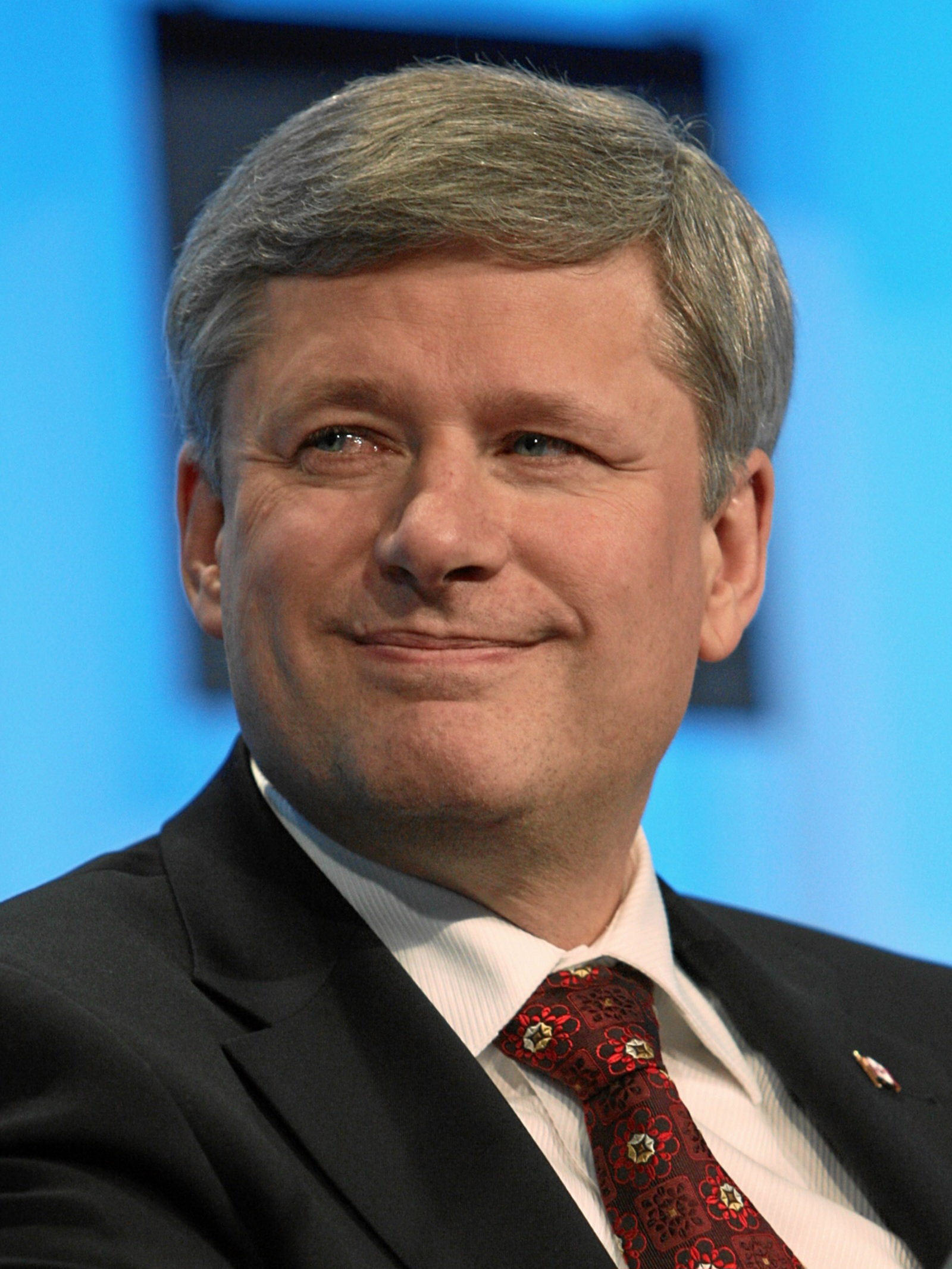
Harper in 2010

Stephen Harper (born 30 April 1959) is a Canadian politician who served as the 22nd prime minister of Canada from 2006 to 2015. He released his first non-fiction book in 2013, titled A Great Game: The Forgotten Leafs and the Rise of Professional Hockey, which concerns the history of professional ice hockey in Canada.

Harper's second non-fiction book, Right Here, Right Now: Politics and Leadership in the Age of Disruption, was released in 2018. The book was a political work, drawing on his experience as prime minister. He released his third book, Flags of Canada, in 2025. The book discusses the history of the various flags used by Canada throughout the country's history.

Harper has also been the subject of an extensive body of literature. This bibliography compiles written and published works exploring Harper's political career and policies, limited to non-fiction books specifically discussing Harper and his time as prime minister from notable authors and publishers. Tertiary sources, satire, and self-published literature are excluded.

== Books by Harper ==
List of written and published works by Stephen Harper
Book title	Year	Publisher	Identifiers	Notes
A Great Game: The Forgotten Leafs and the Rise of Professional Hockey	2013	Simon & Schuster	ISBN 978-1-4767-1653-4; OCLC 857979705	
Right Here, Right Now: Politics and Leadership in the Age of Disruption	2018	McClelland & Stewart	ISBN 978-0-7710-3862-4; OCLC 1039413914	
Flags of Canada	2025	Sutherland House Books	ISBN 978-1-9983-6549-4; OCLC 1475304553	

== Books about Harper ==
List of written and published works about Stephen Harper
Author(s)	Book title	Year	Publisher	Identifiers	Notes
Lloyd Mackey	The Pilgrimage of Stephen Harper	2005	ECW Press	ISBN 978-1-5502-2713-0; OCLC 61127976	(Note: Also printed under the title Stephen Harper: The Case for Collaborative Governance in 2006. ISBN 978-1-5502-2752-9 OCLC 70507202)
William Johnson	Stephen Harper and the Future of Canada	2006	McClelland & Stewart	ISBN 978-0-7710-9554-2; OCLC 76941860	
Paul Wells	Right Side Up: The Fall of Paul Martin and the Rise of Stephen Harper's New Conservatism	2006	McClelland & Stewart	ISBN 978-0-7710-8919-0; OCLC 190964917	
Chantal Hébert	French Kiss: Stephen Harper's Blind Date with Quebec	2007	Knopf Canada	ISBN 978-0-6769-7907-7; OCLC 190965478	
Teresa Healy	The Harper Record	2008	Canadian Centre for Policy Alternatives	ISBN 978-1-8975-6906-1; OCLC 930141740	
Tom Flanagan	Harper's Team: Behind the Scenes in the Conservative Rise to Power	2009	McGill–Queen's University Press	ISBN 978-0-7735-3298-4; OCLC 132302729	
Garth Turner	Sheeple: Caucus Confidential in Stephen Harper's Ottawa	2009	Key Porter Books	ISBN 978-1-5547-0179-7; OCLC 267124275	
John Ibbitson	Open and Shut: Why America Has Barack Obama, and Canada Has Stephen Harper	2009	McClelland & Stewart	ISBN 978-0-7710-4318-5; OCLC 312883436	
Barry Cooper	It's the Regime, Stupid!: A Report from the Cowboy West on Why Stephen Harper Matters	2009	Key Porter Books	ISBN 978-1-5547-0156-8; OCLC 272544436	
Lawrence Martin	Harperland: The Politics of Control	2010	Viking Press	ISBN 978-0-6700-6517-2; OCLC 756899942	
Paula Mallea	Fearmonger: Stephen Harper's Tough-on-Crime Agenda	2011	James Lorimer & Company	ISBN 978-1-5527-7898-2; OCLC 732948976	
Hugh Segal	The Right Balance: Canada's Conservative Tradition	2011	Douglas & McIntyre	ISBN 978-1-5536-5549-7; OCLC 696908633	
Christian Nadeau	Rogue in Power: Why Stephen Harper is Remaking Canada by Stealth	2011	James Lorimer & Company	ISBN 978-1-5527-7730-5; OCLC 697934372	
Paul Wells	Power Trap: How fear and loathing between New Democrats and Liberals keep Stephen Harper in power—and what can be done about it	2012	James Lorimer & Company	ISBN 978-1-4594-0270-6; OCLC 798415610	
Yves Engler	The Ugly Canadian: Stephen Harper's Foreign Policy	2012	Fernwood Publishing	ISBN 978-1-5526-6530-5; OCLC 795624484	
Chris Turner	The War on Science: Muzzled Scientists and Wilful Blindness in Stephen Harper's Canada	2013	Greystone Books	ISBN 978-1-7710-0431-2; OCLC 859237277	
G. Bruce Doern, Christopher Stoney (eds.)	How Ottawa Spends, 2013–2014: The Harper Government: Mid-Term Blues and Long-Term Plans	2013	McGill–Queen's University Press	ISBN 978-0-7735-4271-6; OCLC 864383204	
Donald Gutstein	Harperism: How Stephen Harper and his think tank colleagues have transformed Canada	2014	James Lorimer & Company	ISBN 978-1-4594-0663-6; OCLC 881860018	
Paul Wells	The Longer I'm Prime Minister: Stephen Harper and Canada, 2006–	2014	Random House Canada	ISBN 978-0-3073-6133-2; OCLC 833553259	
Bruce Carson	14 Days: Making the Conservative Movement in Canada	2014	McGill–Queen's University Press	ISBN 978-0-7735-4351-5; OCLC 864505104	
Michael Harris	Party of One: Stephen Harper And Canada's Radical Makeover	2014	Penguin Canada	ISBN 978-0-1431-8705-9; OCLC 902919422	
Brooke Jeffrey	Dismantling Canada: Stephen Harper's New Conservative Agenda	2015	McGill–Queen's University Press	ISBN 978-0-7735-4481-9; OCLC 895338359	
Mark Bourrie	Kill The Messengers: Stephen Harper's Assault on Your Right to Know	2015	HarperCollins	ISBN 978-1-4434-3104-0; OCLC 894750860	
John Ibbitson	Stephen Harper	2015	McClelland & Stewart	ISBN 978-0-7710-4709-1; OCLC 936978766	(Note: Also printed in French as Stephen Harper: un portrait. Translated by Marie-Josée Chrétien and Serge Rivest. ISBN 978-2-7619-4510-3 OCLC 929408553) (Note: Also released as a CD audiobook. ISBN 978-0-6168-4916-3 OCLC 946065760)
Ed Finn (ed.), Ralph Nader (Intro.)	Canada after Harper: His ideology-fuelled attack on Canadian society and values, and how we can now work to create the country we want	2015	James Lorimer & Company	ISBN 978-1-4594-0943-9; OCLC 913176145	
Teresa Healy, Stuart Trew (eds.)	The Harper Record 2008–2015	2015	Canadian Centre for Policy Alternatives	ISBN 978-1-7712-5239-3; OCLC 932343856	(Note: Followup to The Harper Record (2008))
Graham William Fox, Jennifer Ditchburn	The Harper Factor: Assessing a Prime Minister's Policy Legacy	2016	McGill–Queen's University Press	ISBN 978-0-7735-4870-1; OCLC 953887694	
Christopher John Kukucha, Adam Chapnick, and Denis Stairs	The Harper Era in Canadian Foreign Policy: Parliament, Politics, and Canada's Global Posture	2016	UBC Press	ISBN 978-0-7748-3319-6; OCLC 948562543	
Mike Blanchfield	Swingback: Getting Along in the World with Harper and Trudeau	2017	McGill–Queen's University Press	ISBN 978-0-7735-4875-6; OCLC 958486048	
James Harold Farney, Julie M. Simmons (eds.)	Open Federalism Revisited: Regional and Federal Dynamics in the Harper Era	2021	University of Toronto Press	ISBN 978-1-4875-0959-0; OCLC 1223011893	
Peter McKenna (ed.)	Harper's World: The Politicization of Canadian Foreign Policy, 2006–2015	2022	University of Toronto Press	ISBN 978-1-4875-0210-2; OCLC 1242464898	

== See also ==
- List of books about prime ministers of Canada
- Bibliography of Canada
