= Bruce Carson (disambiguation) =

Bruce Carson is the name of:

- Bruce Carson, a former adviser to Canadian Prime Minister Stephen Harper
- Bruce Carson, a minor character in the sixth season of 24
- Bruce Carson (screenwriter) of Slumber Party Massacre III
- Bruce Carson, character played by Gary Tomlin
