= French Kiss: Stephen Harper's Blind Date with Quebec =

2007 book by Chantal Hébert

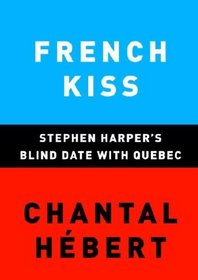
- First edition cover of Canadian release
- Author: Chantal Hébert
- Language: English
- Subject: Politics of Quebec
- Publisher: Knopf Canada
- Publication date: April 2007
- Publication place: Canada
- Media type: Print (hardcover and paperback)
- Pages: 256
- ISBN: 978-0-676-97907-7

French Kiss: Stephen Harper's Blind Date with Quebec is a non-fiction book written by Chantal Hébert, a Canadian writer and columnist for the Toronto Star and Le Devoir, first published by Knopf Canada in April 2007. In the book, the author recounts the 2006 general election in the province of Quebec and the surprisingly strong performance of the Conservative Party in that region. Hébert describes the outcome as a "combination of Harper's tactical brilliance and Paul Martin's political ineptitude." The book presents complex issues in "clear and concise" prose. A review in Quill & Quire credited Hébert with consistent objectivity in her reportage.

== Awards and honours ==
French Kiss received shortlist recognition for the 2008 Edna Staebler Award for Creative Non-Fiction.

== See also ==
- Bibliography of Stephen Harper
