= Flags of Canada (book) =

2025 non-fiction book by Stephen Harper

- Author: Stephen J. Harper
- Illustrator: Greg Stoicoiu
- Language: English
- Subject: Flag of Canada
- Genre: History (vexillology)
- Published: 25 February 2025 (Sutherland House Books)
- Publication place: Canada
- Media type: Print (hardcover)
- Pages: 136pp
- ISBN: 978-1-9983-6549-4
- OCLC: 1475304826

Flags of Canada is a 2025 non-fiction book by Stephen Harper concerning the history of the Canadian flag and other historical flags of Canada. The book is published by Sutherland House Books, and contains accompanying illustrations by Greg Stoicoiu, who is also legally blind.

== Synopsis ==
Harper acquired his interest in the study of flags, known as vexillology, from his father. He began writing his book Flags of Canada prior to the COVID-19 lockdown in 2020. In the book, Harper chronicles the history and timeline of the various flags of the French colonial territory of New France and the British colonial territory of British North America, further detailing the history of the debate surrounding the design of the Canadian flag which eventually culminated in the adoption of the current maple leaf design. Flags of Canada also discusses other historical Canadian flags, such as the flag of the Hudson's Bay Company, the flag of the North West Company, the Newfoundland Tricolour, and the Newfoundland Red Ensign. Harper argues in the book that the Canadian Red Ensign, rather than the Union Jack, should have been designated as the secondary flag of Canada. He concludes the book by considering the likelihood of future changes to the Canadian flag, determining it to be unlikely.

== Publication ==
Flags of Canada was released on 25 February 2025 by Sutherland House Books, together with the Royal Canadian Geographical Society for the 60th anniversary of the Canadian flag. The book is illustrated by Greg Stoicoiu.

== Reception ==
John Ibbitson of The Globe and Mail described Flags of Canada as "devoid of flag-waving" and "not a celebration of the Maple Leaf". Ibbitson further characterized the book as "stick[ing] to the facts", stating that Harper eschews glorifying or denouncing any of the flags discussed in the book but rather presents the information in a factual way. Forrest Pass of the Literary Review of Canada described Flags of Canada as "a brief but interesting read, enhanced by Greg Stoicoiu's engaging illustrations of historical standards."

== See also ==
- Bibliography of Stephen Harper
- List of Canadian flags
