= A Great Game =

2013 non-fiction book by Stephen Harper

A Great Game: The Forgotten Leafs and the Rise of Professional Hockey
- Author: Stephen J. Harper
- Language: English
- Subject: Ice hockey
- Published: 2013 (Simon & Schuster)
- Publication place: Canada
- Media type: Print (hardcover)
- Pages: 320pp
- ISBN: 978-1476716534
- OCLC: 857979705

A Great Game: The Forgotten Leafs and the Rise of Professional Hockey is a 2013 non-fiction book by Stephen Harper concerning the history of professional ice hockey in Canada during the early 20th century.

== Synopsis ==
The book follows the development of Toronto's earliest professional hockey teams, particularly the Toronto Professional Hockey Club (1906–09) and the Toronto Blueshirts (from 1911). Prior to this, the development of professional teams was fiercely opposed by the Ontario Hockey Association and by Toronto Telegram publisher John Ross Robertson.

== Publication ==
Harper wrote the book over an eight-year period. It was released on 5 November 2013 by Simon & Schuster. Proceeds from the book's sales support the Canadian Forces Personnel and Family Support Services. The book also covers other aspects of the early-century game such as the development of artificial ice rinks. During the research and writing process of the book Harper was assisted by author Roy MacGregor.

== Reception ==
Perry Lefko's negative review in Quill & Quire deemed that the book "reads like a long-winded essay or thesis from a hockey historian". Globe and Mail reviewer John Allemang noted that "[v]erbal amateurism apart, it's enjoyable to catch traces of a more boyish, playful Stephen Harper". The Toronto Star review of the book also noted the academic style of the book but indicated the presentation of early 20th-century hockey provided a "historical perspective that has received scant attention among all the books devoted to hockey".

== See also ==
- Bibliography of Stephen Harper
