= Right Here, Right Now (book) =

2018 non-fiction book by Stephen Harper

Right Here, Right Now: Politics and Leadership in the Age of Disruption
- Author: Stephen J. Harper
- Language: English
- Subject: Politics
- Published: 2018 (Signal/Penguin Random House)
- Publication place: Canada
- Media type: Print (hardcover)
- Pages: 240
- ISBN: 978-0771038624
- OCLC: 1039413914

Right Here, Right Now: Politics and Leadership in the Age of Disruption is a 2018 non-fiction book by Stephen Harper. It draws on his decade of experience as prime minister of Canada intended to "help leaders in business and government understand, adapt, and thrive in an age of unprecedented disruption."

== Publication ==
Right Here, Right Now was released on 9 October 2018 by the Signal Books imprint of Penguin Random House Canada.

== Reception ==
Postmedia columnist Andrew Coyne panned the book, positing various flaws in Harper's portrayal of populism and economics. Toronto Sun columnist Anthony Furey's positive review declared Right Here, Right Now to be the "must-read political book of the year".

== See also ==
- Bibliography of Stephen Harper
