= Canada Investment Summit =

2026 Canadian business meeting

- Host country: Canada
- Date: September 14–15, 2026
- City: Toronto
- Venue: Four Seasons Hotel Toronto

The Canada Investment Summit (French: Sommet canadien de l’investissement) was a meeting hosted by the Government of Canada focused on attracting foreign investment into the country. Numerous investors, business executives and leaders were invited. In a pitchbook from the government, 167 projects were listed as possible investments. Around 100 investors were expected to attend, managing a total of $120 trillion.

On April 17, 2026, Prime Minister Mark Carney announced that the summit would occur in Toronto from September 14–15, 2026. It was organized by the Office of the Prime Minister, CPP Investments and the Public Sector Pension Investment Board.

In July, Bloomberg reported that Jonathan D. Gray, Larry Fink, and C. S. Venkatakrishnan were invited. Other Canadian politicians, including Saskatchewan Premier Scott Moe and Nova Scotia Premier Tim Houston attended the summit, with Moe and Carney making an announcement on data sovereignty during the event. The event included closed-door meetings between Carney and global financial executives.

The summit began with a gala at the Art Gallery of Ontario on September 14, opened by a speech delivered by Carney. On September 15, Carney delivered the summit's keynote address, and made announcements including a new federal "mega-deduction" tax incentive and the opening of private investment across Toronto Pearson International Airport, Montréal–Trudeau International Airport, Vancouver International Airport, and Calgary International Airport. The summit concluded with an address by former Prime Minister Stephen Harper, with the PMO announcing that the event had "unleashed" nearly $500 billion in investment in Canada.
