= Bruce Carson =

Canadian lawyer and fraudster

- Born: December 15, 1945; Ottawa, Canada
- Died: March 5, 2022 (aged 76); Ottawa, Canada
- Known for: Fraud allegations
- Political party: Conservative Party of Canada (former advisor)
- Criminal charge: Fraud

Bruce Carson (December 15, 1945 – March 5, 2022) was an aide and senior advisor to the Prime Minister of Canada, Stephen Harper. He was convicted of two counts of fraud, one was during the 1980s and again in 1990. His 1980 conviction resulted in prison time and his disbarment by the Law Society of Upper Canada for two counts of defrauding clients. Carson later became a contributor to numerous national publications, and a regular contributor to right-wing news aggregate, News Hub Nation, headed by former Conservative Cabinet Minister, Monte Solberg.

On July 27, 2012, Carson was charged with influence peddling by the Royal Canadian Mounted Police. He was eventually convicted of influence peddling by the Ontario Court of Appeal on October 6, 2016. In May 2014, Carson was further charged with three counts of prohibited lobbying and a single count of influence peddling. He was due in court to face these charges on June 18, 2014, in Ottawa. In November, 2016, an Ontario court found him guilty of the lobbying charges and imposed a $50,000 fine.

On March 5, 2022, Carson died of cancer in Ottawa.

== 1978–1993 ==
Since his early 30s, Carson had numerous legal difficulties related to financial improprieties, most of which involved fraud or non-payment of obligations.

In 1978, Carson was ordered by a court judgement to pay a company over $1,900, stemming from a bounced cheque.

In May 1979, Carson and his then-wife defaulted on their mortgage payments. This resulted in a Supreme Court of Ontario writ allowing possession of their property to be claimed by a savings and loan company. During that time, he was also sued by for $1,189.50 by the Hudson's Bay Company for unpaid merchandise.

Early in the 1980s, he was disbarred by the Law Society of Upper Canada and sentenced to a jail term for defrauding clients on two occasions. In 1981, the disbarment finding summary stated that his "fiscal position had deteriorated due to a land development project in which he had become involved and due to an extravagant lifestyle."

In 1980, Carson faced a court order to pay $3,000 plus interest for non-payment of funds on the lease of a Lincoln Continental.

From 1984 to 1990, during John Turner's incumbency, the Liberal caucus research bureau pays Carson for freelance work.

In 1990, while employment doing research for the Library of Parliament, Carson was charged with fraud involving Budget Car and Truck Rental and a 1989 Toyota. Also during that year, he was charged with both the Bank of Montreal and the Toronto-Dominion Bank, each for amounts greater than $1,000. In June of that year, he pleaded guilty to all three counts, and received a suspended sentence with 24 months probation, provided that he "continue treatment at the R.O.H. (Royal Ottawa Hospital)," and pay $4,000 in restitution to Budget Car and Truck Rental within 23 months.

Later in the 1990s, Carson worked for the Progressive Conservative research service at the Ontario legislature, and for Conservative senators on Parliament Hill.

Carson was declared a bankrupt in 1993 with a debt of over $103,000. In 2002, he had $369,000 in "liabilities" and agreed to what is termed a "proposal", a mitigating measure, an option to avoid bankruptcy which allows one to arrange to pay one's debts.

== Position as senior advisor to the Prime Minister, Stephen Harper ==
On February 6, 2006, he began employment with the Prime Minister's Office as an aide and senior advisor. Harper has stated that he did not know of Carson's convictions in the 1980s or the fact that he had received court-ordered psychiatric treatment. Carson left the Prime Minister's office in 2008.

== Employment at the Canada School of Energy and Environment ==
After leaving the Prime Minister's office in 2008, he began employment as executive director of the Canada School of Energy and Environment on August 14, 2008. The institution was set up by the University of Calgary, the University of Alberta and the University of Lethbridge. It is funded by a grant from the Canadian federal government. The organization coordinates clean energy research. He returned to the Prime Minister's office for a short time in January 2009, then later that year, returned to the Canada School of Energy and Environment. During his employment there, Carson accrued personal expenses, which the organization had to pay after his departure.

== Lobbying allegations ==
Carson was allegedly lobbying on behalf of H2O Pros, an Ottawa-based water company that had a financial connection to his fiancée. Carson is alleged to have been helping secure a contract involving the sale of water filtration systems to the Indian Affairs Department to First Nations in need of clean drinking water. Carson was never registered as a lobbyist, and as a former political staff member, was prohibited from lobbying government agencies for five years after leaving office. On March 25, 2011, head of H2O Global Group, Patrick Hill, denied that Carson had lobbied on his behalf.

On February 6, 2009, during leave from his position as head of the Canada School of Energy and Environment, the Deputy Minister of Natural Resources Cassie Doyle received an email from Carson's account, lobbying for a $25 million grant on behalf of the organization. Carson stated later that the email was drafted before he returned to the Prime Minister's office, and that it had been sent accidentally.

Carson was present at the signing of the contract, witnessing and initialing it. The contract guaranteed 20 percent of the gross profits go to Michele McPherson. McPherson is 22 years old. His fiancée, an alleged former escort, is alleged to have acted as an intermediary.

=== Letters expressing concern ===
In April 2011, Conservative Party officials released two letters that were sent by Stephen Harper's former chief of staff Guy Giorno two years earlier in January 2009 to the federal conflict of interest and ethics commissioner. The letters indicate that Carson, while working at the Prime Minister's office in 2009, may have been engaged in lobbying to secure a $25 million grant for the School of Energy and Environment. Carbon Management Canada eventually received the grant, an organization with which Carson is also affiliated. The letters also reveal that some of the senior staff members were concerned enough to alert the federal conflict of interest and ethics commissioners.

Then Deputy Minister of the Environment Ian Shugart sent a third letter to the federal conflict of interest and ethics commissioner. However, Prime Minister Harper stated that before the 2010 claims that influenced peddling allegations, his senior staff had no prior knowledge of any controversial activity by Carson. Harper stated: "The fact is, I did not know about these revelations that we're finding out today. I don't know why I did not know."

== 2012 influence peddling charges ==
On July 27, 2012, Carson was charged with influence peddling by the Royal Canadian Mounted Police's "A" Division Commercial Crime Section. The charge is formally known under the Criminal Code (Section 121(1)(d)) as "Fraud on the Government".

The RCMP started the investigation in March 2011, after Prime Minister's office provided a referral. prompted by the publication of an APTN National News story that investigating and revealing that in 2010

The single count of influence peddling is a result of Carson's alleged acceptance of commission for a third party connected to a business transaction related to the Canadian Government.

The Prime Minister's office also asked that the Ethics Commission and Lobbying Commission both investigate Carson. Neither commission has yet to release the result of their probes.

Carson was scheduled to appear at the Ontario Court of Justice in Ottawa on September 10, 2012. His lawyer, Pat McCann, stated that Carson is not in custody, but has been summoned to surrender himself when he appears in court.

On October 1, 2012, Carson appeared briefly in court in Ottawa to schedule dates for two future appearances. The first will be a closed-door, judicial pre-trial between party lawyers and a judge on October 17. The second will be an appearance in remand court on October 22. Patrick McCann, Carson's lawyer, declined comment while leaving the court.

In May 2014, the RCMP laid a further four charges against Carson resulting from his lobbying for the Canada School of Energy and Environment and the Energy Policy Institute of Canada. The new charges are three counts of prohibited lobbying and a single count of influence peddling.

Carson was initially acquitted on the charge of fraud on the Government on November 17, 2015. However, the Ontario Court of Appeal overturned the acquittal and entered in a verdict of guilty in a 2-1 decision on October 6, 2016. The guilty verdict was affirmed by the Supreme Court of Canada in an 8–1 decision.

Carson was convicted of three counts for violations of the Lobbying Act on September 16, 2016. On appeal, the conviction on one the counts was overturned while the other two were affirmed. Carson was fined $45,000 for the violations.
