= Chantal Hébert =

Canadian journalist and political commentator (born 1954)

Chantal Hébert OC CQ
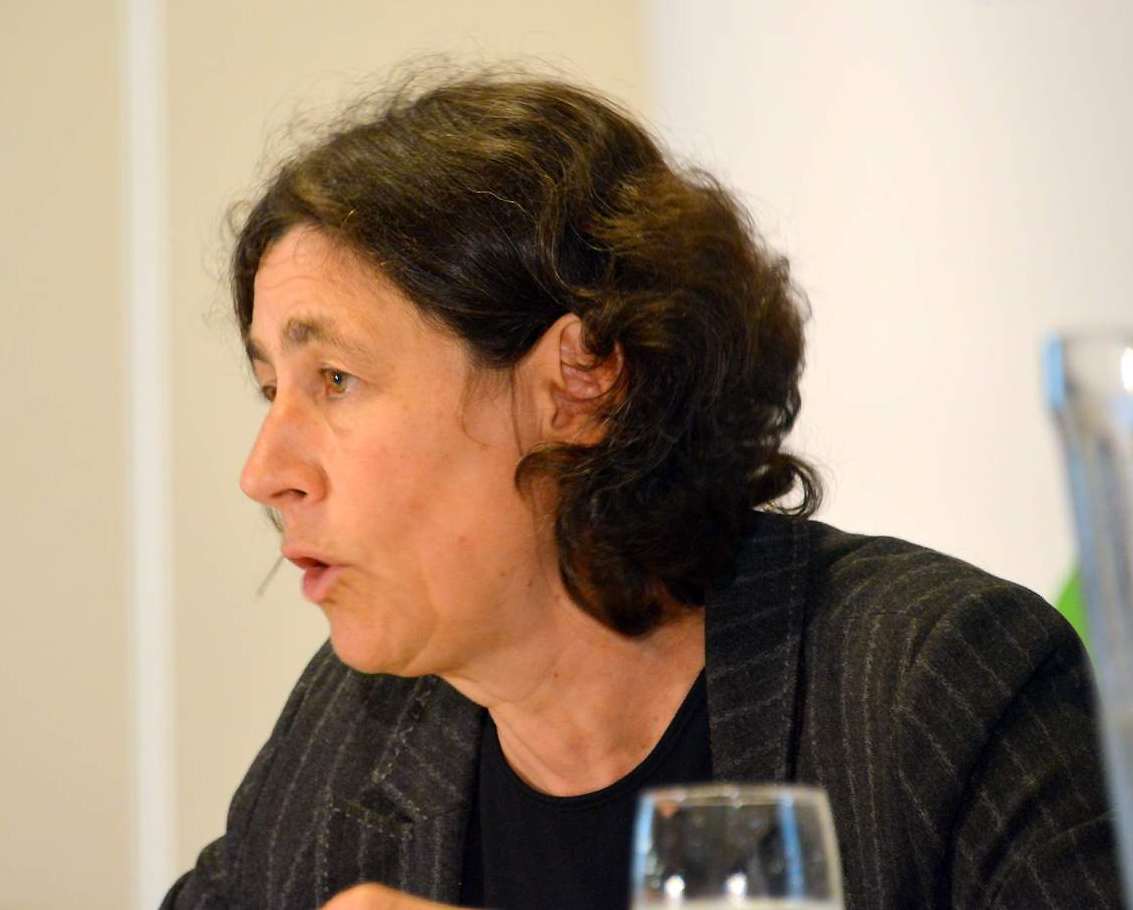
- Hébert in 2013
- Born: Chantal St-Cyr; April 24, 1954 (age 72); Ottawa, Ontario, Canada
- Other name: Chantal St-Cyr Hébert
- Education: Glendon College, York
- Occupations: Writer; journalist; political commentator
- Notable work: French Kiss (2007)

Chantal St-Cyr Hébert OC CQ (born April 24, 1954) is a Canadian journalist and political commentator.

== Life and career ==
Hébert was born on April 24, 1954, in Ottawa, Ontario, the oldest of five children of Micheline (Forest) and journalist Jean-Raymond St-Cyr. In 1966, her family moved to Toronto; while in the city, the then-12-year-old was enrolled in École secondaire catholique Monseigneur-de-Charbonnel. She then attended Toronto's first public francophone high school, École secondaire Étienne-Brûlé. After high school, Hébert obtained a Bachelor of Arts degree in 1976 in political science from the bilingual Glendon College of York University. She is a Senior Fellow of Massey College at the University of Toronto.

Hébert began her media career in 1975 at the regional television and radio newsroom of the French-language Radio-Canada facility in Toronto. She eventually became their reporter covering provincial politics at Queen's Park. After Radio-Canada appointed Hébert to cover federal politics on Parliament Hill, she worked as bureau chief for Montreal's Le Devoir and La Presse. She has written columns appearing in The London Free Press, the Ottawa Citizen, the National Post, and Metro, and currently in Le Devoir and the Toronto Star.

Hébert has two sons.

=== The "Lobster Pot" story ===
In the summer of 1995, Hébert broke the story in La Presse that the 1995 Quebec referendum question's guarantee of an offer of partnership with the rest of Canada before declaring sovereignty following a "Yes" vote was a sham. Hébert wrote that in a June 13 meeting with fifteen foreign diplomats, Quebec Premier Jacques Parizeau stated that what mattered was to get a majority vote from Quebec citizens for the proposal to secede from Canada because with that, Quebecers would be trapped "like lobsters thrown in boiling water" (in French: "comme des homards dans l'eau bouillante").

At the time, Parizeau was in France. In his place Quebec's deputy premier, Bernard Landry, who was not present at the meeting, declared categorically that the report was false. However, Hébert reported that the information was in fact given to Foreign Affairs Canada in an official briefing by the Ambassador from the Netherlands (Jan Fietelaars). She reinforced this with confirmation from Ambassador Christian Fellens of Belgium, who was present at the meeting, and two other attendees who spoke off the record. The story hampered support for the "Yes" side.

=== Pundit and author ===
Currently, Hébert is a national affairs writer with the Toronto Star as well as a guest columnist for Le Devoir and L'actualite. She appears frequently on CBC Television's The National as a member of the At Issue political panel hosted by Rosemary Barton alongside fellow panelists Andrew Coyne and Althia Raj. Hébert is also a regular participant in various other French and English-language television and radio current affairs programs.

Hébert received the 2005 Public Service Citation of the Association of Professional Executives of the Public Service of Canada (APEX). In February 2006, the Public Policy Forum voted her the Hyman Solomon Award for Excellence in Public Policy Journalism. She delivered the Michener Lecture at Queen's University in 2008.

In June 2006, Hébert took two months' leave of absence from the Toronto Star to write her first book, French Kiss: Stephen Harper's Blind Date with Quebec (Knopf Canada, February 2007, ISBN 978-0-676-97907-7). French Kiss received shortlist honours for the 2008 Edna Staebler Award for Creative Non-Fiction.

In September 2014, her second book was released, The Morning After: The 1995 Quebec Referendum and the Day that Almost Was (in French, Confessions post-référendaires: Les acteurs politiques de 1995 et le scénario d'un oui). The book, cowritten with Jean Lapierre, was shortlisted for the 2015 Shaughnessy Cohen Prize for Political Writing.

== Honours and awards ==
She was invested as an Officer of the Order of Canada on November 23, 2012.

Honorary degrees

| Location | Date | School | Degree | Gave Commencement Address |
|---|---|---|---|---|
| Quebec | May 2009 | Bishop's University | Doctor of Civil Law (DCL) | Yes |
| Ontario | June 6, 2012 | York University | Doctor of Laws (LL.D) | Yes |
| Ontario | June 19, 2013 | University of Western Ontario | Doctor of Laws (LL.D) | Yes |
| Quebec | June 2014 | Concordia University | Doctor of Laws (LL.D) | Yes |
| Manitoba | October 22, 2014 | University of Manitoba | Doctor of Science (D.Sc.) | Yes |
| Nova Scotia | May 14, 2015 | Mount Saint Vincent University | Doctor of Humane Letters (DHL) | Yes |
| Ontario | June 5, 2015 | Loyalist College | Honorary Diploma | Yes |
| Ontario | October 2015 | Wilfrid Laurier University | Doctor of Letters (D.Litt.) | Yes |
| British Columbia | Spring 2016 | University of British Columbia | Doctor of Laws (LL.D) | Yes |
| Nova Scotia | Spring 2017 | Dalhousie University | Doctor of Laws (LL.D) | Yes |
| Ontario | June 15, 2021 | Carleton University | Doctor of Laws (LL.D) | Yes |

Honorary Degree University of Alberta- Spring 2015, Gave Commencement Address
