= Stephen Harper =

Prime Minister of Canada from 2006 to 2015

The Right Honourable Stephen Harper PC CC AOE
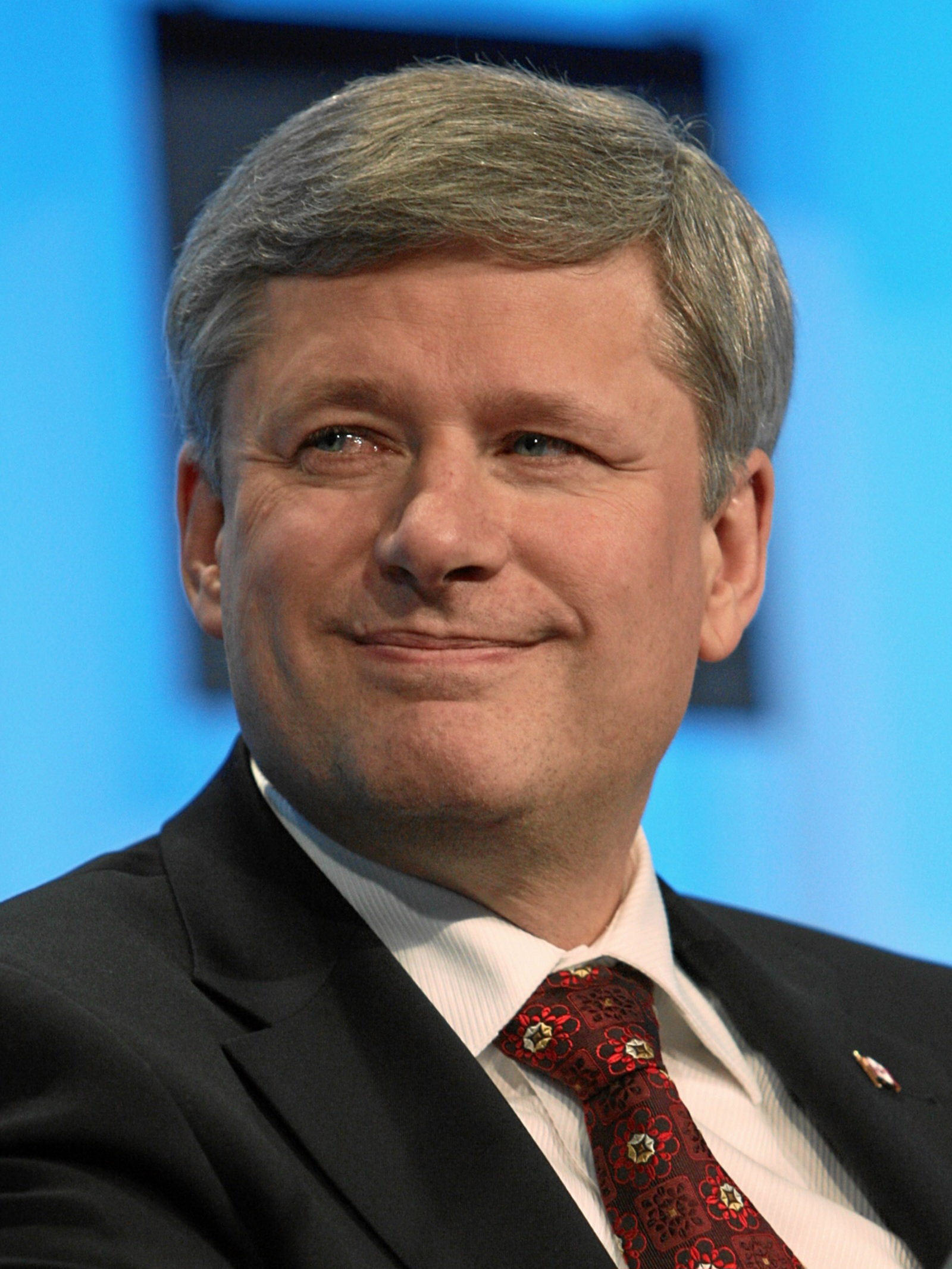
- Harper in 2010

22nd Prime Minister of Canada
- In office February 6, 2006 – November 4, 2015
- Monarch: Elizabeth II
- Governors General: Michaëlle Jean; David Johnston
- Preceded by: Paul Martin
- Succeeded by: Justin Trudeau

8th Chairman of the International Democracy Union (Note: International Democrat Union until 2023.)
- Incumbent
- Assumed office February 21, 2018
- Deputy: Tony Clement; Brian Loughnane
- Preceded by: John Key

Chair of the AIMCo
- Incumbent
- Assumed office November 20, 2024
- Premier: Danielle Smith
- Preceded by: Kenneth Kroner
Additional offices held
Leader of the Opposition
In office March 20, 2004 – February 6, 2006
Preceded by	Grant Hill
Succeeded by	Bill Graham
In office May 21, 2002 – January 8, 2004
Preceded by	John Reynolds
Succeeded by	Grant Hill
Leader of the Conservative Party
In office March 20, 2004 – November 4, 2015
Deputy	Peter MacKay
Preceded by	John Lynch-Staunton (interim)
Succeeded by	Andrew Scheer (Note: Rona Ambrose served as interim leader from November 4, 2015 to May 27, 2017.)
Leader of the Canadian Alliance
In office March 20, 2002 – December 7, 2003
Preceded by	Stockwell Day (Note: John Reynolds served as interim leader from December 11, 2001 to March 20, 2002.)
Succeeded by	Position abolished

Member of Parliament
- In office May 13, 2002 – August 26, 2016
- Preceded by: Preston Manning
- Succeeded by: Bob Benzen
- Constituency: Calgary Southwest (2002–2015); Calgary Heritage (2015–2016)
- In office October 25, 1993 – April 26, 1997
- Preceded by: Jim Hawkes
- Succeeded by: Rob Anders
- Constituency: Calgary West

Personal details
- Born: April 30, 1959 (age 67) Leaside, Ontario, Canada
- Party: Conservative (since 2003)
- Other political affiliations: Alliance (2000–2003); Reform (1987–2000)
- Spouse: Laureen Teskey (m. 1993)
- Children: 2
- Education: University of Calgary (BA, MA)
- Website: stephenharper.com
- Stephen Harper's voice Recorded January 26, 2012

Stephen Joseph Harper (born April 30, 1959) is a Canadian politician who served as the 22nd prime minister of Canada from 2006 to 2015. He is the only prime minister to have belonged to the modern Conservative Party of Canada. He co-founded the party and served as its first leader from 2004 to 2015. Since 2018, he has been the chairman of the International Democracy Union.

Born in Leaside, now a neighbourhood of Toronto, Ontario, Harper studied economics, earning his bachelor's and master's degrees in 1985 and 1991, respectively, from the University of Calgary. He was a founder of the Reform Party of Canada and was first elected to the House of Commons in the 1993 federal election in the riding of Calgary West. He did not seek re-election in 1997 and instead joined and later led the National Citizens Coalition, a conservative lobbyist group. In 2002, Harper defeated Stockwell Day to become leader of the Canadian Alliance, the successor to the Reform Party, and returned to Parliament as the leader of the Opposition. In 2003, Harper and Progressive Conservative Party leader Peter MacKay agreed to merge the Canadian Alliance with the Progressive Conservatives to form the Conservative Party of Canada. Harper was elected as the party's first leader in 2004. He led the Conservatives in the 2004 federal election, in which they lost to Paul Martin's Liberal Party. Harper led the Conservatives to a minority government in the 2006 federal election.

During Harper's premiership, he faced the In and Out scandal, reduced the goods and services tax (GST) to 5%, and passed the Federal Accountability Act, the Québécois nation motion, and the Veterans' Bill of Rights. Harper led the Conservatives to a larger minority government in the 2008 federal election, after which he prorogued Parliament to avoid defeat by a proposed coalition of opposition parties, advanced the Economic Action Plan of personal income tax cuts and infrastructure investments in response to the Great Recession, introduced the tax-free savings account, and authorized military intervention during the First Libyan Civil War. In March 2011, Harper's government was found to be in contempt of Parliament in a vote of no confidence, triggering a federal election in which he led the Conservatives to a majority government. He subsequently repealed the long-gun registry, privatized the Canadian Wheat Board, enacted the Anti-terrorism Act, 2015, and reduced Canada's budget deficit from $55.6 billion in 2009 to $2.9 billion in 2015. In foreign policy, Harper withdrew Canada from the Kyoto Protocol, launched Canada's Global Markets Action Plan, negotiated free trade agreements, and authorized Operation Impact against ISIL and Operation Unifier following the Russian annexation of Crimea. Harper's Conservatives also faced controversies in the Robocall scandal and the Canadian Senate expenses scandal, and the Idle No More movement emerged during his premiership.

In the 2015 federal election, the Conservative Party was defeated by the Liberal Party led by Justin Trudeau. Harper officially stepped down as party leader in October 2015 and resigned his seat in August 2016. Since then, he has taken on several international business and leadership roles, including founding a global consulting firm, appearing in U.S. and British media, and being elected as chairman of the International Democracy Union, an international alliance of centre-right to right-wing political parties. Harper was the longest-serving conservative prime minister since John A. Macdonald.

== Early life and education ==
Harper was born and raised in the Town of Leaside, now a neighbourhood of Toronto, Ontario, the first of three sons of Margaret (née Johnston) and Joseph Harris Harper, an accountant at Imperial Oil. The Harper family traces its ancestral roots back to Sledmere, a village in Yorkshire, England, with Harper's 4th great-grandfather Christopher having emigrated to Nova Scotia in 1774, where he later served as justice of the peace in the area that is now New Brunswick.

Harper attended Northlea Public School in Leaside and, later, John G. Althouse Middle School and Richview Collegiate Institute, both in Etobicoke, Toronto. He graduated from high school in 1978 and was a member of Richview Collegiate's team on Reach for the Top, a televised academic quiz show for high school students. Harper first enrolled at Trinity College at the University of Toronto. In an attempt to establish independence from his parents, Harper dropped out of the University of Toronto and then moved to Edmonton, Alberta, where he found work in the mail room at Imperial Oil. Later, he advanced to work on the company's computer systems. He took up post-secondary studies again at the University of Calgary, where he completed a bachelor's degree in economics in 1985. He later returned there to earn a master's degree in economics, completed in 1991. Throughout his career, Harper has kept strong links to the University of Calgary. Trained as an economist, Harper was the first prime minister with an economics degree since Pierre Trudeau and the first prime minister without a law degree since Joe Clark.

== Political beginnings ==
Harper became involved in politics as a member of his high school's Young Liberals club. He later changed his political allegiance because he disagreed with the National Energy Program (NEP) of Pierre Trudeau's Liberal government. He became executive assistant to Progressive Conservative (PC) member of Parliament (MP) Jim Hawkes in 1985 but later became disillusioned with the party and the government of Brian Mulroney, citing the administration's economic policy. He left the PC Party the next year.

Harper was then recommended by the University of Calgary's economist Bob Mansell to Preston Manning, the founder and leader of the right-wing populist Reform Party of Canada. At that time, Harper "didn't see himself as a politician", Mansell told CBC News in 2002, adding, "Politics was not his first love."

Manning invited him to participate in the party, and Harper gave a speech at Reform's 1987 founding convention in Winnipeg. He became the Reform Party's chief policy officer, and he played a major role in drafting the 1988 election platform, otherwise known as the Blue Book, which helped form the principles and policies of the party. Harper was influenced by his political mentor, Tom Flanagan, when writing the book. Harper is credited with creating Reform's campaign slogan, "The West wants in!"

Harper ran for the House of Commons in the 1988 federal election in Calgary West but lost by a wide margin to Hawkes, his former employer. After Reform candidate Deborah Grey was elected as the party's first MP in a 1989 by-election, Harper became Grey's executive assistant, serving as her chief adviser and speechwriter until 1993. He remained prominent in the Reform Party's national organization in his role as policy chief, encouraging the party to expand beyond its Western base and arguing that strictly regional parties were at risk of being taken over by radical elements. He delivered a speech at the Reform Party's 1991 national convention, in which he condemned extremist views.

Harper's relationship with Manning became strained in 1992 because of conflicting strategies over the Charlottetown Accord. Harper opposed the accord on principle for ideological reasons, while Manning was initially more open to compromise. Harper also criticized Manning's decision to hire Rick Anderson as an adviser, believing that Anderson was not sufficiently committed to the Reform Party's principles. Harper resigned as the policy chief in October 1992.

Harper stood for office again in the 1993 federal election and defeated Jim Hawkes amid a significant Reform breakthrough in Western Canada. The National Citizens Coalition (NCC) ran a $50,000 print and television campaign against Hawkes but did not endorse Harper directly.

=== Reform Party MP (1993–1997) ===
Harper emerged as a prominent member of the Reform Party caucus. He was active on constitutional issues and played a prominent role in drafting the Reform Party's strategy for the 1995 Quebec referendum. A long-standing opponent of centralized federalism, he stood with Preston Manning in Montreal to introduce a twenty-point plan to "decentralize and modernize" Canada in the event of a "no" victory. Harper later argued that the "no" side's narrow plurality was a worst-case scenario, in that no one had won a mandate for change.

Harper has expressed some socially conservative views on certain issues. In 1994, he opposed plans by federal Justice Minister Allan Rock to introduce spousal benefits for same-sex couples. Citing the recent failure of a similar initiative in Ontario, he was quoted as saying, "What I hope they learn is not to get into it. There are more important social and economic issues, not to mention the unity question." Harper also spoke against the possibility of the Canadian Human Rights Commission or the Supreme Court changing federal policy in these and other matters.

At the Reform Party's 1994 policy convention, Harper was part of a small minority of delegates who voted against restricting the definition of marriage to "the union of one man and one woman". He opposed both same-sex marriage and mandated benefits for same-sex couples, but argued that political parties should refrain from taking official positions on these and other "issues of conscience".

Harper was the only Reform MP to support the creation of the Canadian Firearms Registry at second reading in 1995, although he later voted against it at third reading stage. He said at the time that he initially voted for the registry because of a poll showing that most of his constituents supported it, and added that he changed his vote when a second poll showed the opposite result. It was reported in April 1995 that some Progressive Conservatives opposed to Jean Charest's leadership wanted to remove both Charest and Manning, and unite the Reform and Progressive Conservative parties under Harper's leadership.

Despite his prominent position in the party, Harper's relationship with the Reform Party leadership was frequently strained. In early 1994, he criticized a party decision to establish a personal expense account for Manning at a time when other Reform MPs had been asked to forego parliamentary perquisites. He was formally rebuked by the Reform executive council despite winning support from some MPs. His relationship with Manning grew increasingly fractious in the mid-1990s, and he pointedly declined to express any opinion on Manning's leadership during a 1996 interview. This friction was indicative of a fundamental divide between the two men: Harper was strongly committed to conservative principles and opposed Manning's inclinations toward populism, which Harper saw as leading to compromise on core ideological matters.

These tensions culminated in late 1996 when Harper announced that he would not be a candidate in the next federal election. He resigned his parliamentary seat on January 14, 1997, the same day that he was appointed as a vice-president of the National Citizens Coalition (NCC), a conservative think-tank and advocacy group. He was promoted to NCC president later in the year.

In April 1997, Harper suggested that the Reform Party was drifting toward social conservatism and ignoring the principles of economic conservatism. The Liberal Party lost seats but managed to retain a narrow majority government in the 1997 federal election, while Reform made only modest gains.

=== Out of parliament (1997–2001) ===
Soon after leaving Parliament, Harper and Tom Flanagan co-authored an opinion piece entitled "Our Benign Dictatorship", which argued that the Liberal Party only retained power through a dysfunctional political system and a divided opposition. Harper and Flanagan argued that federal conservative governments between 1917 and 1993 were founded on temporary alliances between Western populists and Quebec nationalists, and were unable to govern because of their fundamental contradictions. The authors called for an alliance of Canada's conservative parties, and suggested that meaningful political change might require electoral reforms such as proportional representation. "Our Benign Dictatorship" also commended Conrad Black's purchase of the Southam newspaper chain, arguing that his stewardship would provide for a "pluralistic" editorial view to counter the "monolithically liberal and feminist" approach of the previous management.

Harper remained active in constitutional issues. He was a prominent opponent of the Calgary Declaration on national unity in late 1997, describing it as an "appeasement strategy" against Quebec nationalism. He called for federalist politicians to reject this strategy and approach future constitutional talks from the position that "Quebec separatists are the problem and they need to be fixed". In late 1999, Harper called for the federal government to establish clear rules for any future Quebec referendum on sovereignty. Some have identified Harper's views as an influence on the Chrétien government's Clarity Act.

As president of the National Citizens Coalition (NCC) from 1998 to 2002, Harper launched an ultimately unsuccessful legal battle against federal election laws restricting third-party advertising. He led the NCC in several campaigns against the Canadian Wheat Board, and supported Finance Minister Paul Martin's 2000 tax cuts as a positive first step toward tax reform.

In 1997, Harper delivered a controversial speech on Canadian identity to the Council for National Policy, a conservative American think tank. He made comments such as "Canada is a Northern European welfare state in the worst sense of the term, and very proud of it", "if you're like all Americans, you know almost nothing except for your own country. Which makes you probably knowledgeable about one more country than most Canadians", and "the NDP [New Democratic Party] is kind of proof that the Devil lives and interferes in the affairs of men." These statements were made public and criticized during the 2006 election. Harper argued that the speech was intended as humour rather than serious analysis.

Harper considered campaigning for the Progressive Conservative Party leadership in 1998, after Jean Charest left federal politics. Among those encouraging his candidacy were senior aides to Ontario Premier Mike Harris, including Tony Clement and Tom Long. He eventually decided against running, arguing that it would "burn bridges to those Reformers with whom I worked for many years" and prevent an alliance of right-wing parties from taking shape. Harper was sceptical about the Reform Party's United Alternative initiative in 1999, arguing that it would serve to consolidate Manning's hold on the party leadership. He also expressed concern that the UA would dilute Reform's ideological focus.

When the United Alternative created the Canadian Alliance in 2000 as a successor party to Reform, Harper predicted that Stockwell Day would defeat Preston Manning for the new party's leadership. He expressed reservations about Day's abilities, however, and accused Day of "[making] adherence to his social views a litmus test to determine whether you're in the party or not". Harper endorsed Tom Long for the leadership, arguing that Long was best suited to take support from the Progressive Conservative Party. When Day placed first on the first ballot, Harper said that the Canadian Alliance was shifting "more towards being a party of the religious right".

After the death of Pierre Trudeau in 2000, Harper wrote an editorial criticizing Trudeau's policies as they affected Western Canada. He wrote that Trudeau "embraced the fashionable causes of his time, with variable enthusiasm and differing results", but "took a pass" on the issues that "truly defined his century". Harper subsequently accused Trudeau of promoting "unabashed socialism", and argued that Canadian governments between 1972 and 2002 had restricted economic growth through "state corporatism".

After the Canadian Alliance's poor showing in the 2000 election, Harper joined with other Western conservatives in co-authoring a document called the "Alberta Agenda". The letter called on Alberta to reform publicly funded health care, replace the Canada Pension Plan with a provincial plan and replace the Royal Canadian Mounted Police with a provincial police force. It became known as the "firewall letter", because it called on the provincial government to "build firewalls around Alberta" to stop the federal government from redistributing its wealth to less affluent regions. Alberta Premier Ralph Klein agreed with some of the letter's recommendations, but distanced himself from the "firewall" comments.

Harper also wrote an editorial in late 2000 arguing that Alberta and the rest of Canada were "embark[ing] on divergent and potentially hostile paths to defining their country". He said that Alberta had chosen the "best of Canada's heritage—a combination of American enterprise and individualism with the British traditions of order and co-operation" while Canada "appears content to become a second-tier socialistic country ... led by a second-world strongman appropriately suited for the task". He also called for a "stronger and much more autonomous Alberta", while rejecting calls for separatism. In the 2001 Alberta provincial election, Harper led the NCC in a "Vote Anything but Liberal" campaign. Some articles from this period described him as a possible successor to Klein.

Harper and the NCC endorsed a private school tax credit proposed by Ontario's Progressive Conservative government in 2001, arguing that it would "save about $7,000 for each student who does not attend a union-run public school". Education Minister Janet Ecker criticized this, saying that her government's intent was not to save money at the expense of public education.

Day's leadership of the Canadian Alliance became increasingly troubled throughout the summer of 2001, as several party MPs called for his resignation. In June, the National Post newspaper reported that former Reform MP Ian McClelland was organizing a possible leadership challenge on Harper's behalf. Harper announced his resignation from the NCC presidency in August 2001 to prepare a campaign.

== Opposition leader (2002–2006) ==
=== Leader of the Canadian Alliance (2002–2003) ===
Stockwell Day called a new Canadian Alliance leadership race for 2002, and soon declared himself a candidate. Harper emerged as Day's main rival, and declared his own candidacy on December 3, 2001. He eventually won the support of at least 28 Alliance MPs, including Scott Reid, James Rajotte and Keith Martin. During the campaign, Harper reprised his earlier warnings against an alliance with Quebec nationalists, and called for his party to become the federalist option in Quebec. He argued that "the French language is not imperilled in Quebec", and opposed "special status" for the province in the Canadian constitution accordingly. He also endorsed greater provincial autonomy on Medicare, and said that he would not co-operate with the Progressive Conservatives as long as they were led by Joe Clark. On social issues, Harper argued for "parental rights" to use corporal punishment against their children and supported raising the age of sexual consent. He described his potential support base as "similar to what George Bush tapped".

The tone of the leadership contest turned hostile in February 2002. Harper described Day's governance of the party as "amateurish", while his campaign team argued that Day was attempting to win re-election by building a narrow support base among different groups in the religious right. The Day campaign accused Harper of "attacking ethnic and religious minorities". In early March, the two candidates had an especially fractious debate on CBC Newsworld. The leadership vote was held on March 20, 2002. Harper was elected on the first ballot with 55% support, against 37% for Day. Two other candidates split the remainder.

After winning the party leadership, Harper announced his intention to run for Parliament in a by-election in Calgary Southwest, recently vacated by Preston Manning. Ezra Levant had been chosen as the riding's Alliance candidate and declared that he would not stand aside for Harper; he later reconsidered. The Liberals did not field a candidate, following a parliamentary tradition of allowing opposition leaders to enter the House of Commons unopposed. The Progressive Conservative candidate, Jim Prentice, also chose to withdraw. Harper defeated New Democrat Bill Phipps, a former United Church of Canada moderator. Harper told a reporter during the campaign that he "despise[d]" Phipps, and declined to debate him.

Harper officially became the leader of the Official Opposition in May 2002. Later in the same month, he said that the Atlantic Provinces were trapped in "a culture of defeat" which had to be overcome, the result of policies designed by Liberal and Progressive Conservative governments. Many Atlantic politicians condemned the remark as patronizing and insensitive. The Legislature of Nova Scotia unanimously approved a motion condemning Harper's comments, which were also criticized by New Brunswick premier Bernard Lord, federal Progressive Conservative leader Joe Clark and others. Harper refused to apologize, and said that much of Canada was trapped by the same "can't-do" attitude.

In March 2003, after their speeches in favour of the invasion gained little support in Parliament, Harper and Day co-wrote a letter to The Wall Street Journal in which they condemned the Canadian government's unwillingness to participate in the 2003 invasion of Iraq.

As party leader, Harper sought to merge the Alliance with the Progressive Conservatives (PCs) to create a united right-of-centre party. The possibility of a united conservative party increased after Peter MacKay was elected Progressive Conservative leader in May 2003. On October 16, 2003, Harper and Mackay agreed to merge the two parties to form the Conservative Party of Canada. After 95% of Alliance members voted in favour of merging with the PCs and 90% of 2,486 PC delegates voted in favour of merging with the Alliance, the Conservative Party of Canada was founded on December 7, 2003.

=== Leader of the Conservative Party ===
On January 12, 2004, Harper announced his resignation as the leader of the Official Opposition in order to run for the leadership of the Conservative Party of Canada. Harper was elected the first leader of the Conservative Party, with a first-ballot majority over Belinda Stronach and Tony Clement on March 20, 2004. Harper's victory included strong showings outside of Western Canada.

==== 2004 federal election ====
Harper led the Conservatives into the 2004 federal election. Initially, new prime minister Paul Martin held a large lead in polls, but this eroded because of infighting, the sponsorship scandal and other scandals surrounding his government. The Liberals attempted to counter this with an early election call, as this would give the Conservatives less time to consolidate their merger.

This, along with a provincial budget introduced by Liberal Premier Dalton McGuinty in Ontario, moved the Conservatives into a lead for a time. However, comments by Conservative MPs, leaked press releases accusing the then prime minister of supporting child pornography, as well as attack ads suggesting that the Conservatives had a secret agenda, caused Harper's party to lose some momentum.

The Liberals were re-elected to power with a minority government, with the Conservatives coming in second place. The Conservatives managed to make inroads into the Liberals' Ontario stronghold, primarily in the province's socially conservative central region. However, they were shut out of Quebec, marking the first time that a centre-right party did not win any seats in that province. Harper decided to remain party leader.

===== Agreement with the BQ and the NDP =====
Two months after the federal election, Harper privately met Bloc Québécois leader Gilles Duceppe and New Democratic Party leader Jack Layton in a Montreal hotel. On September 9, 2004, the three signed a letter addressed to the governor general, Adrienne Clarkson, stating, "We respectfully point out that the opposition parties, who together constitute a majority in the House, have been in close consultation. We believe that, should a request for dissolution arise this should give you cause, as constitutional practice has determined, to consult the opposition leaders and consider all of your options before exercising your constitutional authority." On the same day the letter was written, the three party leaders held a joint press conference at which they expressed their intent to co-operate on changing parliamentary rules, and to request that the governor general consult with them before deciding to call an election. At the news conference, Harper said, "It is the Parliament that's supposed to run the country, not just the largest party and the single leader of that party. That's a criticism I've had and that we've had and that most Canadians have had for a long, long time now so this is an opportunity to start to change that." At the time, Harper and the two other opposition leaders denied trying to form a coalition government. Harper said, "This is not a coalition, but this is a co-operative effort."

On October 4, Mike Duffy, who was later appointed as a Conservative senator by Harper, said: "It is possible that you could change prime minister without having an election." He added that some Conservatives wanted Harper to temporarily become prime minister without holding an election. The next day, Layton walked out on talks with Harper and Duceppe, accusing them of trying to replace Paul Martin with Harper as prime minister. Both Bloc and Conservative officials denied Layton's accusations. On March 26, 2011, Duceppe stated that Harper had tried to form a coalition government with the Bloc and NDP in response to Harper's allegations that the Liberals may form a coalition with the Bloc and the NDP.

==== 38th Parliament ====
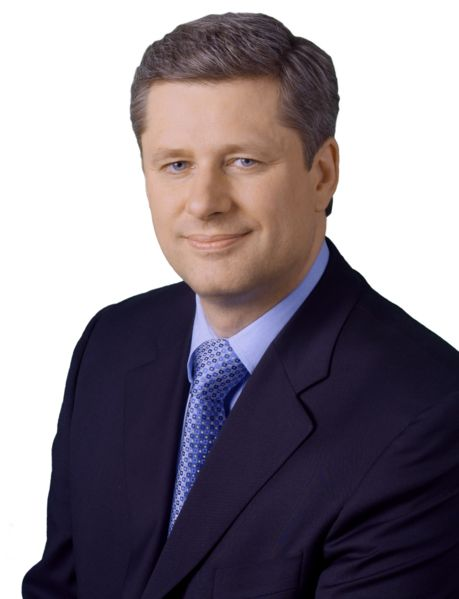
Harper in 2005

The Conservative Party's first policy convention was held from March 17 to 19, 2005, in Montreal. Harper was reported to be moving the party's policies closer to the political centre. Any opposition to abortion or bilingualism was dropped from the Conservative platform. Harper received an 84% endorsement from delegates in the leadership review.

Although the party had removed opposition to abortion and bilingualism from its platform, the Conservatives began a campaign against same-sex marriage. Harper was criticized by a group of law professors for arguing that the government could override the provincial court rulings on same-sex marriage without using the "notwithstanding clause", a provision of the Canadian Charter of Rights and Freedoms. He also argued, in general, for lower taxes, an elected Senate, a tougher stance on crime, and closer relations with the United States.

Following the April 2005 release of Jean Brault's damaging testimony at the Gomery Commission, implicating the Liberals in the scandal, opinion polls placed the Conservatives ahead of the Liberals. The Conservatives had earlier abstained from the vote on the 2005 budget to avoid forcing an election. With the collapse in Liberal support and a controversial NDP amendment to the budget, the party exerted significant pressure on Harper to bring down the government. In May, Harper announced that Martin's Liberals had lost the "moral authority to govern". Shortly thereafter, the Conservatives and Bloc Québécois united to defeat the government on a vote that some considered to be either a confidence motion or else a motion requiring an immediate test of the confidence of the House. The Martin government did not accept this interpretation and argued that the vote had been on a procedural motion, although they also indicated that they would bring forward their revised budget for a confidence vote the following week. Ultimately, the effort to bring down the Martin government failed following the decision of Conservative MP Belinda Stronach to cross the floor to the Liberal Party. The vote on the NDP amendment to the budget tied, and with the speaker of the House voting to continue the debate, the Liberals stayed in power. At the time, some considered the matter to be a constitutional crisis.

Harper was also criticized for supporting his caucus colleague MP Gurmant Grewal. Grewal had produced tapes of conversations with Tim Murphy, Paul Martin's chief of staff, in which Grewal claimed he had been offered a cabinet position in exchange for his defection.

The Liberals' support dropped sharply after the first report from the Gomery Commission was issued, but rebounded soon after. Later that month, Harper introduced a motion of no confidence on the Martin government, telling the House of Commons "that this government has lost the confidence of the House of Commons and needs to be removed". As the Liberals had lost NDP support in the House by refusing to accept an NDP plan to prevent health care privatization, the no-confidence motion was passed by a vote of 171–133. It was the first time that a Canadian government had been toppled by a straight motion of no confidence proposed by the opposition. As a result, Parliament was dissolved and a general election was scheduled for January 23, 2006.

On February 27, 2008, allegations surfaced that two Conservative Party officials offered terminally ill, independent MP Chuck Cadman a million-dollar life insurance policy in exchange for his vote to bring down the Liberal government in a May 2005 budget vote. Had the allegations been substantiated, the conduct could have constituted an offence under the Criminal Code, which prohibits bribing an MP.

When asked by Vancouver journalist Tom Zytaruk about the alleged life insurance offer then-opposition leader Stephen Harper stated in an audio recording "I don't know the details. I know there were discussions" and goes on to say "The offer to Chuck was that it was only to replace financial considerations he might lose due to an election". Harper also stated that he had told the Conservative Party representatives that they were unlikely to succeed. "I told them they were wasting their time. I said Chuck had made up his mind." In February 2008, the Royal Canadian Mounted Police (RCMP) investigated the allegations that Section 119's provisions on bribery and corruption in the Criminal Code had been violated. The RCMP concluded its investigation, stating that there was insufficient evidence to lay charges.

Harper denied any wrongdoing and subsequently filed a civil libel suit against the Liberal Party. Because libel laws do not apply to statements made in Parliament, the basis of the lawsuit was that statements made by Liberal Party members outside the House of Commons and in articles which appeared on the Liberal Party web site made accusations that Harper had committed a criminal act.

The audio expert hired by Harper to prove that the tape containing the evidence was doctored reported that the latter part of the tape was recorded over, but the tape was unaltered where Harper's voice said "I don't know the details, I know that, um, there were discussions, um, but this is not for publication?" and goes on to say he "didn't know the details" when asked if he knew anything about the alleged offer to Cadman.

==== 2006 federal election ====
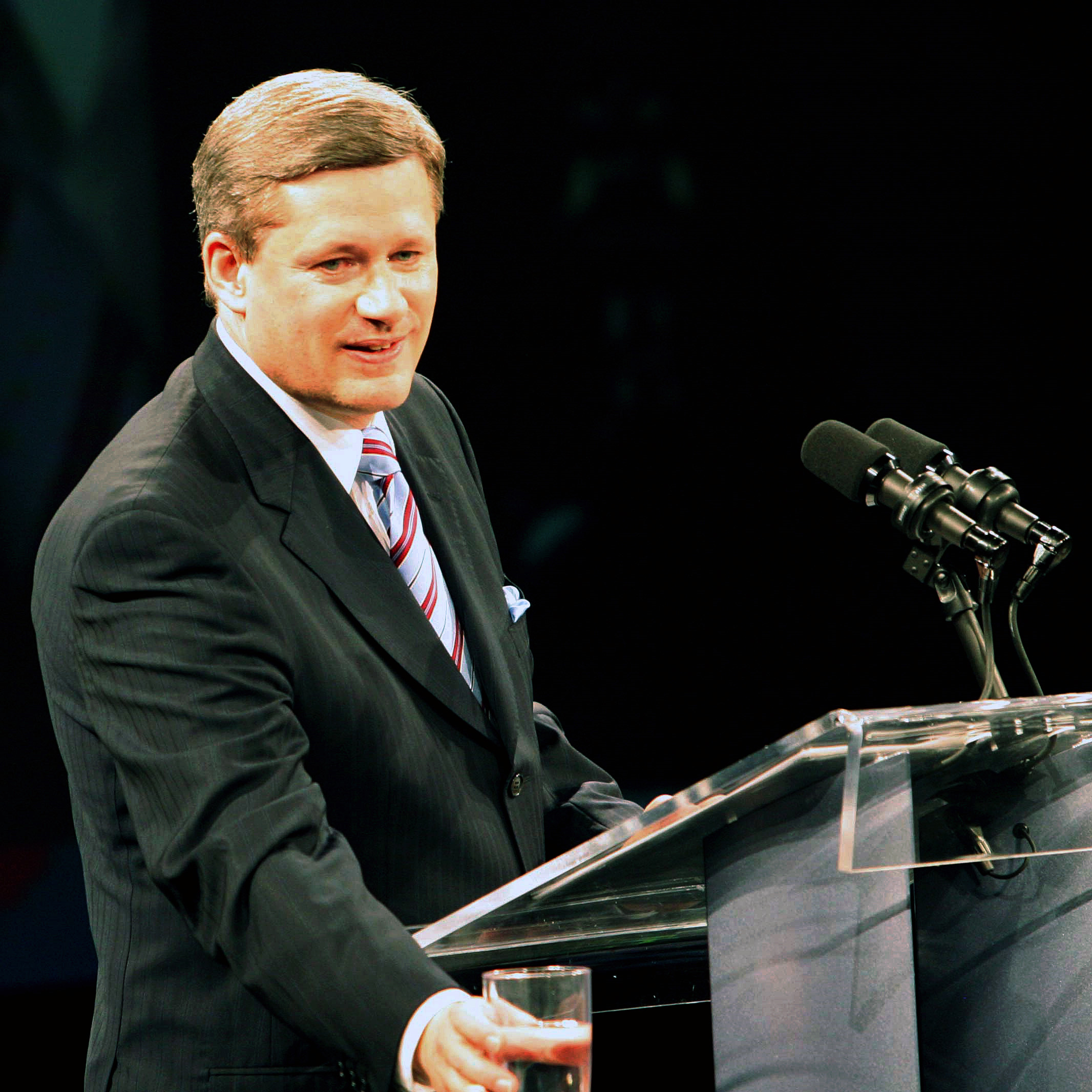
Stephen Harper giving a victory speech to party members in Calgary after the Conservatives won the 2006 federal election.

The Conservatives began the campaign period with a policy-per-day strategy, contrary to the Liberal plan of holding off major announcements until after the Christmas holidays, so Harper dominated media coverage for the first weeks of the election. Though his party showed only modest movement in the polls, Harper's personal numbers, which had always significantly trailed those of his party, began to rise. In response, the Liberals launched negative ads targeting Harper, similar to their attacks in the 2004 election. However, their tactics were not sufficient to erode the Conservatives' advantage, although they did manage to close what had been a ten-point advantage in public opinion. As Harper's personal numbers rose, polls found he was now considered not only more trustworthy, but a better choice for prime minister than Martin.

Immediately prior to the Christmas break, in a faxed letter to NDP candidate Judy Wasylycia-Leis, RCMP commissioner Giuliano Zaccardelli announced the RCMP had opened a criminal investigation into her complaint that it appeared Liberal Finance Minister Ralph Goodale's office had leaked information leading to insider trading before making an important announcement on the taxation of income trusts. On December 27, 2005, the RCMP confirmed that information in a press release. At the conclusion of the investigation, Serge Nadeau, a top civil servant in the Department of Finance, was charged with criminal breach of trust. No charges were laid against Goodale.

The election gave Harper's Conservatives the largest number of seats in the House, although not enough for a majority government, and shortly after midnight on January 24, Martin conceded defeat. Later that day, Martin informed Governor General Michaëlle Jean that he would resign as prime minister, and at 6:45 p.m. Jean asked Harper to form a government. Harper was sworn in as Canada's 22nd prime minister on February 6, 2006.

In his first address to Parliament as prime minister, Harper opened by paying tribute to the queen of Canada, Elizabeth II, and her "lifelong dedication to duty and self-sacrifice". He also said before the Canada-UK Chamber of Commerce that Canada and the United Kingdom were joined by "the golden circle of the Crown, which links us all together with the majestic past that takes us back to the Tudors, the Plantagenets, the Magna Carta, habeas corpus, petition of rights, and English common law". Journalist Graham Fraser said in the Toronto Star that Harper's speech was "one of the most monarchist speeches a Canadian prime minister has given since John Diefenbaker". An analysis by Michael D. Behiels suggested that a political realignment might be underway, based on the continuance of Harper's government.

After the election, the Conservative Party was charged with improper election spending, in a case that became known as the In and Out scandal. The case continued for years, but in 2012 the party entered a plea agreement, admitting to improper spending and falsifying records to conceal it.

== Prime Minister of Canada (2006–2015) ==
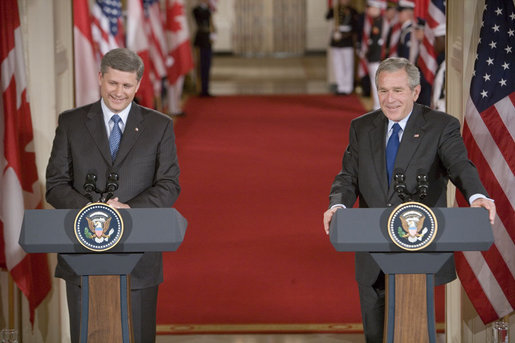
Harper with George W. Bush, July 6, 2006.

=== Elections ===
==== 2008 federal election ====
On October 14, 2008, after a five-week campaign, the Conservatives increased their seat count in Parliament to 143, up from 127 at the dissolution of the previous Parliament; however, the actual popular vote among Canadians dropped slightly by 167,494 votes. As a result of the lowest voter turnout in Canadian electoral history, this represented only 22% of eligible Canadian voters, the lowest level of support of any winning party in Canadian history. Meanwhile, the number of opposition Liberal MPs fell from 95 to 77 seats. A majority in Canada's 308-seat Parliament required 155 MPs, leaving Harper with another minority government.

==== 2008 parliamentary dispute and prorogation ====
On December 4, 2008, Harper asked Governor General Michaëlle Jean to prorogue Parliament to avoid a vote of confidence scheduled for the following Monday, becoming the first Canadian prime minister to do so. The request was granted by Jean, and the prorogation lasted until January 26, 2009. The opposition coalition dissolved shortly after, with the Conservatives winning a Liberal-supported confidence vote on January 29, 2009.

==== 2010 prorogation ====
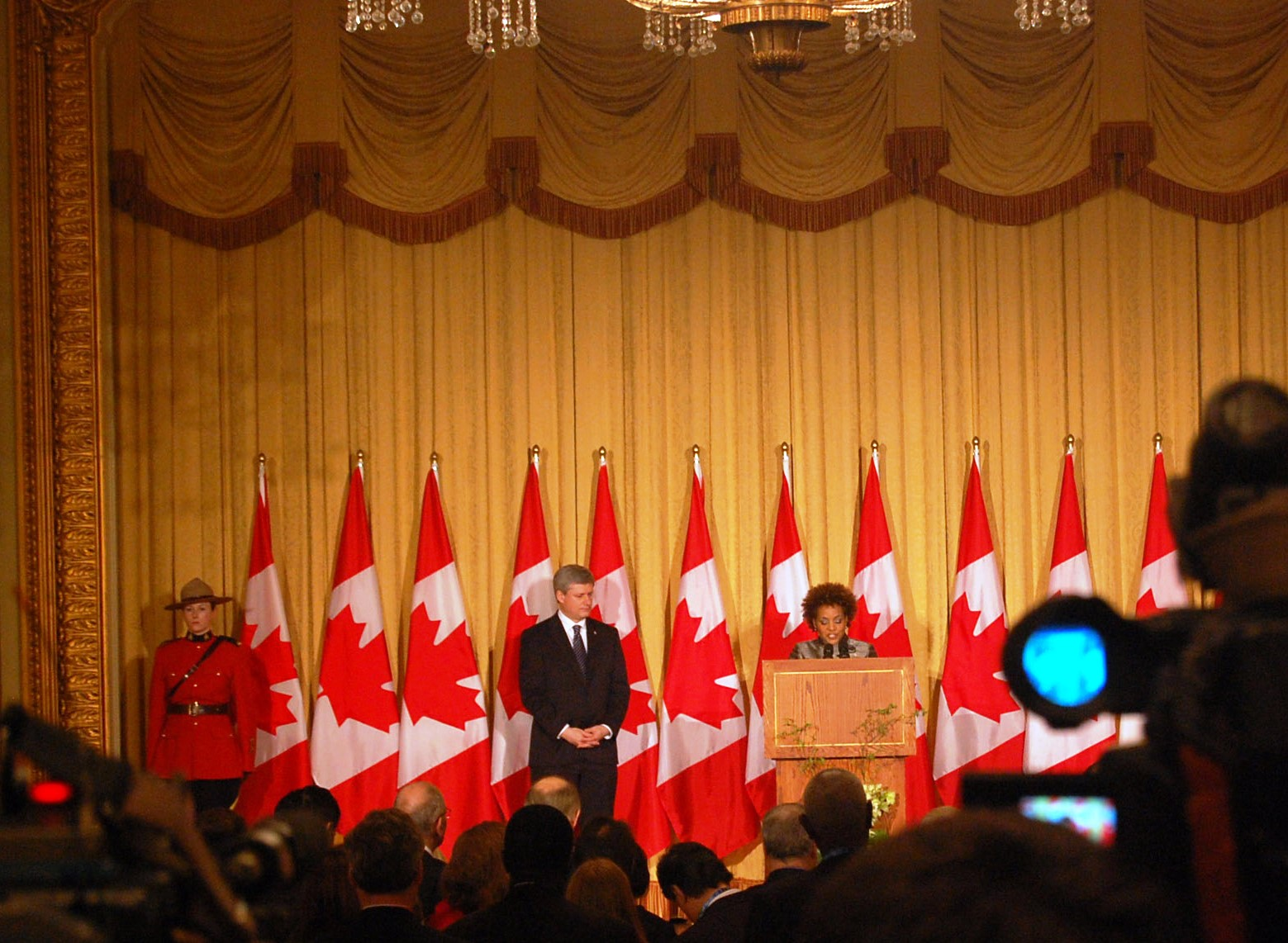
Prime Minister Stephen Harper and Governor General Michaëlle Jean at 2010 Vancouver Winter Olympic Games Heads of State Reception.

On December 30, 2009, Harper announced that he would request the governor general to prorogue Parliament again, effective immediately on the same day, during the 2010 Winter Olympics and lasting until March 3, 2010. Harper stated that this was necessary for Canada's economic plan. Jean granted the request. In an interview with CBC News, Prince Edward Island Liberal MP Wayne Easter accused the prime minister of "shutting democracy down". Tom Flanagan, Harper's University of Calgary mentor and former chief of staff, also questioned Harper's reasoning for prorogation, stating that "I think the government's talking points haven't been entirely credible" and that the government's explanation of proroguing was "skirting the real issue—which is the harm the opposition parties are trying to do to the Canadian Forces" regarding the Canadian Afghan detainee issue. Small demonstrations took place on January 23 in 64 Canadian cities and towns and five cities in other countries. A Facebook protest group attracted over 20,000 members.

A poll released by Angus Reid on January 7 found that 53 per cent of respondents were opposed to the prorogation, while 19 per cent supported it. 38 per cent believed Harper used the prorogation to curtail the Afghan detainee inquiry, while 23 per cent agreed with Harper's explanation that the prorogation was necessary economically.

==== 2011 vote of no confidence ====
Harper's Cabinet was defeated in a no-confidence vote on March 25, 2011, after being found in contempt of Parliament. Harper thus, in accordance with constitutional convention, advised the governor general to call a general election. This was the first occurrence in Commonwealth history of a government in the Westminster parliamentary tradition losing the confidence of the lower house on the grounds of contempt of parliament. The no-confidence motion was carried with a vote of 156 in favour of the motion and 145 against.

==== 2011 federal election ====
On May 2, 2011, after a five-week campaign, Harper led the Conservatives to their third consecutive election victory—the first time a centre-right party has accomplished this in half a century. The Conservatives increased their standing in parliament to 166, up from 143 at the dissolution of the previous parliament. This resulted in the first centre-right majority government since the Progressive Conservatives had won their last majority in 1988. The Conservatives also received a greater number of total votes than in 2008. Notably, the Conservatives had a significant breakthrough in southern Ontario, a region where neither they nor the Reform/Alliance side of the merger had done well in the previous two decades. They managed to win several seats in Toronto itself; no centre-right party had won seats in the former Metro Toronto since 1988.

The election ended five years of minority governments, made the New Democratic Party the Official Opposition for the first time, relegated the Liberals to third place for the first time, made Elizabeth May Canada's first Green Party member of Parliament, and reduced the Bloc Québécois from 47 to 4 seats.

After the election, the Conservatives were accused of cheating in the Robocall scandal, mainly suppressing votes by directing voters to bogus polling stations. There were complaints in 247 of Canada's 308 ridings, but only one person was charged; Conservative staffer Michael Sona was convicted and jailed.

==== 2015 federal election ====
Under the Canada Elections Act, a general election had to take place no later than October 19, 2015. On August 2, at Harper's request, Governor General David Johnston issued the election writs for October 19. In that election, Harper's Conservative Party was defeated by Justin Trudeau's Liberals, and became the Official Opposition, dropping to only 99 seats out of 338. This was mainly because of a collapse of Conservative support in southern Ontario, a region that swung heavily to them in 2011. They lost all of their seats in Toronto, and won only three seats in the Greater Toronto Area. They were also shut out of Atlantic Canada—the first time in decades that there were no centre-right MPs from that region. Harper was re-elected in Calgary Heritage, essentially a reconfigured version of his former riding.

Hours after conceding defeat on election night, Harper resigned as leader of the Conservative Party and returned to the backbench. Former Cabinet minister Rona Ambrose was elected interim leader by the Conservative caucus, pending a formal leadership election. Harper resigned as prime minister during a meeting with Governor General David Johnston, who accepted the resignation, after which Johnston invited Trudeau to form a government on November 4, 2015. After Andrew Scheer resigned as Conservative leader in 2019, the National Post criticized Harper, by stating that he "lost in 2015 in a way that left his party struggling to make any sense at all, including on deficits."

=== Domestic and economic policy ===
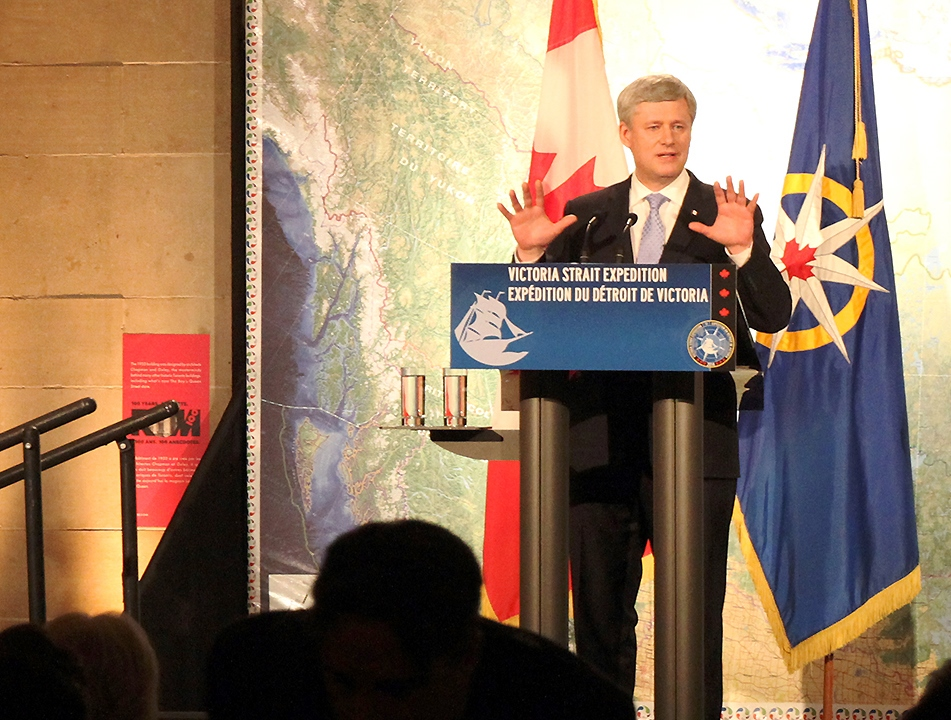
Harper appearing at a gala at the Royal Ontario Museum in Toronto to celebrate the discovery of HMS Erebus, one of two ships wrecked during John Franklin's lost expedition.

==== Constitutional issues ====
In 2006, a proposed Bloc Québécois motion calling for Quebec to be recognized as a "nation" prompted Harper to address the Quebec sovereignty debate. On November 22, 2006, Harper introduced his own motion to recognize that "the Québécois form a nation within a united Canada." Five days later, Harper's motion passed, with a margin of 266–16; all federalist parties, and the Bloc Québécois, supported it.

In 2004, Harper said "the Upper House remains a dumping ground for the favoured cronies of the prime minister". Between 2006 and 2008, by which time Harper was prime minister, he did not recommend candidates to the governor general for appointment to the Senate, resulting in 16 Senate vacancies by the October 2008 election. The one exception was Michael Fortier. When Harper took office, he advised the governor general to appoint Michael Fortier to both the Senate and the Cabinet, arguing the government needed representation from the city of Montreal. Although there is a precedent for this action in Canadian history, the appointment led to criticism from opponents who claimed Harper was reneging on his push for an elected Senate. In 2008, Fortier gave up his Senate seat and sought election as an MP, but lost to the incumbent Bloc Québécois MP.

After the October 2008 election, Harper again named Senate reform as a priority. By December, he recommended the appointment of 18 senators and, in 2009, provided an additional nine people for appointment as senators. Many of those appointed had close ties with the Conservative Party, including the campaign manager of the Conservative Party, Doug Finley. Critics accused Harper of hypocrisy (the Liberals coined the term "Harpocrisy"). Conservative senator Bert Brown defended Harper's appointments and said "the only way [the Senate]'s ever been filled is by having people that are loyal to the prime minister who's appointing them".

==== Economic management ====
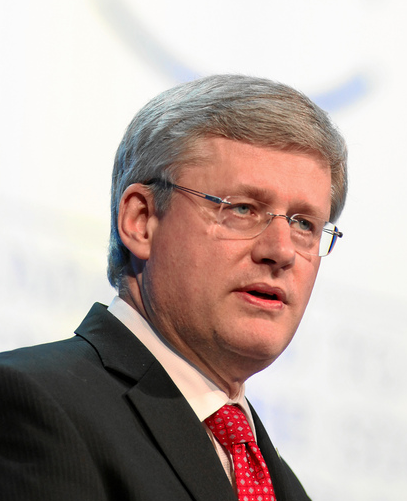
Harper during the 'Special Address' at the 2012 Annual Meeting of the World Economic Forum at the congress centre in Davos, Switzerland, January 26, 2012.

During Harper's tenure, Canada had budgetary surpluses in 2006 and 2007 of $13.8 and $9.6 billion respectively. Following the 2008 financial crisis, Canada ran deficits from 2008–2013. The deficit was $55.6 billion in 2009 and was gradually lowered to $5.2 billion in 2013. Harper cut both the GST and corporate taxes aggressively. In 2014, the federal budget was balanced with a surplus of $1.9 billion. For 2015–2016, the federal government initially projected a $1.4-billion surplus. Following Harper's defeat in the 2015 Canadian federal election and the change in party control, the 2015 fiscal year ended in a $1 billion deficit instead. In 2010, Canada had the lowest debt-to-GDP ratio in the G7 economies. The Economist magazine stated that Canada had come out the recession stronger than any other rich country in the G7. In 2013, Canada introduced Global Markets Action Plan to generate employment opportunities for Canadians.

==== 2011 Census ====
Ahead of the Canada 2011 Census, the government announced that the long-form questionnaire (which collects detailed demographic information) would no longer be mandatory. According to Minister of Industry Tony Clement, the change was made because of privacy-related complaints and after consulting with Statistics Canada. However, the federal privacy commissioner reported only receiving three complaints between 1995 and 2010, according to a report in the Toronto Sun.

Munir Sheikh, the chief statistician of Canada—appointed on Harper's advice—resigned on July 21, 2010, in protest of the government's change in policy. Ivan Fellegi, a former chief statistician, criticized the government's decision, saying that those who are most vulnerable (such as people living in poverty, new immigrants, and Indigenous people) are least likely to respond to a voluntary form, which reduces the reliability of demographic information about these groups.

The move was opposed by some governmental and non-governmental organizations. Federation of Canadian Municipalities; the Toronto government; Canadian Jewish Congress; Evangelical Fellowship of Canada; Canadian Conference of Catholic Bishops; Canadian Medical Association; Statistical Society of Canada; the American Statistical Association; and Registered Nurses Association of Ontario all opposed the change. However, the Fraser Institute supported the change. The provincial governments of Ontario, Quebec, New Brunswick, Prince Edward Island and Manitoba also opposed the change.

==== Veterans ====
Under Harper, the annual budget of Veterans Affairs Canada increased from $2.85 billion in 2005–2006 to $3.55 billion in 2014–2015, while the number of veterans served declined from 219,152 in 2008–2009 to 199,154 in 2015. Nine Veterans Affairs offices were closed between 2012 and 2015, and 900 positions were phased out from the department since 2009. Former veterans affairs minister Erin O'Toole stated that the closures were made to modernize the department, by moving services online and to Service Canada locations. In 2006, Harper implemented the New Veterans Charter passed with all party support by the previous Liberal government. This charter gave veterans the option to select a lump-sum payment, annual instalments over a period chosen by the veteran, or a combination of these two payment options. Under Harper, the Canadian government spent $700,000 fighting a class-action lawsuit brought by a group of wounded Afghan veterans who argued that the new charter was discriminatory.

=== Foreign policy ===
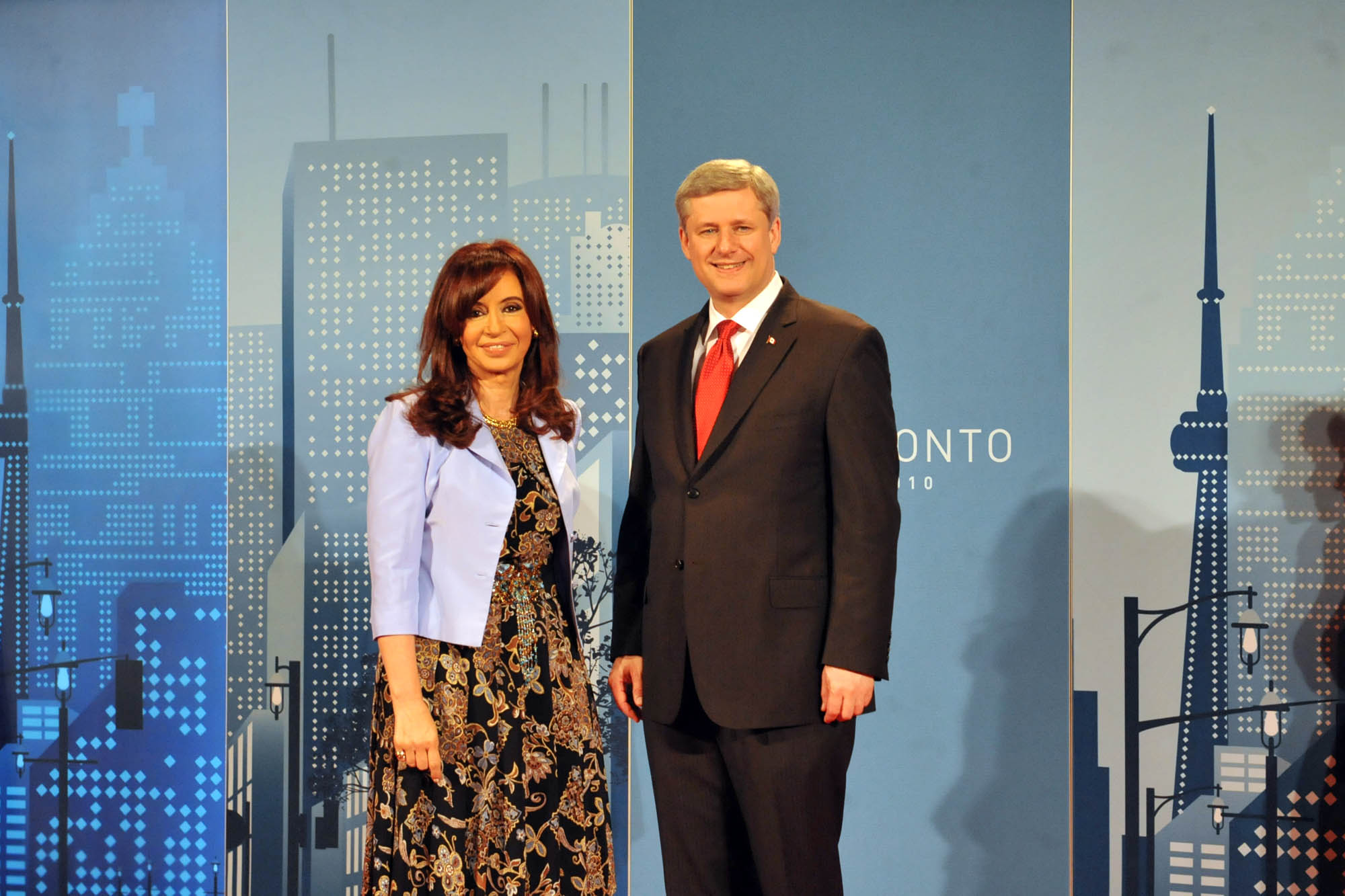
President of Argentina Cristina Kirchner and Harper in Toronto, 2010.

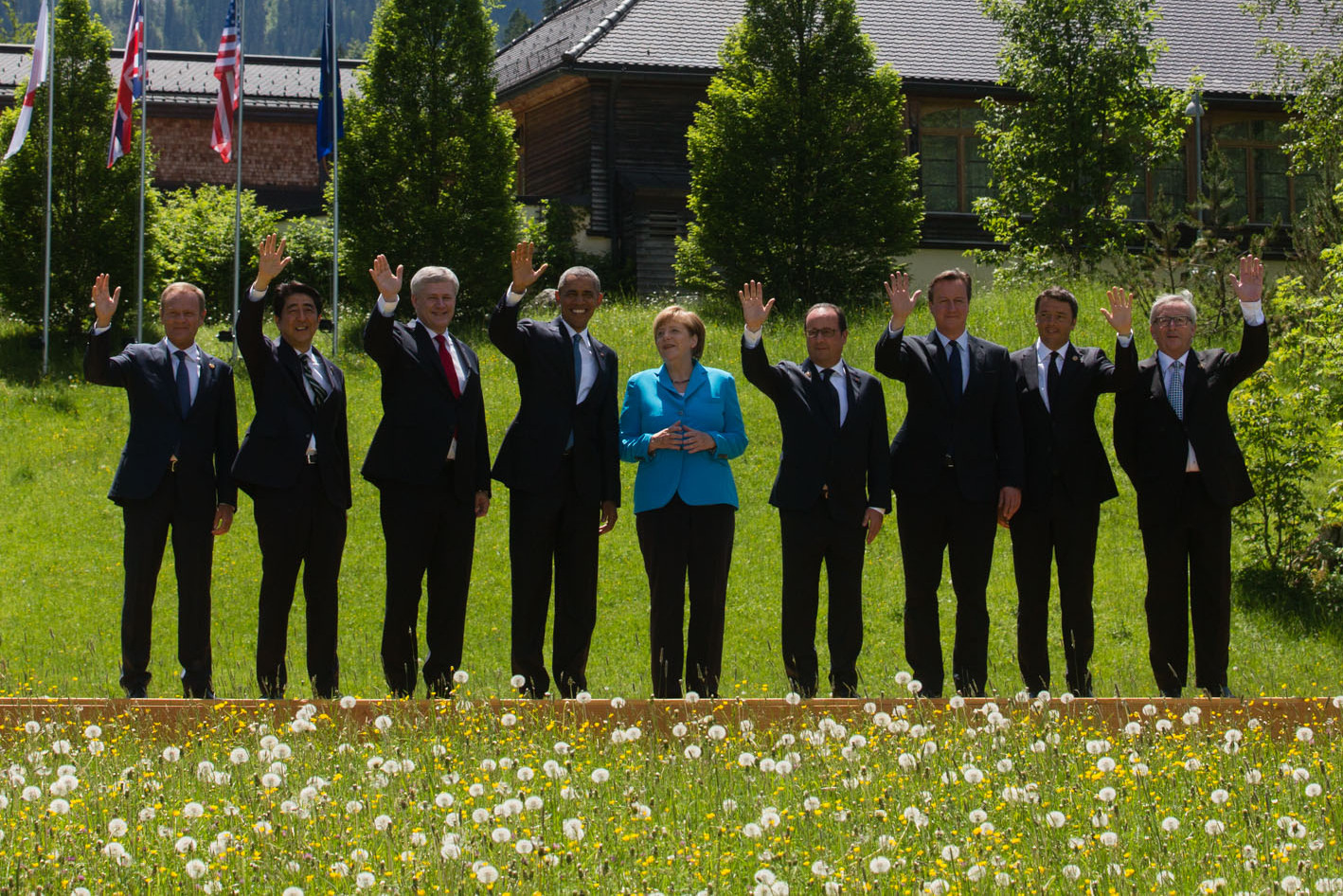
Harper at the 2015 G-7 summit with Donald Tusk, Shinzō Abe, Barack Obama, Angela Merkel, François Hollande, David Cameron, Matteo Renzi, and Jean-Claude Juncker in Bavaria, Germany.

During his term, Harper dealt with many foreign policy issues relating to the United States, the war on terror, the Arab–Israeli conflict, free trade, China, and Africa.

He reduced defence spending to 1 per cent of Canadian GDP.

In 2009, Harper visited China. During the visit, Chinese premier Wen Jiabao criticized Harper for not visiting earlier, pointing out that "this is the first meeting between the Chinese premier and a Canadian prime minister in almost five years"; Harper responded, "it's almost been five years since we had yourself or President Hu in our country." In 2008, former prime minister Jean Chrétien had criticized Harper for missing opening ceremonies for the 2008 Summer Olympics in Beijing; in response, Dimitri Soudas, a spokesperson for Harper, called the remarks hypocritical, pointing out that Chrétien "attended one of six Olympic opening ceremonies during his 13 [sic] years as prime minister".

On September 11, 2007, Harper visited Australia and addressed its Parliament.

On January 20, 2014, Harper addressed the Israeli Knesset in Givat Ram, Jerusalem.

During mid-2015, Harper repeatedly voiced his opinion that Russia should be excluded from association with the G7 group of nations because of Russia's involvement in the conflict in eastern Ukraine. On June 8, Harper said, "Mr. Putin ... has no place at the [G7] table, and I don't believe there's any leader who would defend Mr. Putin having a place."

Michael Ignatieff criticized Harper for cutting foreign aid to Africa by $700 million, falling short of the UN Millennium Development Goals, and cutting eight African countries from the list of priority aid recipients.

==== Afghanistan ====
On March 11 and 12, 2006, Harper made a surprise trip to Afghanistan, where Canadian Forces personnel had been deployed as part of the NATO-led International Security Assistance Force since late 2001, to visit troops in theatre as a show of support for their efforts, and as a demonstration of the government's commitment to reconstruction and stability in the region. Harper's choice of a first foreign visit was closely guarded from the press until his arrival in Afghanistan (citing security concerns), and is seen as marking a significant change in relationship between the government and the military. Harper returned to Afghanistan on May 22, 2007, in a surprise two-day visit which included visiting Canadian troops at the forward operating base at Ma'Sum Ghar, located 25 kilometres (16 mi) south of Kandahar, making Harper the first prime minister to have visited the front lines of a combat operation.

==== Israel ====
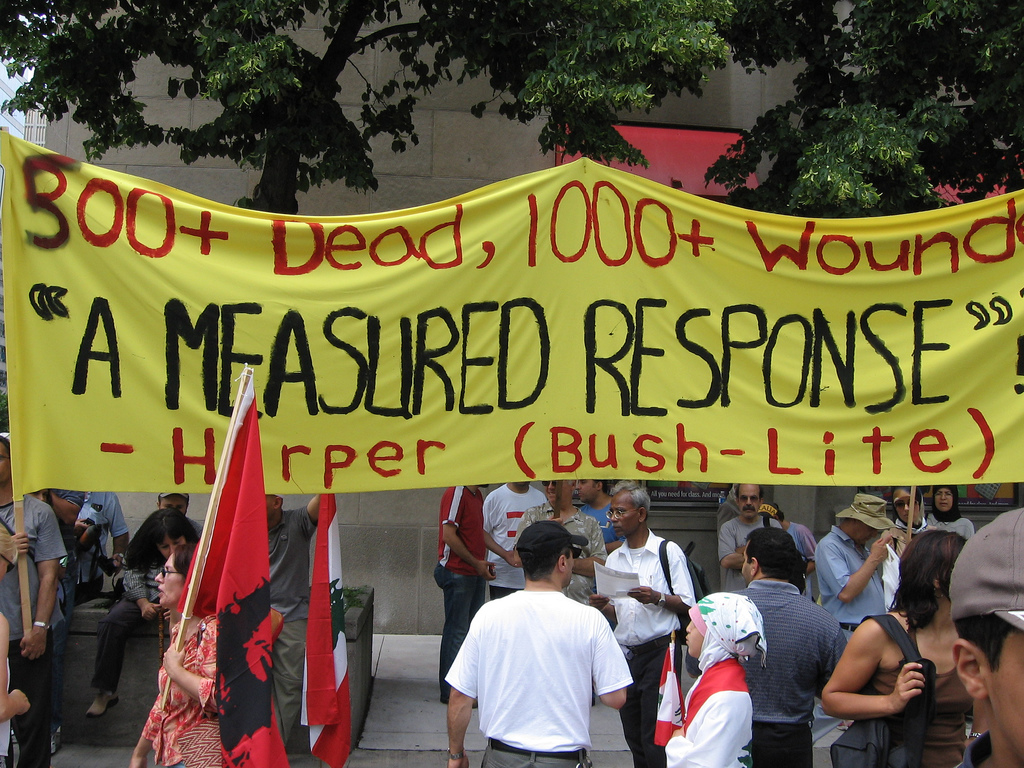
A banner criticizing Harper's response to the 2006 Israel–Lebanon conflict, Toronto.

Harper has expressed support for Israel since the early 1990s. Toronto rabbi Philip Scheim, who accompanied Harper to Israel in 2014 said, "I sense that [Harper] sees Israel as a manifestation of justice and a righting of historical wrongs, especially in light of the Holocaust."

At the outset of the 2006 Israel–Lebanon conflict, Harper defended Israel's "right to defend itself" and described its military campaign in Lebanon as a "measured" response, arguing that Hezbollah's release of kidnapped Israel Defense Force (IDF) soldiers would be the key to ending the conflict. Speaking of the situation in both Lebanon and Gaza on July 18, Harper said he wanted "not just a ceasefire, but a resolution" but such a thing would not happen until Hezbollah and Hamas recognize Israel's right to exist. Harper blamed Hezbollah for all the civilian deaths. He asserted that Hezbollah's objective is to destroy Israel through violence.

The media noted that Harper did not allow reporters opportunities to ask him questions on his position. Some Canadians, including many Arab and Lebanese Canadians, criticized Harper's description of Israel's response.

In December 2008, the Conference of Presidents of Major American Jewish Organizations recognized Harper's support for Israel with its inaugural International Leadership Award, pointing out Harper's decision to boycott the Durban II anti-racism conference, and his government's "support for Israel and [its] efforts at the U.N. against incitement and ... the delegitimization of Israel".

In March 2009, Harper spoke at a Parliament Hill ceremony organized by Chabad-Lubavitch to honour the Jewish victims of the 2008 Mumbai attacks, which included an attack on the Nariman House. He expressed condolences over the murder at Chabad's Mumbai centre of Rabbi Gavriel Holtzberg and his wife Rivka. Harper described the killings as "affronts to the values that unite all civilized people". Harper described the prompt appointment of a new rabbi at the Chabad centre in Mumbai as a signal that the Jewish people would "never bow to violence and hatred".

In 2010, Canada lost a bid for a seat on the UN Security Council. While initially blaming the loss on his rival Ignatieff, Harper later said that it was due to his pro-Israeli stance. Harper then said that he would take a pro-Israeli stance, no matter what the political cost to Canada. Ignatieff criticized Harper's stance as a "mistake", saying Canada would be better able to defend Israel through the Security Council than from the sidelines and argued that the Security Council would determine whether sanctions would be imposed on Iran. Ignatieff also accused Harper of steering the discussion away from implementing the two-state solution, and instead of rendering all discussion into a competition "about who is Israel's best friend".

Harper backed Israel's 2014 war in Gaza and condemned Hamas. Harper said, "It is evident that Hamas is deliberately using human shields to further terror in the region."

==== Free trade with EFTA ====
On June 7, 2007, the Conservative government announced it had finalized free trade negotiations with the European Free Trade Association (EFTA). Under this agreement, Canada increased its trade ties with Iceland, Norway, Switzerland and Liechtenstein. In 2006, the value of trade between these partners was $10.7 billion. Canada had originally begun negotiations with the EFTA on October 9, 1998, but talks broke down because of a disagreement over subsidies to shipyards in Atlantic Canada.

==== United States ====
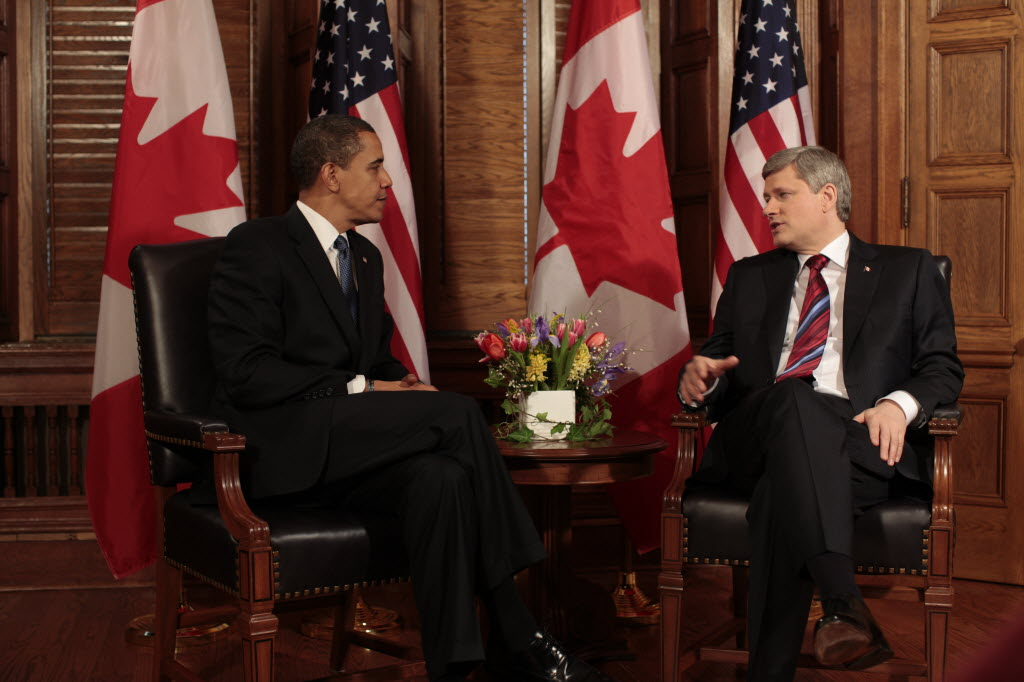
Harper meets with US president Barack Obama in Ottawa, February 19, 2009.

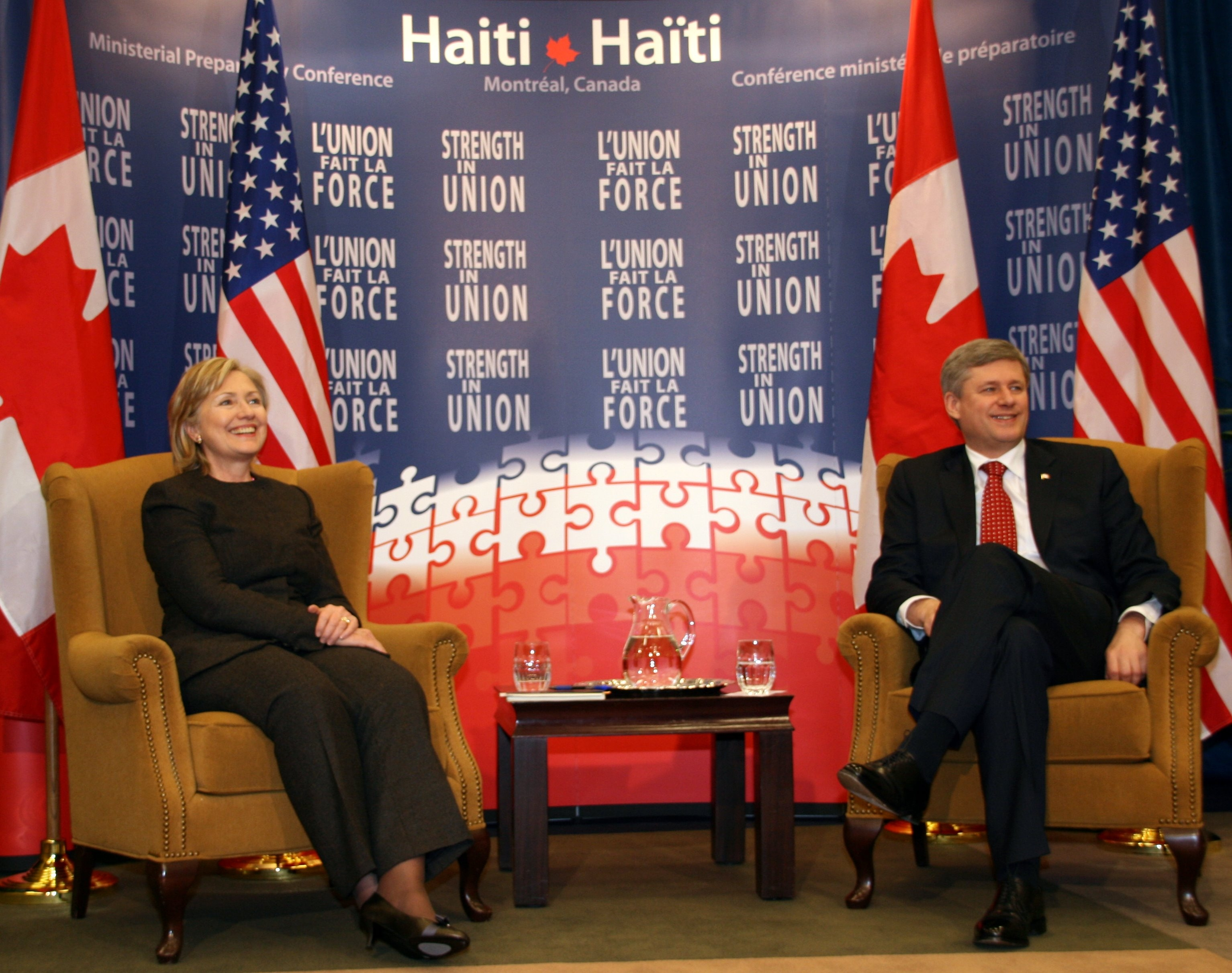
Harper and US Secretary of State Hillary Clinton at the Haiti Ministerial Preparatory Conference addressing earthquake relief in Montreal, January 25, 2010.

Shortly after being congratulated by George W. Bush for his victory, Harper rebuked US Ambassador David Wilkins for criticizing the Conservatives' plans to assert Canada's sovereignty over the Arctic Ocean waters with armed forces. Harper's first meeting as prime minister with the US president occurred at the end of March 2006.

The Harper government attracted coverage in the U.S. media during the Democratic Party's 2008 presidential primaries after the details of a conversation between Barack Obama's economic advisor Austan Goolsbee, and Canadian diplomat Georges Rioux were revealed. Reportedly Goolsbee was reassuring the Canadians that Obama's comments on potentially renegotiating the North American Free Trade Agreement (NAFTA) were more political rhetoric than actual policy. The accuracy of these reports has been debated by both the Obama campaign and the Canadian government. The news came at a key time nearing the Ohio and Texas primaries, as many Democratic voters believed that the benefits of NAFTA were dubious. The impression that Obama was not being completely forthright was attacked by his opponent Hillary Clinton.

ABC News reported that Harper's chief of staff Ian Brodie was responsible for leaking the details to the media. Harper denied that Brodie was responsible for the leak and launched an investigation to find the source. The Opposition, as well as Democratic strategist Bob Shrum, criticized the government on the issue, stating they were trying to help the Republicans by helping Hillary Clinton win the Democratic nomination instead of Obama. They also alleged the leak would hurt relations with the United States if Obama ever were to become president. Obama was elected president in November 2008. In February 2009, he made his first foreign visit as US president to Ottawa, where he affirmed support for free trade with Canada, as well as praising Canada for its involvement in Afghanistan.

=== Environmental policy ===
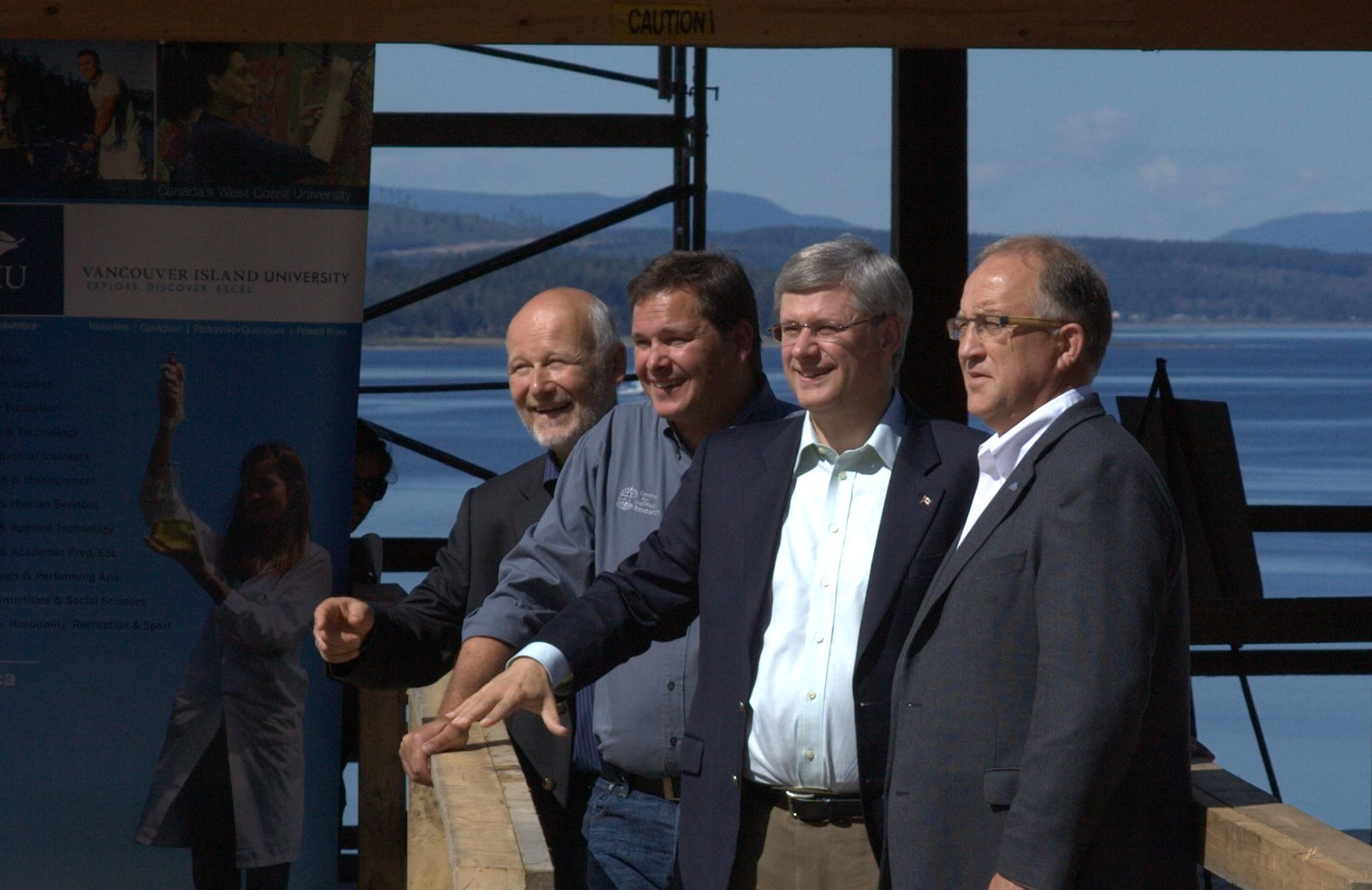
Stephen Harper visiting Vancouver Island University's Deep Bay Marine Field Station in 2010.

From 2006 to 2010, Canadian greenhouse gas emissions fell from 749 to 726 Mt of carbon dioxide equivalent (CO_{2} eq). From 1993 until 2006, during the previous Liberal government, greenhouse gas emissions increased from 600 to 749 Mt of CO_{2} eq. The reduction corresponded to Canada's decreased economic output during the Great Recession and emissions began increasing slightly in 2010, when the economy began recovering. Other significant factors in Canada's decreased emissions during Harper's tenure are initiatives such as the carbon tax in British Columbia, the cap and trade system in Quebec, Ontario discontinuing use of coal-fired power plants, and the Clean Air Regulatory Agenda which regulates emissions for automobiles and light trucks. In 2006, a "Clean Air and Climate Change Act" was proposed to address air pollution as well as greenhouse gas emissions; it never became law. In 2006, the Clean Air Regulatory Agenda (CARA) was established to "support Government of Canada efforts to reduce greenhouse gas (GHG) and air pollutant emissions in order to improve the environment and health of Canadians".

In December 2011, the Harper government announced that Canada would formally withdraw from the Kyoto Protocol. Environment Minister Peter Kent stated, "It's now clear that Kyoto is not the path forward for a global solution to climate change." In December 2012, Canada became the first signatory to formally withdraw from the Kyoto Protocol.

==== Renewable energy ====
Other federal initiatives included the 2011 loan guarantee towards the Lower Churchill Project in Labrador. The Lower Churchill's two hydroelectric installations at Gull Island and Muskrat Falls have a combined capacity of over 3,074 MW and have the ability to provide 16.7 TW·h of electricity per year, which is enough to "reduce greenhouse gas emissions equivalent to taking 3.2 million vehicles off the road each year".

==== Public transit ====
In 2006, Harper introduced the 'Public Transit Tax Credit', where individuals could claim 15 per cent of the cost of a transit pass each year. From 2006 to 2013, the Harper government invested over $5 billion towards public transit projects in Canada. In 2006, the federal government provided $697 million towards the Toronto York–Spadina Subway Extension. In September 2013, Finance Minister Jim Flaherty announced a federal contribution of $660 million towards the Scarborough subway extension.

=== Transparency ===
The Harper government faced criticism over restrictions on government scientists' communications with the media and reductions in research and data collection. During this government, scientists employed by the government were not able to speak with the media and inform the public of their findings without government permission, the government made significant cuts to research and other forms of data collection, and significant destruction and inaccessibility of government-held data and documents occurred. Over 2,000 scientists were dismissed and funding was cut from world-renowned research facilities. Funding cuts also led to the closure of some programs, including the monitoring of smoke stack emissions, food inspections, oil spills, water quality, and climate change. During this time, the long form census was also discontinued as a mandatory part of the census. This was ostensibly due to privacy concerns, however, the number of complaints about privacy proved to be minimal.

During the Harper government, it was not possible for government-employed scientists to openly speak about the government policy that prohibited communication with the media. However, following the election of a new government in 2015, several scientists who were or had been employed by the government came forward to confirm the allegations made by anonymous sources during the Harper years.

The government closed a number of government libraries without consultation on the closings or the process involved. The manner in which it was done received significant criticism because it left the remaining information in disarray, inaccessible for research.

=== Appointments ===
In 2008, Harper appointed Mark Carney to the office of governor of the Bank of Canada. According to Carney, in 2012, Harper asked Carney—who was then governor of the Bank of Canada—if he would join the Conservative government as minister of finance. Carney declined, stating in a February 2025 interview with the CBC that he felt it "wasn't appropriate" for him to proceed with the offer because he felt it was not right to "go directly from being governor into elective politics." In 2013, Harper appointed Stephen Poloz as governor of the Bank of Canada.

==== Supreme Court ====
During Harper's premiership, the following justices were appointed to the Supreme Court of Canada:

- Marshall Rothstein (March 1, 2006 – August 31, 2015)
- Thomas Cromwell (September 5, 2008 – September 1, 2016)
- Andromache Karakatsanis (October 21, 2011 – present)
- Michael J. Moldaver (October 21, 2011 – September 1, 2022)
- Richard Wagner (October 5, 2012 – present)
- Clément Gascon (June 9, 2014 – September 15, 2019)
- Suzanne Côté (December 1, 2014 – present)
- Russell Brown (August 31, 2015 – June 12, 2023)

==== Senate ====
Harper, on January 29, 2010, advised the governor general to appoint new Conservative senators to fill five vacancies in the Senate, one each for Quebec, Newfoundland and Labrador, and New Brunswick, and two for Ontario. The new senators were Pierre-Hugues Boisvenu, of Quebec; Bob Runciman, of Ontario; Vim Kochhar, of Ontario; Elizabeth Marshall of Newfoundland and Labrador; and Rose-May Poirier, of New Brunswick. This changed the party standings in the Senate, which had previously been dominated by Liberals, to 51 Conservatives, 49 Liberals, and five others.

== Post-premiership (2015–present) ==
=== Conservative backbencher (2015–2016) ===
Harper returned to Ottawa as a Conservative backbencher and addressed a meeting of the Conservative caucus that included defeated MPs in November 2015. Interim leader Rona Ambrose stated that Harper would be in the House for key votes as the member for Calgary Heritage, but had earned the right to keep a low profile after his service as the prime minister. In February 2018, Harper stated that he could have still "easily" been leader of the Conservative Party, but he chose not to amass too much power in order to secure the party's fortunes in the future.

In December 2015, Harper had set up Harper & Associates Consulting Inc., a corporation that lists him as a director alongside close associates Ray Novak and Jeremy Hunt.

Harper announced in May 2016 that he planned to resign his seat in the House of Commons during the summer before the fall session of Parliament. On May 26, 2016, he was named as a board member for the Conservative Party's fundraising arm. Harper and other directors played a role in the removal of Harper–appointed Conservative executive director Dustin Van Vught to avoid backlash from donors and grassroots conservatives. In the same month, Harper delivered a speech to the 2016 Conservative Party convention where his accomplishments as party leader and prime minister were honoured by the party.

=== After politics (2016–present) ===
In October 2017, Harper received media attention for criticizing Prime Minister Justin Trudeau's handling of the renegotiation of the North American Free Trade Agreement started by the United States under President Donald Trump, stating that Trudeau was too unwilling to make concessions to the U.S., sided too closely with Mexico, and tried to advance left-wing policies through the renegotiations.

On February 2, 2018, Harper revealed in a statement that he knew about the sexual assault allegations against then Conservative MP Rick Dykstra during the 2015 election but could not justify removing him as a candidate because the investigation was closed by police a year before the election.

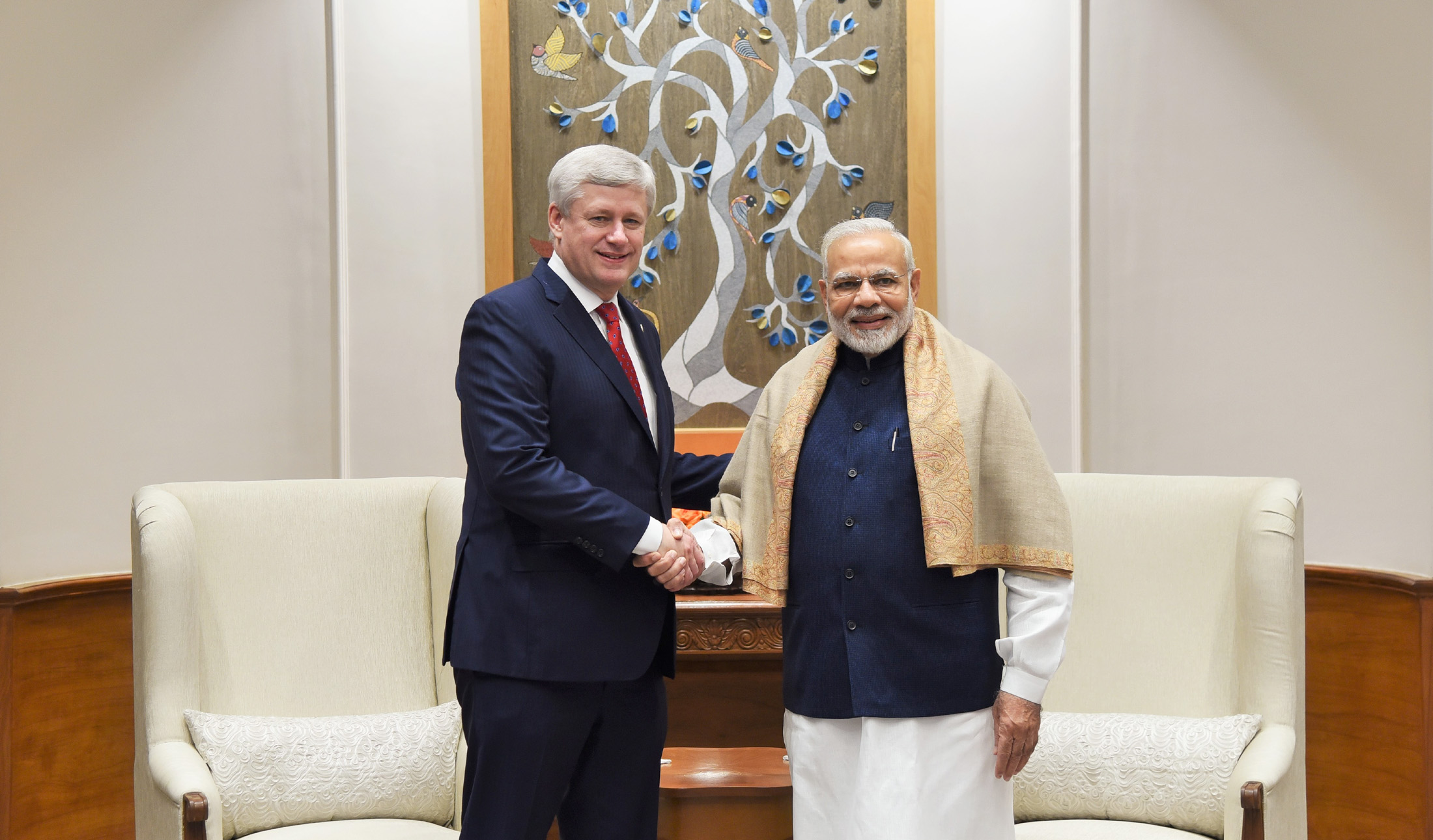
Harper with Narendra Modi in India in 2018.

On March 26, 2018, Harper attended the international Fellowship of Christians and Jews Gala at Mar-a-Lago where he expressed support for US president Donald Trump's speech on Jerusalem. On May 9, he expressed support for Trump's decision to withdraw from the Iran deal by lending his signature to an ad that appeared in The New York Times a day after the decision.

On November 19, 2018, Harper appeared on a show hosted by Ben Shapiro, where he made comments on issues such as populism, immigration and nationalism. The National Post noted that they "echo the argument made in his recently released book, Right Here, Right Now: Politics and Leadership in the Age of Disruption, which urges conservatives to listen to populist grievances, rather than focus on other priorities like tax cuts for the wealthy."

In January 2019, Harper appeared on a PragerU video explaining why Donald Trump was elected to the presidency in the 2016 United States election. Then in May 2019, he appeared on another PragerU video explaining reasons to support Israel amid the Israeli–Palestinian conflict.

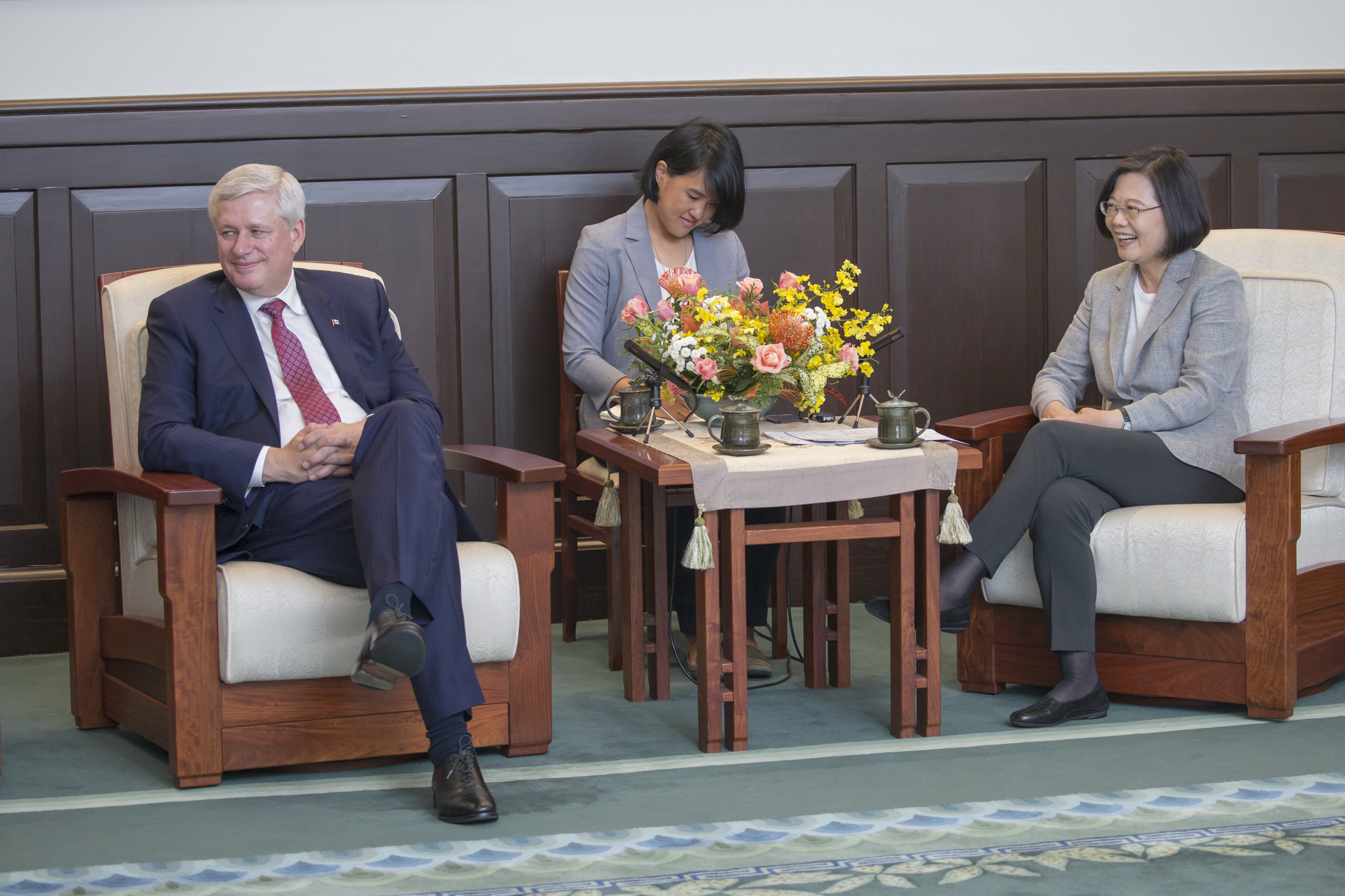
Harper with Tsai Ing-wen in Taiwan in 2019.

On March 11, 2021, during a virtual gathering hosted by the Conference of Defence Associations Institute, Harper argued that the world had entered a second Cold War between the United States and China, and that middle-power countries such as Canada are also a part of the rivalry between the two main powers.

In 2021, Harper appeared on the podcast American Optimist, hosted by Joe Lonsdale. In the interview, Harper criticized the Trudeau government's large-scale deficit spending during the COVID-19 pandemic, calling it "overkill". He also criticized "woke culture".

On July 25, 2022, Harper endorsed his former cabinet minister Pierre Poilievre for the leadership of the Conservative Party. This was the first time Harper endorsed a federal Conservative leadership candidate; he previously chose not to in the 2017 and 2020 leadership elections.

In September 2022, Harper attended Queen Elizabeth II's state funeral, along with other former Canadian prime ministers.

On March 22, 2023, during a conservative conference in Ottawa, Harper criticized the Trudeau government's handling of Chinese government interference in the 2019 and 2021 Canadian federal elections. He also criticized the NDP, calling it a "branch plant of the Liberal party" and arguing that it got "nothing" out of its confidence-and-supply agreement with the Liberal Party.

In April 2023, Harper endorsed Albertan Premier Danielle Smith for the 2023 Albertan provincial election. In November 2024, he was named as Alberta Investment Management Corporation (AIMCo) chair by Smith.

In April 2025, Harper endorsed Pierre Poilievre during a rally in Edmonton ahead of the 2025 federal election, stating that Poilievre was the best candidate for a "better, stronger and more united future." Following Mark Carney's victory, Harper advised him to reduce Canadian reliance on the United States in the wake of the 2025 United States trade war with Canada and Mexico. During the election campaign, Harper stated that Carney was taking "undue credit" for his role in the 2008 recession recovery.

In February 2026, during celebrations of the 20th anniversary of his government's first election, Harper unveiled his official portrait as prime minister in Ottawa. In September, he delivered the closing address at the Canada Investment Summit, praising the Carney government's handling of the trade war.

On October 2, 2026, Harper published an opinion piece in the Calgary Herald arguing that Alberta separatism would not benefit the province and that remaining silent on the referendum on Alberta secession was not an option.

=== The International Democracy Union ===
The International Democracy Union is an international alliance of conservative political parties. Harper became chair of the IDU in February 2018, succeeding Sir John Key, former prime minister of New Zealand, and continued to serve as chair of the alliance as of June 2025. Among the current members of the IDU are the Conservative Party of Canada, the Likud of Israel, the New Zealand National Party, the Conservative Party of the UK, and the Republican Party of the United States.

== Public image ==
In July 2019, a group of independent academics published an assessment of past prime ministers of Canada based on the number of campaign pledges and promises fulfilled. According to the study, the Harper government fulfilled 85 per cent of its pledges (including partially-completed pledges). When factoring only completed, realized pledges, the Harper government kept 77 per cent of its promises in its final year. The study found that the governments led by Harper, in addition to the government led by his successor, Justin Trudeau, had the highest rates of follow-through for campaign promises of any Canadian government in the last 35 years.

== Personal life ==
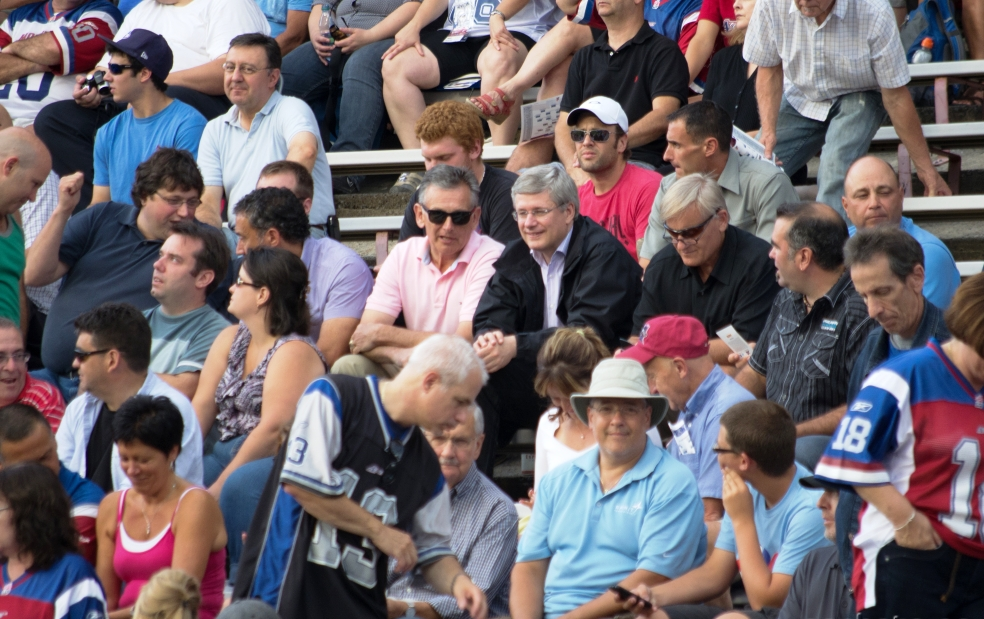
Stephen Harper and former CFL player Larry Smith watching a 2012 football game in Montreal.

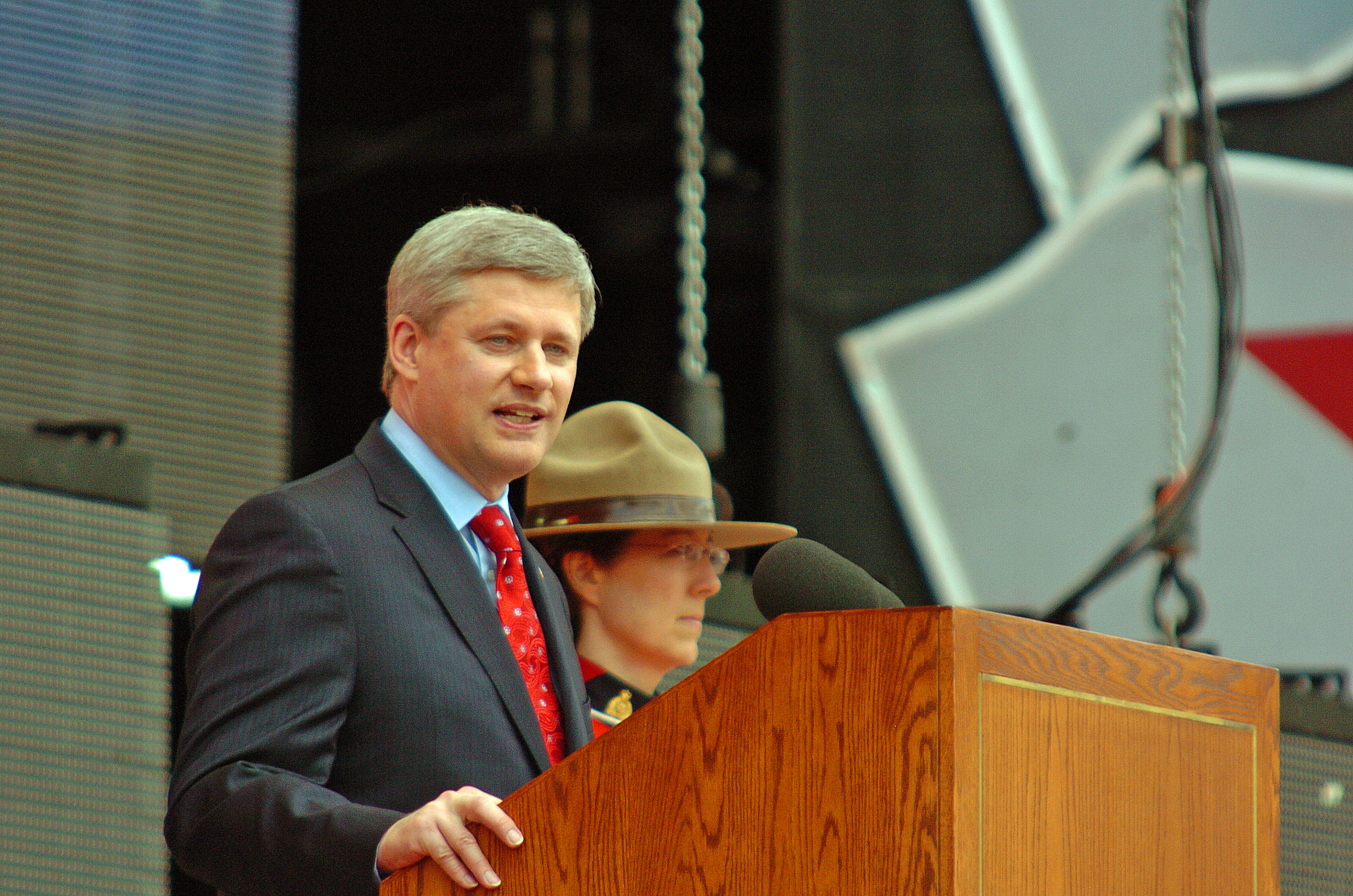
Prime Minister Stephen Harper speaking at 2009 Canada Day celebrations on Parliament Hill in Ottawa.

Harper married Laureen Teskey on December 11, 1993. Laureen was formerly married to New Zealander Neil Fenton from 1985 to 1988. The Harpers have two children: Benjamin and Rachel. Harper is the third prime minister, after Pierre Trudeau and John Turner, to send his children to Rockcliffe Park Public School, in Ottawa.

In the late 1980s, he became an evangelical Christian, a member of RockPointe Church (Christian and Missionary Alliance) in Bearspaw, a suburb of Calgary, Alberta. After moving to Ottawa in 2003, he became a member of East Gate Alliance Church.

An avid follower of ice hockey, he has been a fan of the Toronto Maple Leafs since his childhood in the Leaside and Etobicoke communities in Toronto. Harper is also a fan of the Calgary Flames. He published a book, A Great Game: The Forgotten Leafs and the Rise of Professional Hockey (2013), which chronicles the growth of professional hockey, particularly in Toronto, and writes articles occasionally on the subject. Harper appeared on The Sports Network (TSN) during the broadcast of the Canada–Russia final of the 2007 World Junior Ice Hockey Championships. He was interviewed and expressed his views on the state of hockey and his preference for an overtime period in lieu of a shoot-out. In February 2010, Harper interviewed former National Hockey League greats Wayne Gretzky and Gordie Howe for a Saskatoon Kinsmen Club charity event.

Harper had a cameo appearance in an episode of the television show Corner Gas, which aired March 12, 2007. In October 2010, he taped a cameo appearance in an episode of the television show Murdoch Mysteries, which aired July 20, 2011, during the show's fourth season.

Harper owns an extensive vinyl record collection and is a fan of the Beatles and AC/DC. In October 2009, he joined Yo-Yo Ma on stage in a National Arts Centre gala and performed "With a Little Help from My Friends". He was also accompanied by Herringbone, an Ottawa band with whom he regularly practices. He received a standing ovation after providing the piano accompaniment and lead vocals for the song. Harper was part of a band called The Van Cats, a pun on "vingt-quatre" ("24" in French), referring to the prime ministerial residence of 24 Sussex Drive.

He was the first prime minister to employ a personal stylist, Michelle Muntean, whose duties ranged from coordinating his clothing to preparing his hair and makeup for speeches and television appearances. While she used to be on the public payroll, she has been paid for by the Conservative Party since "some time [in] 2007".

As of 2013, the Harper family had two cats, Stanley and Gypsy. They have fostered other cats as well.

Laureen's sister, Elan Harper, is a political strategist who won the Conservative nomination in Calgary Confederation in April 2026.

== Honours ==

Ribbon	Description	Notes
	Companion of the Order of Canada	2019: For his long-standing career in politics and for his service to the nation as the 22nd prime minister of Canada.
	Member of the Alberta Order of Excellence	2023: For his long-standing career in politics and for his service to the province of Alberta.
	Queen Elizabeth II Golden Jubilee Medal for Canada	2002: As the leader of the Official Opposition and a member of Parliament, Harper was awarded the medal as a member of the Canadian order of precedence.
	Queen Elizabeth II Diamond Jubilee Medal for Canada	2012: As the prime minister of Canada and as a member of Parliament, Harper was awarded the medal as a member of the Canadian order of precedence.
	Alberta Centennial Medal	2005; As a prominent Albertan, as a member of Parliament and in particular, leader of the Official Opposition, Harper was awarded with the Alberta Centennial Medal.

Harper received the Woodrow Wilson Award on October 6, 2006, for his public service in Calgary. The awards ceremony was held at the Telus Convention Centre in Calgary, the same place where he made his victory speech.

Time magazine also named him as Canada's Newsmaker of the Year in 2006. Stephen Handelman wrote "that the prime minister who was once dismissed as a doctrinaire backroom tactician with no experience in government has emerged as a warrior in power".

On June 27, 2008, Harper was awarded the Presidential Gold Medallion for Humanitarianism by B'nai B'rith International. He was the first Canadian to receive this medal.

On July 11, 2011, Harper was honoured by Alberta's Blood tribe. He was made Honorary Chief of the Kainai Nation during a ceremony, in which they recognized him for making an official apology on behalf of the Government of Canada for the residential schools abuse. Harper issued this apology in 2008. The chief of the tribe explained that he believes the apology officially started the healing and rebuilding of relations between the federal and native councils. Lester B. Pearson, John Diefenbaker, and Jean Chrétien are the only other prime ministers of Canada to have been awarded the same honorary title.

On September 27, 2012, Harper received the World Statesman of the Year award. This award was offered through a US group of various faith representatives. The award was presented at a black-tie banquet in New York. Jean Chrétien was one of the previous recipients from Canada.

In August 2016, President Petro Poroshenko of Ukraine awarded Stephen Harper with the highest award for foreigners—the Order of Liberty.

In December 2019, it was announced by Governor General Julie Payette that Harper had been appointed as a Companion of the Order of Canada. He was formally invested on September 18, 2022, by Governor General Mary Simon in London in a ceremony attended by incumbent prime minister Justin Trudeau, and former prime ministers Kim Campbell, Jean Chrétien, Paul Martin and former Governors-General Michaëlle Jean and David Johnston.

In 2023, he was appointed a Member of the Alberta Order of Excellence, the province's civilian honour for merit. In 2026, Harper received the Royal Canadian Geographical Society's gold medal.

== Honorary degrees ==
Honorary degrees

Location	Date	School	Degree
Israel	January 22, 2014	Tel Aviv University	Doctor of Philosophy (Ph.D)

== Published works ==
- A Great Game – Harper, Stephen J. (2013). A Great Game: The Forgotten Leafs and the Rise of Professional Hockey. Toronto: Simon & Schuster. ISBN 978-1-4767-1653-4. OCLC 857979705.
- Right Here, Right Now – Harper, Stephen J. (2018). Right Here, Right Now: Politics and Leadership in the Age of Disruption. Toronto: Signal. ISBN 978-0-7710-3862-4. OCLC 1039413914.
- Flags of Canada – Harper, Stephen J. (2025). Flags of Canada. Toronto: Sutherland House Books. ISBN 978-1-9983-6549-4. OCLC 1475304826.

== See also ==
- 28th Canadian Ministry The Harper cabinet
- List of prime ministers of Canada
- List of prime ministers of Elizabeth II
- Canada–United States softwood lumber dispute
- Conservative Party of Canada
- Reform Party of Canada
- Canadian Alliance
- Conservatism in Canada
- Canada's Global Markets Action Plan

== Notes ==
Parliament of Canada
Preceded by Jim Hawkes	Member of Parliament for Calgary West; 1993–1997	Succeeded by Rob Anders
Preceded by Preston Manning	Member of Parliament for Calgary Southwest; 2002–2015	Constituency abolished
New constituency	Member of Parliament for Calgary Heritage; 2015–2016	Succeeded by Bob Benzen
Party political offices
Preceded by John Reynolds; Interim	Leader of the Canadian Alliance; 2002–2003	Party dissolved
Preceded by John Lynch-Staunton; Interim	Leader of the Conservative Party; 2004–2015	Succeeded by Rona Ambrose; Interim
Political offices
Preceded by John Reynolds	Leader of the Opposition; 2002–2004	Succeeded by Grant Hill
Preceded by Grant Hill	Leader of the Opposition; 2004–2006	Succeeded by Bill Graham
Preceded by Paul Martin	Prime Minister of Canada; 2006–2015	Succeeded by Justin Trudeau
Diplomatic posts
Preceded by Silvio Berlusconi	Chairperson of the Group of 8; 2010	Succeeded by Nicolas Sarkozy
Preceded by Barack Obama	Chairperson of the Group of 20; 2010	Succeeded by Lee Myung-bak
Order of precedence
Preceded by Paul Martin as Former prime minister	Canadian order of precedence as Former prime minister	Succeeded by Justin Trudeau as Former prime minister
