= Kenneth Whyte =

Canadian journalist and author (born 1960)

Kenneth Whyte (born August 12, 1960) is a Canadian journalist, publisher and author based in Toronto. He was formerly the Senior Vice-President of Public Policy for Rogers Communications and chair of the Donner Canadian Foundation.

== Early life and career ==
Born in Winnipeg, Manitoba, Whyte grew up in Edmonton, Alberta. He began his career in journalism as reporter at the Sherwood Park News and joined Alberta Report as a reporter in 1984, serving as executive editor of the magazine starting in 1986. In 1994, Whyte was appointed editor of Saturday Night, a monthly magazine. In 1998, he was named editor-in-chief of the National Post, a new conservative national newspaper. In 2003, Whyte and several other executives were dismissed from the National Post as part of a restructuring by new ownership. He became a visiting scholar at McGill University where he was co-founder of the McGill Observatory in Media and Public Policy, and a trustee of the McGill Institute for the Study of Canada.

=== Rogers ===
In 2005, Whyte joined Maclean's at the start of its 100th year of publication. Whyte was named the Canadian Journalism Foundation’s newsperson of the year in 2008. Maclean's was noted during his tenure for its controversial, tabloid covers, including an exposé of political corruption in Quebec that was unanimously denounced by Canada's House of Commons, and an excerpt of Mark Steyn's America Alone, which touched off several failed actions against the magazines in provincial and federal human rights commissions.

In 2009, while still editing and publishing Maclean’s, Whyte also took over the publisher's title at Chatelaine magazine, traditionally Canada's largest women's title. During his first year at the magazine, its circulation dropped below its main competitor Canadian Living for the first time in its history. Whyte hired Jane Francisco as editor and the two of them engineered a turnaround over the next four years.

In 2011, Whyte became president of Rogers Publishing Limited, which owned fifty-five magazines, including Chatelaine, Today's Parent, Canadian Business, Moneysense, and Hello! Canada. At the end of 2013, Rogers entered into a partnership with Hearst, Time Inc., Meredith, and Condé Nast to create Next Issue Media (now Texture). Whyte left Rogers to become the founding president of Next Issue Canada and a director of Next Issue globally.

=== Published books ===
In 2008, Whyte's non-fiction book, The Uncrowned King: The Sensational Rise of William Randolph Hearst was published in Canada, and the following year in the U.S. It was a finalist for the 2009 National Business Book Award, the British Columbia National Award for Canadian Non-Fiction, the Charles Taylor Prize, and the Los Angeles Times Book Award for biography. It was also a Washington Post book of the year. His second book, a biography of Herbert Hoover, was published by Random House/Knopf in 2017. It was a finalist for the National Book Critics Circle Award in 2017. In 2021, Knopf published The Sack of Detroit: General Motors and the End of American Enterprise, which is an account of the rise and subsequent decline of General Motors and the automotive industry. In this book, Whyte attributes the industry decline to what he believes was an excessively regulated business environment that developed following Ralph Nader's activism for the promotion of automobile safety.

=== Sutherland House Books ===
In 2018, Whyte announced he was forming Sutherland House Books, a non-fiction publishing house that began releasing books in 2019. Authors who have published works under Sutherland House Books include author and journalist Jon Kay, psychologist and academic Michael Ungar, author and historian Conrad Black, cultural critic Sam Forster, and the "urban fixer" Joe Berridge. Others include, Jennifer Hosten, Alex Johnston, Trilby Kent, Judith Kalman, Ira Wells, Eric Reguly, Allen Abel among others.

In 2022, Sutherland House announced the launch of Sutherland Quarterly a series of current affairs books by leading writers that are sold in bookstores and also can be purchased by annual subscription.

In 2025, Sutherland House acquired Fitzhenry & Whiteside, adding 1,400 titles to its catalogue.

=== Other involvements ===
In 2016–2017, Whyte was appointed to the Canadian government's expert advisory panel on cultural policy. A governor of the Donner Canadian Foundation for more than twenty years, Whyte succeeded Allan Gotlieb as chairman of the foundation in 2016. He is also a director of the Canadian Chamber of Commerce. He has served as a senior fellow of Massey College at the University of Toronto, an adviser to the Cundill Prize Foundation, and a governor of the Aurea Foundation. He is a senior fellow at the C.D. Howe Institute, a life-time honorary alumnus of McGill University, and a former board member of the McGill Institute for the Study of Canada. In the spring of 2017, Whyte, in response to Hal Niedzviecki's editorial in Write magazine, initiated the "appropriation prize" in support of authors writing from points of view other than their own. The "prize" was controversial in the Indigenous literature community.
