= Domestic policy of the Stephen Harper government =

Several policies regarding interior and domestic issues in Canada were planned and adopted by the Cabinet of Canadian Prime Minister Stephen Harper, after he came to office as the head of a minority government on February 6, 2006. At the beginning of the government's appointment, five policy priorities were identified in the areas of federal accountability, tax reform, crime, child care and health care.

== Economic policy ==
=== Tax policy ===
A major policy goal of Stephen Harper was to reduce taxes. During his 10 years in government, Harper reduced income taxes, corporate taxes, and the GST. His cuts were both progressive and regressive.

==== Goods and services tax ====
On July 1, 2006, the Government of Canada reduced the Goods and services tax by 1 percentage point (to 6%), as promised by the Conservative Party of Canada in the 2006 Canadian federal election campaign. They again lowered it to 5%, effective January 1, 2008. This reduction was included in the Final 2007 Budget Implementation Bill (Bill C-28), which received Royal Assent on December 14, 2007. This change has been estimated to have decreased government revenues by approximately $6 billion. Opponents of these tax decreases cited that sales taxes target those who spend more and therefore such reductions disproportionately benefit Canadians giving those who have the most and spend the most the largest tax decrease. Lost government revenues from these cuts amount to about $13.3 Billion Canadian dollars.

==== Income taxes ====
During his tenure as prime minister, Stephen Harper reduced income taxes. Looking at raw numbers, most of the benefits of these cuts went to the wealthiest Canadians, yet these changes generally made Canada's tax code more progressive. Lost government revenues from these cuts amount to about $17.1 billion Canadian dollars.

==== Working income tax benefit ====
The Working Income Tax Benefit is a refundable tax credit in Canada introduced in the 2007 Canadian federal budget, similar to the Earned Income Tax Credit (EITC) in the United States. It offers tax relief to working low-income individuals and encourages others to enter the workforce.

==== Corporate taxes ====
Under Stephen Harper, Canada's general corporate taxes reduced from 22% to 15%. Canada's corporate tax rate thus became one of the lowest in the world, and substantially lower than its top marginal tax rate for individuals. At the same time, Canada's small business tax rate reduced from 12% to 11%.

=== Fiscal imbalance ===
During the 2006 campaign, Stephen Harper promised the provinces, including Quebec and Ontario, to deal with the issue of fiscal imbalance. When the 2006 budget was announced, there was commitment to deal with the matter, but little money was used for it. No funding was used when Finance Minister Jim Flaherty announced a $13 billion surplus. The Bloc Québécois threatened to topple the government if the Tories did not give an additional $3.9 billion to Quebec. Support for the Conservatives in Quebec was up during the 2006 election campaign due to Harper's promise to deal with the matter.

On January 16, 2007, an article in a Montreal newspaper, La Presse, reported that the federal government would give an additional $1.5 billion in transfer payments with another $500 million for post-secondary education and infrastructures.

Several premiers from other provinces criticized the plan. Saskatchewan Finance Minister Andy Thompson asserted that the government was using revenues from the oil industry of the West to gain votes in Quebec.

During the 2007 budget, on March 19, 2007, Flaherty announced an extra $2.3 billion will go to Quebec, while some provinces will get extra money for social policies. In July 2008, a Crown share dispute over oil royalties was resolved with Nova Scotia getting a total of $870 million.

Following a meeting with all premiers after the 2008 election, the federal government removed Newfoundland and Labrador from its list of provinces receiving equalization payments due to revenues from its offshore oil platform Hibernia. In contrast, the federal government added Ontario due to its struggling auto industry and which will receive $347 million while Quebec will receive over $8 billion starting in January 2009.

=== Response to the Great Recession ===
In 2009, Stephen Harper announced a series of budgetary measures aimed at curtailing the effects of the Great Recession in Canada. These measures were marketed as "Canada's Economic Action Plan". Some of the key items in the Economic Action Plan budget were: $12 billion in new infrastructure stimulus funding for roads, bridges, broadband internet access, electronic health records, laboratories and border crossings across the country, $20 billion in personal income tax relief, $7.8 billion to build quality housing, stimulate construction and enhance energy efficiency, and many other projects. The Economist magazine stated that Canada had come out the recession stronger than any other rich country in the G7.

=== Financial Services ===
==== Registered Disability Savings Plan ====
In Budget 2007, Flaherty introduced the Registered Disability Savings Plan (RDSP). The RDSP is a long-term savings plan to help Canadians with disabilities and their families save. The RDSP resembles its other saving counterparts, the RRSP and the RESP, and is meant to ensure a secure future for people with disabilities. The Government assists these families by contributing through grants and bonds that supplement contributions.

==== Tax-Free Savings Account ====
In Budget 2008, Flaherty introduced the Tax-Free Savings Account (TFSA), a flexible, registered, general-purpose savings vehicle that allows Canadians to earn tax-free investment income to more easily meet lifetime savings needs.

The measure, which came into effect on January 2, 2009, has clear differences with the Registered Retirement Savings Plan (RRSP). There is a tax deduction for contributions to an RRSP, and withdrawals of contributions and investment income are all taxable. In contrast, there are no tax deductions for contributions to a TFSA. Beginning in 2013, contribution room in the TFSA has increased to $5,500 per calendar year. The Canada Revenue Agency describes the difference between the TFSA and an RRSP as follows: "An RRSP is primarily intended for retirement. The TFSA is like an RRSP for everything else in your life."

Flaherty's measure was supported by many organizations, including the C.D. Howe Institute, which stated: "This tax policy gem is very good news for Canadians, and Mr. Flaherty and his government deserve credit for a novel program."

=== Canada's Global Markets Action Plan ===
In 2013, Harper's government launched the Global Markets Action Plan to generate employment opportunities for Canadians by expanding Canadian businesses and investment in other countries in a highly competitive global environment.

==== Small and Medium-sized Enterprises (SMEs) ====
In March 2015, Harper permitted a $50 million financial assistance over a period of five years to facilitate the Canadian small and medium-sized enterprises (SMEs) on market research and participating trade missions; the funding would help approximately 500 to 1000 entrepreneurs in Canada yearly to reach their full export capacity.

==== Trade Commissioner Service ====
Harper extended another $42 million over five years to enhance the Canadian Trade Commissioner Service, with $9.2 million per year thereafter. The funding would facilitate the expanded trade services: Canada opened four new trade offices in China, bringing the total number of offices there to 15, with more than 100 trade commissioners; and it strengthened its support network in India, where there are eight offices and nearly 50 trade commissioners. There were more than 25 trade commissioners being trained placing in number of business associations in order to gain better understanding of the Canadian exports.

=== Abolition of the penny ===
On March 29, 2012, the Harper government announced in its budget that it would withdraw the penny from circulation in the fall of 2012, citing the 1.6 cent cost to produce it. The final penny was minted at the RCM's Winnipeg, Manitoba, plant on the morning of May 4, 2012, and was later entrusted to the Bank of Canada Museum in Ottawa. Existing pennies will remain legal tender indefinitely; however, pennies were withdrawn from circulation on February 4, 2013. On February 4, 2013, the Mint began melting down the estimated 35 billion pennies that were in circulation.

=== Fiscal management ===
Prior to Stephen Harper taking office in November 2006, during the last two years of the premiership of Paul Martin, the Canadian economy was experiencing steady growth and there were large fiscal surpluses—$1.4 billion in FY 2004-2005 (0.1% of GDP) and $13.2 billion in FY 2005-2006 (0.9% GDP). Harper became Prime Minister in the fall of 2006, and in FY 2006–2007, the Harper government posted a fiscal surplus of $13.9 billion. In FY 2007-2008 the surplus was $9.6 billion (0.6% GDP). During the period that included the 2008 financial crisis and the Great Recession affecting global economies, Harper's government reported five straight budgetary deficits—$55.6 billion in FY 2009-2010 (-3.6% GDP), $33.4 billion in FY 2010–2011, $18.4 billion in FY 2012–2013, and $5.2 billion in FY 2013–2014.

The CPC's 2012 budget included a plan to return to a balanced budget. In their last year in office, a number of factors complicated efforts to succeed in reducing the deficit in order to achieve a balanced budget by April 2015. Against the backdrop of a volatile national economy in Canada caused by a steep decline in global oil prices during the winter of 2014–2015, as of January 15, 2015, CPC Finance Minister, Joe Oliver, announced that the presentation of the federal budget for FY 2015–2016 to the House of Commons of Canada, the last budget in Harper's premiership, would be postponed. In his announcement, Oliver pledged a balanced budget and a potential surplus of approximately $1.6 billion. The previous prediction reported in the CPC's spring 2014 finance release, showed that the federal government "was on track for a $7.5-billion surplus 11 months into 2015-16." The federal fiscal year runs from April 1 to March 31 and Justin Trudeau replaced Harper as Prime Minister in October 2015. The Annual Financial Report 2015-2016 under the new government adjusted this projected surplus to a deficit of $1.0 billion by the end of March 2016.

The FY2015-2016 deficit was retroactively adjusted to $2.9 billion to reflect significant changes made in the methodology used by the Auditor General of Canada to accounts for the Government's unfunded pension obligations which affected both the size of the deficit and the percentages of GDP reported. A May 2018 C. D. Howe Institute report, said that prior to these changes in accounting practices, the burden to taxpayers had been understated.

In 2008, debt-to-GDP ratio was 28% with a total federal debt of $458 billion. In 2010, Canada, which had a debt-to-GDP ratio of 77%, was the lowest of all the G7 economies with the United States at 98% and Japan at 227%. Canada's total federal debt continued to increase after the 2008 financial crisis. The debt-to-GDP ratio, increased to 33% in 2013, and then began a slight decline.

=== Federal Budgets ===
Of the nine budgets presented to the Canadian Parliament under Stephen Harper, six reported a deficit.

- 2006 Canadian federal budget
- 2007 Canadian federal budget
- 2008 Canadian federal budget
- 2009 Canadian federal budget
- 2010 Canadian federal budget
- 2011 Canadian federal budget (presented in March 2011 and again in June).
- 2012 Canadian federal budget
- 2013 Canadian federal budget
- 2014 Canadian federal budget
- 2015 Canadian federal budget

== Public service ==
Stephen Harper described his relationship with the public servants as tense. In 2007, he told CBC interviewer Rex Murphy "Probably the most difficult job, you know, practical difficult thing you have to learn as a prime minister and ministers, our ministers as well, is dealing with the federal bureaucracy. He added "It’s walking that fine line of, of being a positive leader of the federal public service, but at the same time pushing them and not becoming captive to them . . . I could write a book on that one".

In 2013, former director-general with Citizenship and Immigration Canada Andrew Griffith wrote that "Under the Harper government, one of the main challenges for the public service was having its knowledge and expertise put into question". Griffith noted cultural differences between the more liberal-oriented public servants and an ideologically driven conservative governments. Griffith also said that the government's short term political agenda clashed with the public service's long-term planning.

He related his experience working with the then-minister of immigration Jason Kenney, who changed the working culture of his department to the dismay of most of his co-workers. Indeed, Kenney intended to use his department to build the Conservative Party's base, and his minister's office frequently intervened in the works of the department employees, requiring them to take into consideration the minister's outreach to various communities. Under previous ministers, these considerations tended to be ignored.

=== Phoenix pay system ===
Stephen Harper introduced the Phoenix pay system as part of his 2009 Transformation of Pay Administration Initiative, to replace Canada's 40-year old system with a new improved, cost-saving "automated, off-the-shelf commercial system." In June 2011, IBM won the sole-source contract to set up the system, using PeopleSoft software, the original contract was for $5.7 million, but IBM was eventually paid $185 million. According to The New York Times, Oracle Corporation's PeopleSoft software system was "widely used by corporations and institutions to manage operations, finances and employees." In March 2014, according to an IBM spokeswoman, the Crown took over responsibility for "training design and execution" from IBM," in a cost-saving measure. The government adopted a 'train the trainer' approach rather than follow IBM's recommended system.

Prior to 2012, about 2,000 pay advisors/specialists in 101 federal departments and agencies "processed pay, advised employees, and corrected errors" in scattered locations. When the new Miramichi Public Service Pay Centre was opened in May 2012, the PSPC began to eliminate pay advisor positions in 46 individual departments and agencies and replace them with "460 pay advisors and 90 support staff" at new centralized location in Pay Centre. By 2016, the PSPC had cut 1,200 pay advisor positions. Following centralization, these departments and agencies administrators no longer had "direct access to the new pay system." There were an additional 55 departments and agencies who maintained about approximately 800 pay advisors who continued to enter pay information for their own employees in the new Phoenix system.

In May 2015, IBM made the recommendation that government delay its planned rollout of Phoenix due to critical problems. In June 2015, before Phoenix was launched, some federal employees complained about not being paid, and there were reports that the Miramichi pay centre employees were overwhelmed. The Auditor General's May 29, 2018 report "Building and Implementing the Phoenix Pay System" found that in June 2015, Public Services and Procurement Canada cancelled a pilot to test Phoenix in a single department to assess whether Phoenix was ready for government wide use.

By 2018, Phoenix has caused pay problems to over 50 percent of the federal government's 290,000 public servants through underpayments, over-payments, and non-payments. The Office of the Auditor General (OAG) conducted two reports, one if 2017 and another in 2018 reviewing the Phoenix Pay System—a payroll processing system for Canadian federal government employees that is run by Public Services and Procurement Canada (PSPC) which has been controversial for a number of years— The 2018 report said that the Phoenix system was an "'incomprehensible failure' of project management and oversight."

== Agriculture ==
=== Aid for farmers ===
In the 2006 budget, the Conservatives announced an immediate $1.5 billion aid to farmers for the Grains and Oilseeds Payment Program. Agriculture Minister Chuck Strahl also announced in July $550 million in aid to low-income farmers with a two-year pilot project

On March 9, 2007, the government announced $1 billion in funding for farmers that would include payments to ease effects of high production costs and for various income programs.

=== Wheat Board ===
Strahl also planned to review the roles of the Canadian Wheat Board, a monopoly in the Canadian wheat industry. He wanted to end the "single desk" system which causes the monopoly, despite the opposition of farmers which supported the current role of the board.

== Social policy ==
=== Age of consent ===
The Conservative government raised the legal age of consent to 16 years. The rationale given by Justice minister Vic Toews for the change was to protect youth against sexual predators. The Tackling Violent Crime Act took effect on May 1, 2008, making the age of consent 16. A close-in-age exemption allows teenagers aged 14 and 15 to engage in sexual acts with partners who are less than 5 years older than them. Before this law, the age of consent was 14 (it had been set at 14 in 1890, before that date it was 12).

=== Same-sex marriage ===
During the 2006 election campaign, Stephen Harper promised a free vote to revisit the issue of same-sex marriage which had been legalized in 2005 by the previous government. The vote took place on December 7, 2006: the government bill to change the status quo was rejected 175 to 123. Afterwards Harper told the media that he now considered the issue to be closed and that he would not pursue further legislation on the matter.

There were also plans to pass a law that would protect "freedom of religious expression", a law interpreted by some as a shield for opponents of same-sex marriage. The government cut funding to various social programs and festivals, some of which were related to the gay community such as Montreal's Black and Blue Festival, one of the biggest gay festivals in Canada. The Harper government also reduced spending for women's advocacy work on the status of women in the country.

=== Child-care policy ===
In the 2006 budget, the Tories introduced a new child care allowance that gives parents with children under six years of age an allowance of $1200 per year, which is taxable in the hands of the lower income parent. The allowance is not tied to actual child care expenses, and is available to all parents, regardless of whether or not they use childcare services. The measures have cost the government about $3.7 billion per year. This plan replaced the Liberal government's plan announced in the 2005 budget under Paul Martin who committed $5 billion over five years to enhance and expand early learning and child care in collaboration with provinces and territories. After March 2007, the newly elected Conservatives under Stephen Harper eliminated the bilateral agreements as their first act of power. The child care plan agreements were based on Quebec's universal child care model and had been signed under Paul Martin's Liberal government with several provinces in 2005. The plan was cancelled when they took office and was replaced by the Universal Child Care Benefit (UCCB) $100-a-month cheques for parents with young children with promised tax credits for private or profit care and up to $250 million annually to create child care spaces across the country.

In September 2006, Minister Diane Finley, announced the creation of a Ministerial Advisory Committee on the Government of Canada's Child Care Spaces Initiative that would provide advice on the approach and mechanisms needed to create child care spaces and allocate the $250 million promised. Contrary to the recommendations of the report, to increase the supply of quality child care spaces and make child care more affordable for working parents, the Conservatives redirected the $250 million a year it had set aside for the Community Child Care Investment Program to provincial and territorial governments. And while Harper stated, that his government will work with provincial and local governments, not-for-profit organizations, and employers to create additional spaces, key national child care organizations such as the Canadian Child Care Federation, show no funding or program activity in their annual reports from federal departments. Since 2008, child care and early childhood development non-profits such as Invest in Kids, the Council for Early Childhood Development and Child Care Human Resources Sector Council have all closed doors after decades of operation.

=== Poverty and homelessness ===
On December 19, 2006, the government announced $526 million of funding to tackle poverty and homelessness in Canada with $270 million for the Homelessness Partnering Strategy and $246 million for Canada Mortgage and Housing Corporation. It will provide funding for refurbishing and renovating low-income homes, as well as improving access for homeless people to various services and supports such as health and substance abuse treatment programs. Prior to the announcement, activists protested at Human Resources and Social Services Minister Diane Finley's offices in Ottawa.

The federal government's Homelessness Partnering Strategy implements the Housing First projects undertaken across Canada.

=== Aboriginals ===
The Conservative Party tabled about $9 billion for aboriginals in 2006–2007 but with few measures announced in the 2007 budget. On March 22, 2007, a private bill was tabled in the House of Commons demanding an additional $5.1 billion for First Nations health, education and housing. The motion was adopted 176 to 126 with mainly Conservative members voting against. Indian Affairs Minister Jim Prentice mentioned that it will ignore the motion that would have forced the government to implement measures in order to respect the Kelowna Accord which was concluded by the Liberals in 2005 prior to the 2006 elections and supported by former Progressive Conservative Prime Minister Brian Mulroney. The Accord was supposed to give First Nations better health care, education and housing, but it lacked specific implementation details. In the 2008 budget, $330 million was announced for improving access to safe drinking water in First Nations Reserves with funding for economic improvement, services and health programs.

On June 11, 2008, Harper made a speech at the House of Commons in which he issued an official apology to the First Nation groups in regard to a residential school abuse in which children were isolated from their homes, families and cultures for a century. Opposition leaders also issued apologies. Harper admitted the responsibility of the wrongdoing of the government: "The Government of Canada now recognizes it was wrong to forcibly remove children from their homes... to separate children from rich and vibrant traditions"

=== Veterans ===
The Conservatives' 2007 budget included $19 million to introduce an ombudsman's office and Veterans' Bill of Rights. In April 2007, Harper and Minister of Veterans Affairs Greg Thompson told the press in Kitchener, Ontario that the bill of rights would come into effect soon. $282 million were announced in the 2008 budget to support war veterans. The CPC, under Prime Minister Stephen Harper, has incrementally increased the annual budget of Veterans Affairs Canada from $2.8 billion in 2006 to $3.64 billion over an 8-year period.

=== Apology to Chinese-Canadians ===
On June 23, 2006, Stephen Harper offered full apology to Chinese Canadians for the country's treatment of Chinese immigrants during the years 1885 to 1923 on the imposing Head Tax policy to them, and subsequent discrimination policies, including subsequent exclusion of Chinese immigrants from 1923 until 1947. It is estimated about 82,000 Chinese paid the fee, first set at $50 and later raised to $500, about two years' wages at the time. For many years, the federal government refused to apologize, citing the possibilities of legal liabilities.

Harper said that Chinese-Canadians who paid the tax or their surviving spouses will receive a symbolic $20,000 ex-gratia payment.

=== Consumer product safety ===
Following a series of products consumer due to safety and health concerns in 2007, the government adopted a series of measures to enhance and improve consumer product safety laws. In the new Canada Consumer Product Safety Act as well as amendments to the Food and Drug Act, measures included developing tighter manufacturing standards, mandatory reports by industries on any injuries, deaths or other problems on various products as well as more authority by the government to mandate recalls on various products. The government also announced higher fines for industries failing to the new laws as well as the increase number of inspections and inspectors.

=== Bill C-10 ===
In late-February 2008, the government announced its intention on amending the Income Tax Act which would suspend any tax credits to any film or television production which would include content judging too offensive to the general public. The Canadian Family Action Coalition had pushed the federal government for the funding cuts and is supported by the Ontario Progressive Conservative Party citing that governments should be careful about putting taxpayers money for movies with too much sexual content. The bill was met with opposition by the Alliance of Canadian Cinema, Television and Radio Artists citing it has grave implication to the actors while calling it morally offensive to modern Canadian society. Canadian Actress Sarah Polley, added that the bill would amount to "censorship" and that the definition of offensive is "extremely vague and dangerous to be using". MP Jim Abbott cited that "the bill does nothing to obstruct filmmakers – it just stops the government from footing bills for films that don't fall in line with Canadians' morals". Similar legislation was unanimously passed in 2003. Director Ang Lee has also spoken out on bill C-10. He stated that "People should be free to say anything," though he himself has never been censored even under the Chinese film boards strict review process.

=== Immigration ===
In March 2008 as part of the annual budget, the government introduced several laws to amend the Immigration and Refugee Protection Act. The changes would have helped to streamline immigrant application back-up, to speed up application for skilled workers and to rapidly reject other ones that are judged not admissible by immigration officers. Immigrant applications had risen to a high of 500,000, creating a delay of up to six months for an application to be processed. The bill also provided more power to the Minister to set limits on the types of immigrants that can have their application processed. The government added that the reforms would have provided more skilled workers to the country. The opposition members criticized the measures because it would shut the door on immigrants while giving the Minister too much power to decide on who can enter Canada and others not. Trinity—Spadina MP Olivia Chow had proposed an amendment to remove the measures as part of the budget. Immigration Minister Diane Finley stated that the current government helped process applications 20 to 40 percent faster than before the measures were announced.

In 2011, Canada admitted a record-high number of immigrants last year, with more than 280,600 new permanent residents. That's the highest number admitted into the country in 57 years.

=== Bill C-70 ===
In early 2008, Conservative MP Ken Epp tabled private member's bill C-484 in which harming a fetus would constitute a crime. Opponents of the bill, including medical specialists in Quebec, alleged that the bill would open the door for an abortion ban. The bill passed first reading in March 2008 with the support of the opposition.

However, Harper has indicated that he did not wish to re-open the abortion debate.

=== Official languages ===
In June 2008, Josée Verner (then the Minister responsible for Official Languages) announced that the government would invest about $1.1 billion until 2013 to promote the official languages in the Roadmap for Canada's Linguistic Duality 2008-2013. The plan was to facilitate cultural minority groups, most notably in education and health. Part of the plan comprised recommendations made by former New Brunswick Premier Bernard Lord in a report on the state of official languages in Canada. The government also announced the support program for official languages which replaced an older judiciary program. The programme was followed by the Roadmap for Canada's Official Languages 2013-2018: Education, Immigration, Communities.

=== Education ===
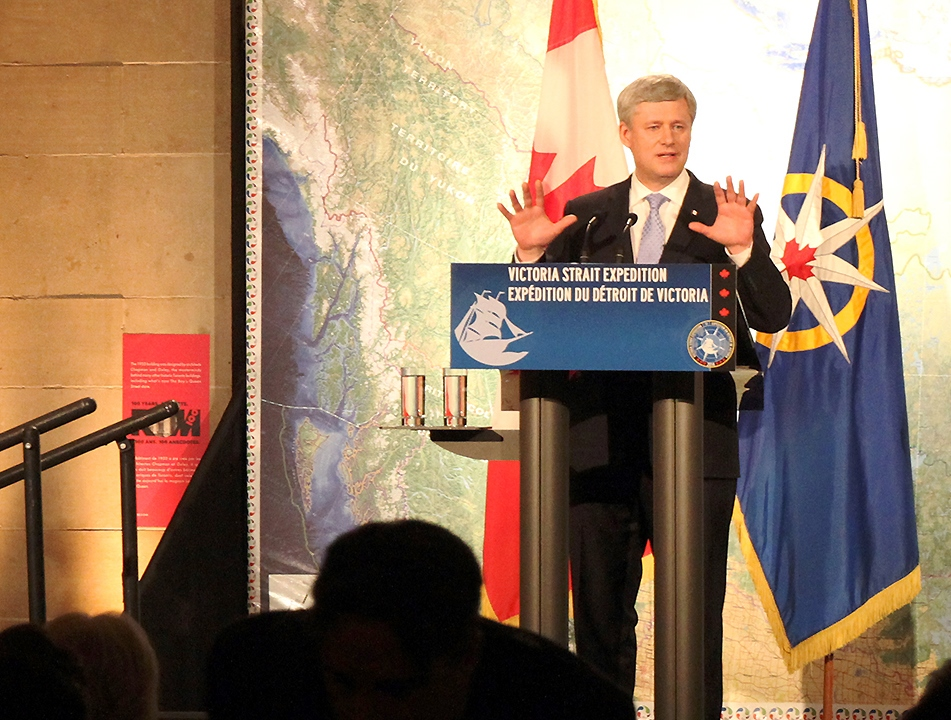
Harper appearing at a gala to celebrate the discovery of HMS Erebus, one of two ships wrecked during John Franklin's lost expedition, at the Royal Ontario Museum in Toronto

During the 2008 federal budget, the government announced the creation of a new $350 million Student Grant Program for post-secondary students. The plan replaced the Millennium Scholarship Fund introduced in the late 1990s. Additional funding was announced for improvement other programs such as Canadian Student Loan Program.

=== Auto industry crisis ===
Following a $17 billion bailout announcement from the US government on December 19, 2007, the Canadian government announced the following day a $2.7 billion aid to the auto industry including General Motors and Chrysler. The Ontario government also contributed to $1.3 billion for the industry which has been hit hard by the recent economic downtown initially due to record oil prices which resulted in a sharp drop in the sales of new vehicles, including pick-up trucks and SUVs. The lower demand resulted in massive layoffs and production shutdown at several plants across southern Ontario in addition to plants across the US. Harper told at a press conference on the announcement: "This industry, the three automakers, need serious restructuring We are doing this on the assumption that, obviously, we cannot afford—United States or Canada—a short-term catastrophic collapse, but on the other hand we're doing this with the knowledge that the automakers must change their way of doing business in a very serious way and must bring their products and their costs in line with the marketplace".

=== Arts and Culture cuts ===
Prior to the start of the 2008 election campaign, Minister Josee Verner announced $45 million in cutbacks to arts and cultural programs. Harper explained that ordinary Canadians cannot relate to "rich galas" where artists complain about their subsidies. He also noted that the overall budget of Canadian Heritage has climbed eight per cent." Many actors across the country had criticized the move citing that the arts and culture industries represent over 1.1 million jobs in Canada and contributes to about $86 billion to its gross domestic product.

The Conservatives only elected 10 MPs in Quebec where the opposition against the cuts was the most imposing. It also prevented them from winning a majority government for the second straight election. James Moore who replaced Verner as Heritage Minister following the election stated that he had no plans to cancel the cutbacks citing the decisions made were in the past but added that there will be opportunities in the future to view the spending.

== Interior security ==
=== Transit security ===
On November 14, 2006, Transport Minister Lawrence Cannon announced an immediate $37 million investment on improving security in public transit systems across the country. Cannon said that transit systems are not immune to terrorist attacks like those that hit Madrid, London and Mumbai over the past two years. Toronto and Montreal received $11 million each, Ottawa $1.2 million while Vancouver, Edmonton and Calgary also received a certain amount. The money will be used for security plans, public awarenesses and training. The Toronto Transit Commission and OC Transpo requested that the money would be spent on installing cameras inside buses. Subsequently, it was revealed that while 40% of all transit users in Canada use the TTC, and 85% of Toronto transit riders use the TTC, it will only receive $1.46 million, with the remaining grant used for GO Transit and Union Station.

=== Crime policy ===
The government promised to be tough on crime by imposing tougher sentences to people committing firearm offenses and violent crimes; a promise made by Harper after a record number of deaths by gun-related incidents in Toronto in 2005. They are also on the process of creating a new law that would impose tougher sentences for repeat crime offenders, eliminating house arrest or conditional sentences of offenders and a legislation targeting impaired drivers and street racing. Several anti-crime bills were progressing in the House but failed to pass the Senate as a new Throne Speech was announced for October 2007 in which several of the measures were re-announced. The new bill, called the Tackling Violent Crime Act (or Bill C-2), consisted of five bills many of them from cancelled legislations and included measures the age of consent, repeat and violent offenders. A confidence motion on the bill was tabled and passed the House 172–27 on February 12, 2008, as all Liberal MPs abstained from voting. The motion is set to presented at the Senate in March 2008

On October 4, 2007, the government announced a new national drug plan, that would include mandatory jail sentences for drug trafficking offenses. In addition, the government announced funding for treatment and prevention, including a Prevention Campaign Program for youth. The government pledged about $64 million to fund the drug plan, and characterized the new policy as a balance between prevention and punishment. In 2006, the Conservatives had annulled a bill introduced by the Liberals which would have decriminalized possession of small amounts of cannabis. Cannabis-related arrests have increased significantly since.

In the 2008 budget, the government announced $400 million to help set up a Recruitment Fund in which it will help all provinces and territories to hire as much 2 500 police officers while additional funding was announced for jails.

On April 14, 2008, in Winnipeg, Manitoba, the government introduced new legislatures in regards to car theft. The news laws would make it illegal to tamper with vehicle identification numbers, would target organized group specialized in car and parts theft, chop shops and stolen property trafficking. According to the government, auto thefts are costing about $1.6 billion to Canadians. The city of Winnipeg has the highest number of cars stolen per population.

On February 26, 2009, the government announced in Vancouver, a new anti-gang legislation that would make gang-killing a first degree murder offense with mandatory minimum sentences for drive-by shootings of 4 years in prison except for 5 years if committed on behalf of a gang organization. In the weeks prior to the new bill, there were 18 shootings related to a gang war in the Greater Vancouver Area. Stiffer sentences of at least 14 years in jail for aggravated assault and assault with a weapon against a police officer were also announced. The following day, Justice Minister Rob Nicholson also announced minimum mandatory sentences for drug dealers and traffickers. According to the Controlled Drugs and Substances Act, one-year sentences would be given for marijuana drug dealing linked to organized crime, two-year sentences for hard drugs trafficking as well as a maximum of 14 years in prison for big pot grow-ups. Ironically, despite Stephen Harper's opposition to marijuana culture, in his last 3 years there has been more marijuana produced than any other time in Canada's history.

=== Gun registry ===
Since in power, the Conservatives had announced their intentions of significantly reforming or even abolishing the gun registry program implemented in 1995 citing the cost overruns of hundreds of million of dollars while the Tories also criticized the effectiveness of the registry to track every gun as well as being a nuisance for firearm owners. He added that: "Duck-hunters, farmers and law-abiding gun owners do not pose a threat to Canadians, criminals do". A report conducted by Auditor General Sheila Fraser estimated the costs at nearly $1 billion for the first 10 years of its implementation.

On June 19, 2006, the Conservatives introduced the bill to eliminate the program though it did not pass the House vote. It was re-introduced on November 16, 2007, but the motion failed again. On April 1, 2009, the Conservatives had planned to re-introduced again the legislation but in the Senate.

While not succeeding in abolishing the program, the government did reform part of the registry. Among the changes made by the Conservatives to the registry, it eliminated within the scope of the registry long guns such as rifles and shotguns, a move that expected to affect up to 320,000 people. It also waived some license fees and extended registry deadlines for long gun owners. Ontario's attorney general Michael Bryant had criticized the amnesty move in 2007 accusing Ottawa of being "in the holster of the gun lobby. By 2008, the federal government had refunded up to $21 million in license fees to 340 000 gun owners.

Supporters of keeping the gun registry cited that better gun controls would prevent events such as the Dawson College shooting in 2006 and the Ecole Polytechnique massacre in 1989. One of the victims of the Dawson shooting also challenged Harper for a debate on gun control. Among the groups opposed to the Conservatives plan included the Canadian Auto Workers and the Quebec Women's Federation. A study from Swiss research group, Graduate Institute of International Studies, also cited, in a report called Small Arms Survey 2006, that maintaining the gun registry was more cost effective saving Canada up to $1.4 billion a year in costs associated with gun violence while citing a sharp decrease in the number of gun deaths and injuries.

During the 41st Parliament the newly formed Conservative majority government again introduced legislation to repeal the requirement to register non-restricted firearms and to destroy the registry database. Bill C-19 passed both the House and Senate and received royal assent on April 5, 2012.

== Infrastructure ==
Stephen Harper was concerned with improving Canada's infrastructure. His 2009 budget included $12 billion in new infrastructure stimulus funding for roads, bridges, broadband internet access, laboratories and border crossings across the country.

=== Public transit ===
In 2006, Harper administration invested over $5 billion towards public transit projects in Canada. In 2006, the federal government provided $697 million towards the York-University-Spadina Subway Extension. On March 6, 2007, the government announced over $1.5 billion in funding in Ontario for improving the city of Toronto's transit system including the extension of a subway line to Vaughan. $586 million of the funding went for a new power grid from Ontario to Manitoba that would provide cleaner hydro energy. In September 2013, former finance minister Jim Flaherty invested a federal contribution of $660 million towards the Scarborough subway extension.

In the 2006 budget, the government introduced a 15.25% tax-credit on monthly passes for transit users. Harper also announced a $300 million grant to the Greater Vancouver Transportation Authority which will be used in part for preparations for the 2010 Olympic Winter Games.

The government also secured $200 million of funding for Ottawa's O-Train expansion project after Treasury Board President John Baird reviewed the project to make sure there were no cost overruns. The money was secured after Ottawa's new council voted on the project. However, in November, Nepean—Carleton MP Pierre Poilievre announced that, despite opposition from most of Ottawa City Council, $35 million of the transit funding was to be diverted for a new Rideau River bridge crossings between the two Ottawa growing suburban communities, Barrhaven and Riverside South. Poilievre had stated that if the city of Ottawa would present a transit plan, a request to the government for new money for public transit projects will be granted. Ontario Premier Dalton McGuinty stated that no provincial money will be given to the bridge project if no rapid transit corridor is included.

=== Infrastructure deals ===
In July 2008, the government concluded an infrastructure deal with Ontario until 2014 worth over $3 billion. Much of the funding would be used mostly for infrastructure repairs and upgrades including the Trans-Canada Highway as well as for rapid transit projects in the Kitchener-Waterloo area and broadband coverage in rural areas of eastern Ontario.

=== Public-private partnerships ===
The now defunct Crown Corporation PPP Canada was created under Prime Minister Stephen Harper to highlight the commitment of the federal government to Public-private partnerships (PPP, P3). It was responsible for promoting and facilitating Public-private partnerships, and operated under Infrastructure Canada. PPP Canada managed the “P3 Canada fund” where provinces, territories, and municipalities could apply for funding from the federal government. PP Canada served as Canada's centralized PPP Unit from its creation in 2009 until it was dissolved in 2018 under Prime Minister Justin Trudeau.

Stephen Harper intended to fund most of Canada's new infrastructure though Public-private partnerships. The city council of Saint John, New Brunswick was told by their local Conservative MP Rodney Weston that funding their new water treatment plant through a P3 was the only option. Harper's Finance Minister Jim Flaherty intervened in the 2013 Regina wastewater plant funding referendum, arguing that voters should select the P3 option.

=== Building Canada Plan ===
The 2013 Canadian federal budget contained a new Building Canada Plan for the construction of public infrastructure such as roads, bridges, transit and port facilities. The plan provides $53 billion in investments to support local and economic infrastructure projects, including more than $47 billion in new funding over 10 years, starting in 2014–2015.

== Health policy ==
=== Patient Wait Times Guarantee ===
The conservative government promised to introduce a "Patient Wait Times Guarantee" in conjunction with the provinces. Harper has recently been criticized by prominent media figures, such as Paul Wells, for downplaying this fifth and final priority.

On January 11, 2007, Harper announced a $2.6 million pilot project involving a network of 16 pediatric hospitals across the nation. The plan is to monitor wait times in various children's hospitals and in the long range, surgery wait times. Similar existing measures have been implemented in the past by several provincial governments. Critics mentioned that the federal government had interfered in provincial jurisdictions while Ontario's Intergovernmental Affairs Minister Marie Bountrogianni cited the deal as a "photo-op" and an insignificant contribution to the health system. Previously, on January 5, 2007, the government also launched a similar pilot project worth $3.7 million for guaranteed wait times for aboriginal people from First Nations reserves in Manitoba who have "diabetes related-foot ulcers and possible amputations"

On April 4, 2007, a deal between Ottawa and the 13 provinces and territories was concluded in which guaranteed wait times will be implemented country-wide by two measures including funding for provinces to reach the goal. $612 million were given to the provinces during the 2007 federal budget. Health information and communication technologies were part of the second measure which included the participation of a non-profit organization, the Canada Health Infoway which will improve medical information notably for doctors.

=== Canadian Partnership Against Cancer ===
On November 24, 2006, Harper announced the Canadian Partnership Against Cancer, a 5-year $260 million national plan on battling different types of cancer. This not-for-profit organization will be monitored and evaluated by Health Canada. Prior to that announcement on October 23, Health Minister Tony Clement also launched an 8.4 million dollar heart health strategy that plans to tackle the issue of heart diseases and other related issues.

=== Toxic chemicals ===
On December 8, 2006, the government announced plan to crack down on the usage of toxic chemicals. The plan is worth an estimated $300 million over four years and would either eliminate, control or reduce some of the more hazardous toxic chemicals in order to protect the environment and the health and safety of Canadians, particularly in workplaces, as well as animals. The plan is a follow-up to the Canadian Environmental Protection Act that had previously named and targeted a series of dangerous substances.

=== Tainted blood scandal ===
On December 15, 2006, the government announced that it will officially compensate victims of a tainted blood scandal in which thousands of people were affected by Hepatitis C (during blood transfusions) before 1986 and after 1990. Those affected between 1986 and 1990 had already received the compensation in 1998. The amount of this deal was estimated at $1 billion.

== Federal Accountability Act ==
On April 11, 2006, President of the Treasury Board John Baird, on behalf of the Canadian government, tabled the Federal Accountability Act and action plan. The plan was meant to reduce the opportunity to exert influence in politics with money by: banning corporate, union, and large personal political donations; instituting a five-year lobbying ban on former ministers, their aides, and senior public servants; providing protection for whistleblowers; and enhancing the power for the auditor general to follow the money spent by the government.

While the government hoped to have this act passed before the House of Commons recessed for the summer, questions arose surrounding elements of the Federal Accountability Act and how it might affect the 2006 Liberal leadership convention. A $1,000 donation limit had been proposed as part of the Federal Accountability Act, with political party convention donations being tied to this amount. The Liberal Party of Canada's leadership convention scheduled for December 2006 contained a $995 convention fee, which under the proposed act could have prevented convention delegates from donating anything beyond their convention fee or prevented the delegate's presence at the convention should their convention fee in conjunction with any donations prior to the convention have put them above the donation limit. Some Liberal senators, who held the Senate majority at the time, threatened to stall the Federal Accountability Act in the upper chamber until after December 2006 because of the effect the proposed donation limits may have had on political party conventions.

On March 13, 2008, Justice John Gomery, who had led the commission into the federal sponsorship scandal, told the government operations Committee that most of the recommendations he made in his report were still not implemented. He added that the prime minister's office was "developing a dangerous concentration of power" and that certain members such as non-elected officials were gaining more power while lesser-known MPs had little influence. He noted that the government's Federal Accountability Act was drafted well before his report and fell short of what was required.

== National unity ==
After sidestepping the political landmine for most of his first year in office, much as all of the post-Charlottetown Accord Prime Ministers had done, Harper reopened the debate on November 22, 2006, by introducing a motion in the House of Commons to recognize "the Québécois" as a "nation within Canada." His hand was forced after the opposition Bloc Québécois were to introduce a motion that called for recognition of Quebec as a "nation", but not within Canada. The Bloc later modified partly his motion and later decided to support the Conservative motion, which was greeted by Parti Québécois Leader Andre Boisclair and by Quebec Premier Minister Jean Charest. However, Intergovernmental Minister Michael Chong said he didn't want the country's unity to be compromised and divided. He resigned his Cabinet position on November 27 over the matter, ahead of a vote on the motion which passed first reading in the House of Commons 266 to 16. It also rejected a Bloc Québécois amendment that did not have mention of Canada.

== Parliamentary reform ==
=== Election dates ===
In 2007, parliament passed the government's bill that would set election dates on the third Monday in October of the fourth calendar year following polling day for the last general election, thereby reducing the maximum life of a parliament from the time set by the Constitution Act, 1867. The amendment to the Canada Elections Act, however, did not touch the governor general's prerogative to dissolve parliament or call elections, as such is a constitutional matter. Thus, the prime minister may advise such a move whenever he or she feels is prudent. The first election after the amendment was implemented occurred earlier than the date prescribed by the act; Harper argued that he had to advise an election be called because the minority parliament had become dysfunctional.

=== Senate reform ===
During the 2006 election, Harper had promised that he would push for a major reform in the Senate of Canada, one of the main objectives of the former Reform Party, promising that senators would be elected. On December 13, 2006, Harper introduced a bill that would "bring democracy" to the Senate and, on September 7, 2006, he became the first Canadian prime minister to appear before a Senate committee and was present to make his government's case for Senate reform. Critics, though, believed that it would require an amendment to the constitution.

With one notable exception, he, as prime minister, refused to advise any appointments to the Senate pending such reforms. This resulted in 16 Senate vacancies by the time the Conservative Party won a minority in the October 2008 election.

The one notable exception was Michael Fortier: When Harper first took office, he resorted to the appointment of Michael Fortier to both the Senate and the Cabinet, arguing the government needed representation for the city of Montreal. Although this is not without precedence in the Westminster system, this led to many criticisms given the Reform Party's position supporting an elected Senate. In 2008, Fortier gave up his Senate seat and sought election as a Member of Parliament, but, was, in the words of Canadian Press, "trounced." Upon re-election in 2008, Harper named Senate reform again as a priority.

On December 11, 2008, it was reported that Harper would advise all 18 Senate vacancies be filled with Conservative Party affiliates. This was to prevent a possible coalition government from filling those seats, which, at the time, seemed imminent. The reports were confirmed on December 22, 2008, that Harper had filled all of the senate vacancies with Conservatives. On August 27, 2009, Harper again directed the governor general to fill Senate vacancies with nine more Conservative senators; Harper claimed that the Senate could not function properly with the vacancies and the new senators would help the Conservative Party's legislation pass more easily.

On November 5, 2007, Harper supported a motion made by the NDP to organize a referendum that would decide the fate of the Senate, including the possibility of abolishing it, as Jack Layton described it as "outdated institution that has no place in a modern democracy". However, experts said that the NDP-Conservative plan would likely fail, with a historian indicating that it would be impossible to pass the motion with a Liberal-majority Senate, and to have an amendment to the constitution accepted by the majority of the provinces.

== Other ==
The Canadian government reinstituted a policy of lowering the national flag at military installations such as Department of National Defence headquarters only, drawing criticism that the government was showing a lack of respect for the soldiers although veterans groups such as the Royal Canadian Legion support this policy.

== See also ==
- Stephen Harper
- Foreign policy of the Stephen Harper government
- Environmental policy of the Stephen Harper government
