= History of the Conservative Party of Canada =

Aspect of Canadian political history

This article covers the history of the Conservative Party of Canada and its predecessors, the Liberal-Conservative Party, the party from 1867 to 1942, and the Progressive Conservative Party of Canada.

== Predecessors ==
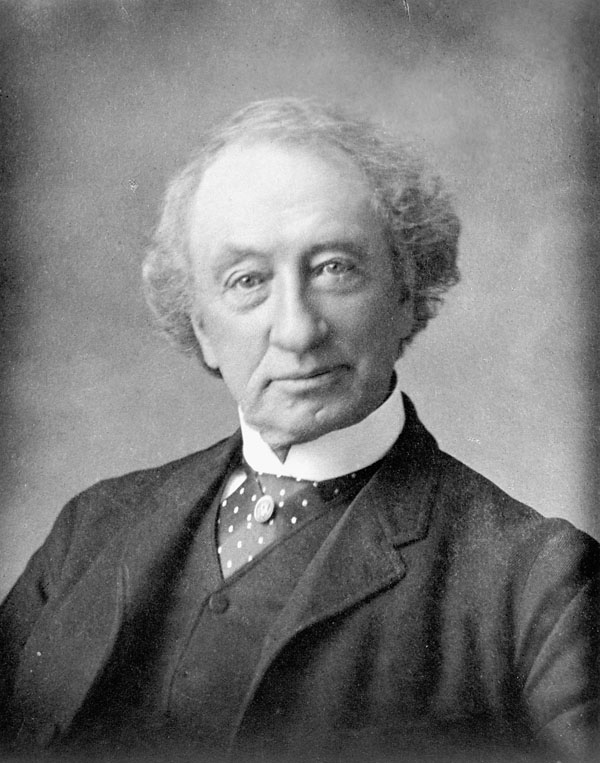
John A. Macdonald, Prime Minister (1867–1873, 1878–1891), Canada's first Prime Minister and leader of the Liberal-Conservative Party, one of the party's predecessors.

The Conservative Party is political heir to a series of right-of-centre parties that have existed in Canada, beginning with the Upper Canada Tories of the nineteenth century. John A. Macdonald and George-Étienne Cartier later founded the Liberal-Conservative Party. The party later became known simply as the Conservative Party after 1873, but the official party name essentially remained Liberal-Conservative until 1938. Like its historical predecessors and conservative parties in some other Commonwealth nations (such as the Conservative Party of the United Kingdom), members of the present-day Conservative Party of Canada are sometimes referred to as "Tories". The modern Conservative Party of Canada is also legal heir to the heritage of the historical conservative parties by virtue of assuming the assets and liabilities of the former Progressive Conservative Party upon the merger of 2003.

The first incarnations of the Conservative Party in Canada were quite different from the Conservative Party of today, especially on economic issues. The early Conservatives were known to espouse economic protectionism and British imperialism, by emphasizing Canada's ties to the United Kingdom while vigorously opposing free trade with the United States, free trade being a policy which, at the time, had support from the ranks of the Liberal Party. The Conservatives also sparred with the Liberal Party because of its connections with French Canadian nationalists including Henri Bourassa, who wanted Canada to distance itself from Britain and demanded that Canada recognize that it had two nations, English Canada and French Canada, connected together through a common history.

=== Progressive Conservative Party of Canada ===
The Conservative Party's popular support waned (particularly in Western Canada) during difficult economic times from the 1920s to 1940s, as it was seen by many in the west as an eastern establishment party that ignored the needs of the citizens of Western Canada. Westerners of multiple political convictions (including small-"c" conservatives) saw the party as being uninterested in the economically unstable Prairie regions of the west at the time; instead, Western Canadians believed the party held close ties with the business elite of Ontario and Quebec. As a result of western alienation, both the dominant Conservative and Liberal parties were challenged in the west by the rise of a number of protest parties including the Progressive Party of Canada, the Co-operative Commonwealth Federation (CCF), the Reconstruction Party of Canada and the Social Credit Party of Canada. In 1921, the Conservatives were reduced to third place in number of seats in the House of Common behind the Progressives. The premier of Manitoba and leader of the Progressive Party of Manitoba, John Bracken became leader of the Conservative Party in 1942 subject to several conditions, one of which was that the party be renamed the Progressive Conservative Party.

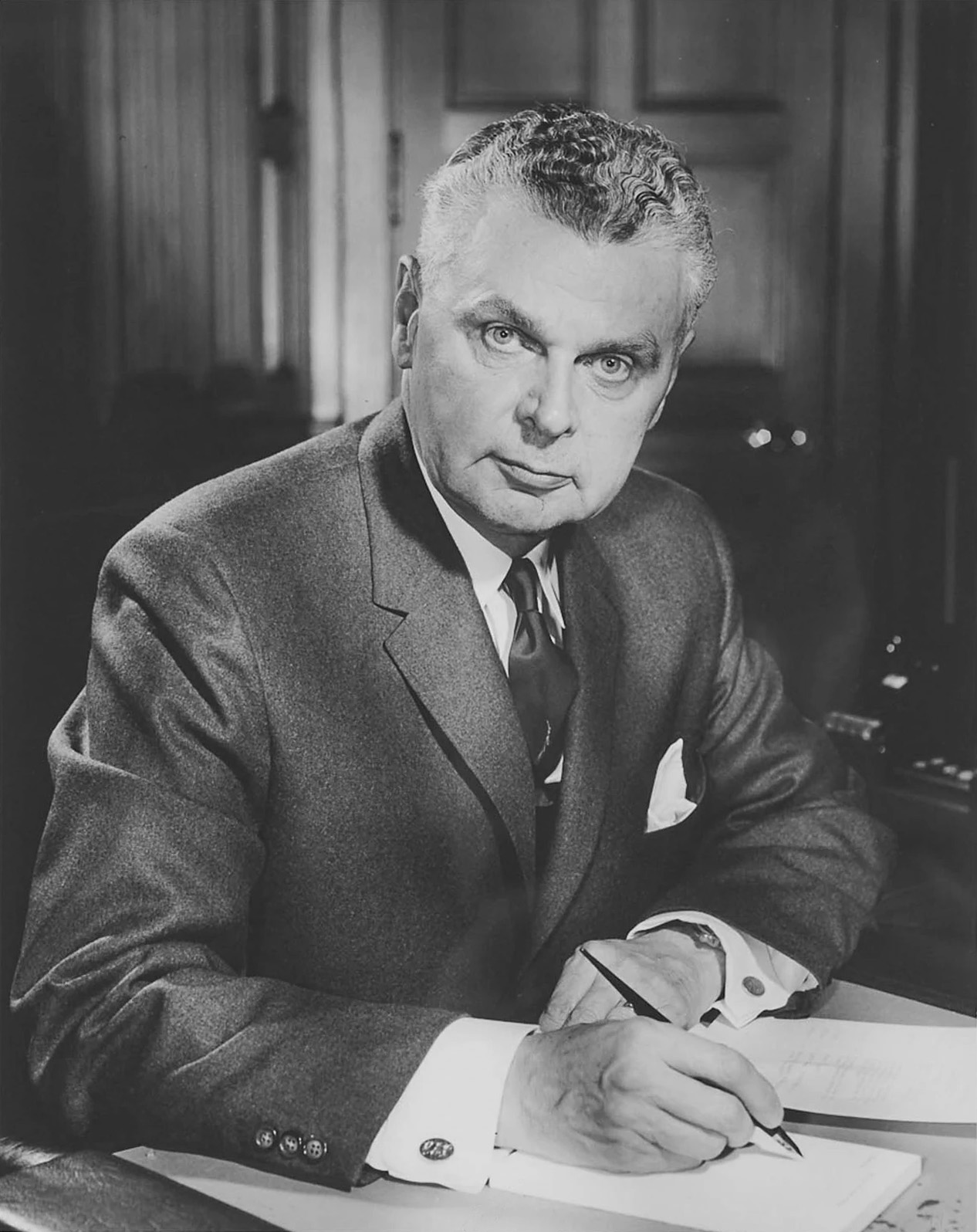
John Diefenbaker, Prime Minister (1957–1963).

Meanwhile, many former supporters of the Progressive Conservative Party shifted their support to either the federal CCF or to the federal Liberals. The advancement of the provincially popular western-based conservative Social Credit Party in federal politics was stalled, in part by the strategic selection of leaders from the west by the Progressive Conservative Party. Progressive Conservative leaders such as John Diefenbaker and Joe Clark were seen by many westerners as viable challengers to the Liberals who traditionally had relied on the electorate in Quebec and Ontario for their power base. While none of the various protest parties ever succeeded in gaining significant power federally, they were damaging to the Progressive Conservative Party throughout its history, and allowed the federal Liberals to win election after election with strong urban support bases in Ontario and Quebec. This historical tendency earned the Liberals the unofficial title often given by some political pundits of being Canada's "natural governing party". Prior to 1984, Canada was seen as having a dominant-party system led by the Liberal Party while Progressive Conservative governments therefore were considered by many of these pundits as caretaker governments, doomed to fall once the collective mood of the electorate shifted and the federal Liberal Party eventually came back to power.

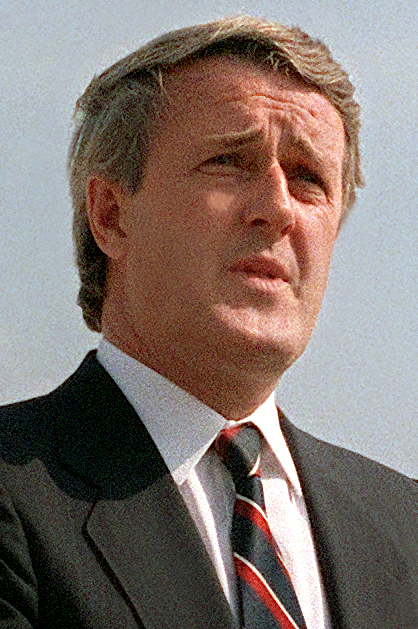
Brian Mulroney, Prime Minister (1984–1993).

In 1984, the Progressive Conservative Party's electoral fortunes made a massive upturn under its new leader, Brian Mulroney, an anglophone Quebecer and former president of the Iron Ore Company of Canada, who mustered a large coalition of westerners, aggravated over the National Energy Program of the Liberal government, suburban and small-town Ontarians, and soft Quebec nationalists, who were angered over Quebec not having distinct status in the Constitution of Canada signed in 1982. This led to a huge landslide victory for the Progressive Conservative Party. Progressive Conservatives abandoned protectionism which the party had held strongly to in the past and which had aggravated westerners and businesses and fully espoused free trade with the United States and integrating Canada into a globalized economy. This was accomplished with the signing of the Canada-United States Free Trade Agreement (FTA) of 1989 and much of the key implementation process of the North American Free Trade Agreement (NAFTA), which added Mexico to the Canada-U.S. free trade zone.

=== Reform Party of Canada ===
In the late 1980s and 1990s, federal conservative politics became split by the creation of a new western-based protest party, the populist and social conservative Reform Party of Canada created by Preston Manning, the son of an Alberta Social Credit premier, Ernest Manning. It advocated deep decentralization of government power, abolition of official bilingualism and multiculturalism, democratization of the Senate of Canada, and suggested a potential return to capital punishment, and advocated significant privatization of public services. Westerners reportedly felt betrayed by the federal Progressive Conservative Party, seeing it as catering to Quebec and urban Ontario interests over theirs. In 1989, Reform made headlines in the political scene when its first member of Parliament (MP), Deborah Grey, was elected in a by-election in Alberta, which was a shock to the PCs which had almost complete electoral dominance over the province for years. Another defining event for western conservatives was when Mulroney accepted the results of an unofficial Senate "election" held in Alberta, which resulted in the appointment of a Reformer, Stanley Waters, to the Senate.

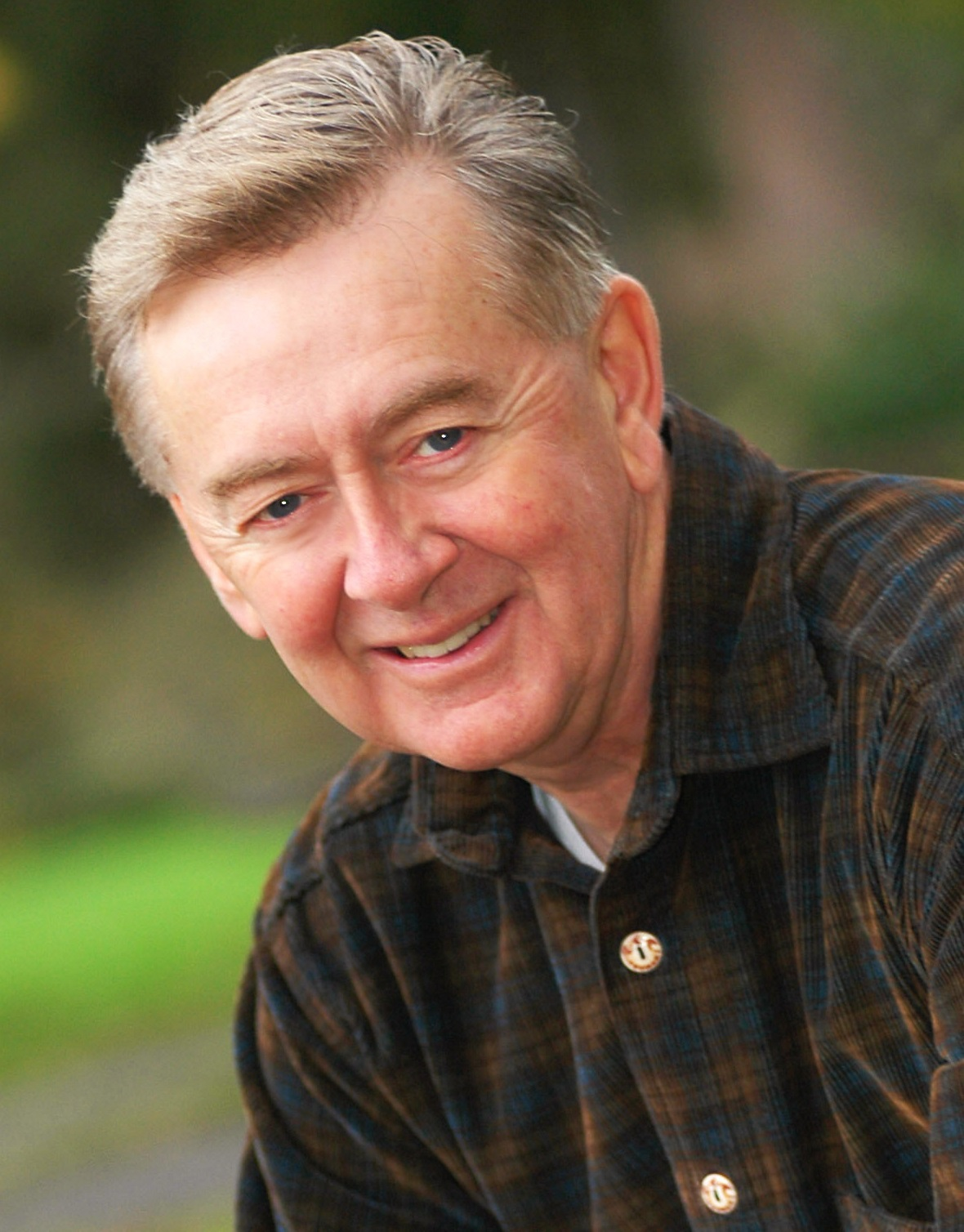
Preston Manning, Reform party founder and leader from 1987 to 2000.

By the 1990s, Mulroney had failed to bring about Senate reform as he had promised (appointing a number of Senators in 1990). As well, social conservatives were dissatisfied with Mulroney's increasing social progressivism. Canadians in general were disenchanted with extremely high unemployment, Canada's soaring debt and deficit, a bungled implementation of the deeply unpopular Goods and Services Tax (GST) in 1991, and failed constitutional reforms of the Meech Lake and Charlottetown accords. In 1993, support for the Progressive Conservative Party collapsed, and the party's representation in the House of Commons dropped from an absolute majority of seats to only two seats. The 1993 results were the worst electoral disaster in Canadian history, and the Progressive Conservatives never fully recovered.

In 1993, federal politics became divided regionally. The Liberal Party took Ontario, the Maritimes and the territories, the separatist Bloc Québécois took Quebec, while the Reform Party took Western Canada and became the dominant conservative party in Canada. The problem of the split on the right was accentuated by Canada's single member plurality electoral system, which resulted in numerous seats being won by the Liberal Party, even when the total number of votes cast for PC and Reform Party candidates was substantially in excess of the total number of votes cast for the Liberal candidate.

== Foundation and early history ==
=== Merger agreement ===
In 2003, the Canadian Alliance (formerly the Reform Party) and Progressive Conservative parties agreed to merge into the present-day Conservative Party, with the Alliance faction conceding its populist ideals and some social conservative elements.

On October 15, 2003, after closed-door meetings were held by the Canadian Alliance and Progressive Conservative Party, Stephen Harper (then the leader of the Canadian Alliance) and Peter MacKay (then the leader of the Progressive Conservatives) announced the "'Conservative Party Agreement-in-Principle", thereby merging their parties to create the new Conservative Party of Canada. After several months of talks between two teams of "emissaries", consisting of Don Mazankowski, Bill Davis and Loyola Hearn on behalf of the PCs and Ray Speaker Senator Gerry St. Germain and Scott Reid on behalf of the Alliance, the deal came to be.

On December 5, 2003, the Agreement-in-Principle was ratified by the membership of the Alliance by a margin of 96% to 4% in a national referendum conducted by postal ballot. On December 6, the PC Party held a series of regional conventions, at which delegates ratified the Agreement-in-Principle by a margin of 90% to 10%. On December 7, the new party was officially registered with Elections Canada. On March 20, 2004, Harper was elected leader.

=== Opposition to the merger ===
The merger process was opposed by some elements in both parties. In the PCs in particular, the merger process resulted in organized opposition, and in a substantial number of prominent members refusing to join the new party. The opponents of the merger were not internally united as a single internal opposition movement, and they did not announce their opposition at the same moment. David Orchard argued that his written agreement with Peter MacKay, which had been signed a few months earlier at the 2003 Progressive Conservative Leadership convention, excluded any such merger. Orchard announced his opposition to the merger before negotiations with the Canadian Alliance had been completed. The basis of Orchard's crucial support for MacKay's leadership bid was MacKay's promise in writing to Orchard not merge the Alliance and PC parties. Over the course of the following year, Orchard led an unsuccessful legal challenge to the merger of the two parties.

In October and November, during the course of the PC party's process of ratifying the merger, four sitting Progressive Conservative MPs — André Bachand, John Herron, former Tory leadership candidate Scott Brison, and former prime minister Joe Clark—announced their intention not to join the new Conservative Party caucus, as did retiring PC Party president Bruck Easton. Clark and Brison argued that the party's merger with the Canadian Alliance drove it too far to the right, and away from its historical position in Canadian politics.

On January 14, 2004, former Alliance leadership candidate Keith Martin left the party, and sat temporarily as an independent. He was reelected, running as a Liberal, in the 2004 election, and again in 2006 and 2008.

In the early months following the merger, MP Rick Borotsik, who had been elected as Manitoba's only PC, became openly critical of the new party's leadership. Borotsik chose not to run in the 2004 general election. Brison, at first, voted for and supported the ratification of the Alliance-PC merger, then crossed the floor to the Liberals. Soon afterward, he was made a parliamentary secretary in Paul Martin's Liberal government. Herron also ran as a Liberal candidate in the election, but did not join the Liberal caucus prior to the election. He lost his seat to the new Conservative Party's candidate Rob Moore. Bachand and Clark sat as independent Progressive Conservatives until an election was called in the spring of 2004, and then retired from Parliament.

Three senators, William Doody, Norman Atkins, and Lowell Murray, declined to join the new party and continued to sit in the upper house as a rump caucus of Progressive Conservatives. In February 2005, Liberals appointed two anti-merger Progressive Conservatives, Nancy Ruth and Elaine McCoy, to the Senate. In March 2006, Nancy Ruth joined the new Conservative Party.

Finally, following the 2004 federal election, Conservative Senator Jean-Claude Rivest left the party to sit as an independent (choosing not to join senators Doody, Atkins and Murray in their rump Progressive Conservative caucus). Senator Rivest cited, as his reason for this action, his concern that the new party was too right-wing and that it was insensitive to the needs and interests of Quebec.

=== Inaugural leadership election ===
In the immediate aftermath of the merger announcement, some Conservative activists hoped to recruit former Ontario premier Mike Harris for the leadership. Harris declined the invitation, as did New Brunswick Premier Bernard Lord and Alberta Premier Ralph Klein. Outgoing Progressive Conservative leader Peter MacKay also announced he would not seek the leadership, as did former Democratic Representative Caucus leader Chuck Strahl. Jim Prentice, who had been a candidate in the 2003 PC leadership contest, entered the Conservative leadership race in mid-December but dropped out in mid-January because of an inability to raise funds so soon after his earlier leadership bid. In the end, there were three candidates in the party's first leadership election: former Canadian Alliance leader Stephen Harper, former Magna International CEO Belinda Stronach, and former Ontario provincial PC Cabinet minister Tony Clement.

The vote was conducted using a weighted voting system in which each of the party's riding associations were given 100 points, regardless of the number of votes cast by party members in that riding (for a total of 30,800 points, with 15,401 points required to win). Each candidate would be awarded a number of points equivalent to the percentage of the votes they had won in that riding. This system was selected as a condition of the merger, to prevent the far larger Canadian Alliance membership base from overwhelming that of the Progressive Conservatives.

Voting took place on March 20, 2004. A total of 97,397 ballots were cast. Harper won on the first ballot with 56.2% of available points. Stronach received 34.5%, and Clement received 9.4%.

== Stephen Harper ==
=== In opposition (2004–2006) ===
Two months after Harper's election as leader, Liberal leader and Prime Minister Paul Martin called a general election for June 28, 2004.

For the first time since the 1993 election, a Liberal government would have to deal with an opposition party that was generally seen as being able to form government. The Liberals attempted to counter this with an early election call, as this would give the Conservatives less time to consolidate their merger. During the first half of the campaign, polls showed a rise in support for the new party, leading some pollsters to predict the election of a minority Conservative government. Momentum stalled after several Conservative candidates made controversial remarks about homosexuality, official bilingualism and abortion, allowing the Liberal Party to warn of a "hidden agenda". Ultimately, Harper's new Conservatives emerged from the election with a larger parliamentary caucus of 99 MPs while the Liberals were reduced to a minority government of 135 MPs, twenty short of a majority.

In 2005, some political analysts such as former Progressive Conservative pollster Allan Gregg and Toronto Star columnist Chantal Hébert suggested that the then-subsequent election could result in a Conservative government if the public were to perceive the Tories as emerging from the party's founding convention (then scheduled for March 2005 in Montreal) with clearly defined, moderate policies with which to challenge the Liberals. The convention provided the public with an opportunity to see the Conservative Party in a new light, appearing to have reduced the focus on its controversial social conservative agenda. It retained its fiscal conservative appeal by espousing tax cuts, smaller government, and more decentralization by giving the provinces more taxing powers and decision-making authority in joint federal-provincial programs. The party's law and order package was an effort to address rising homicide rates, which had gone up 12% in 2004.

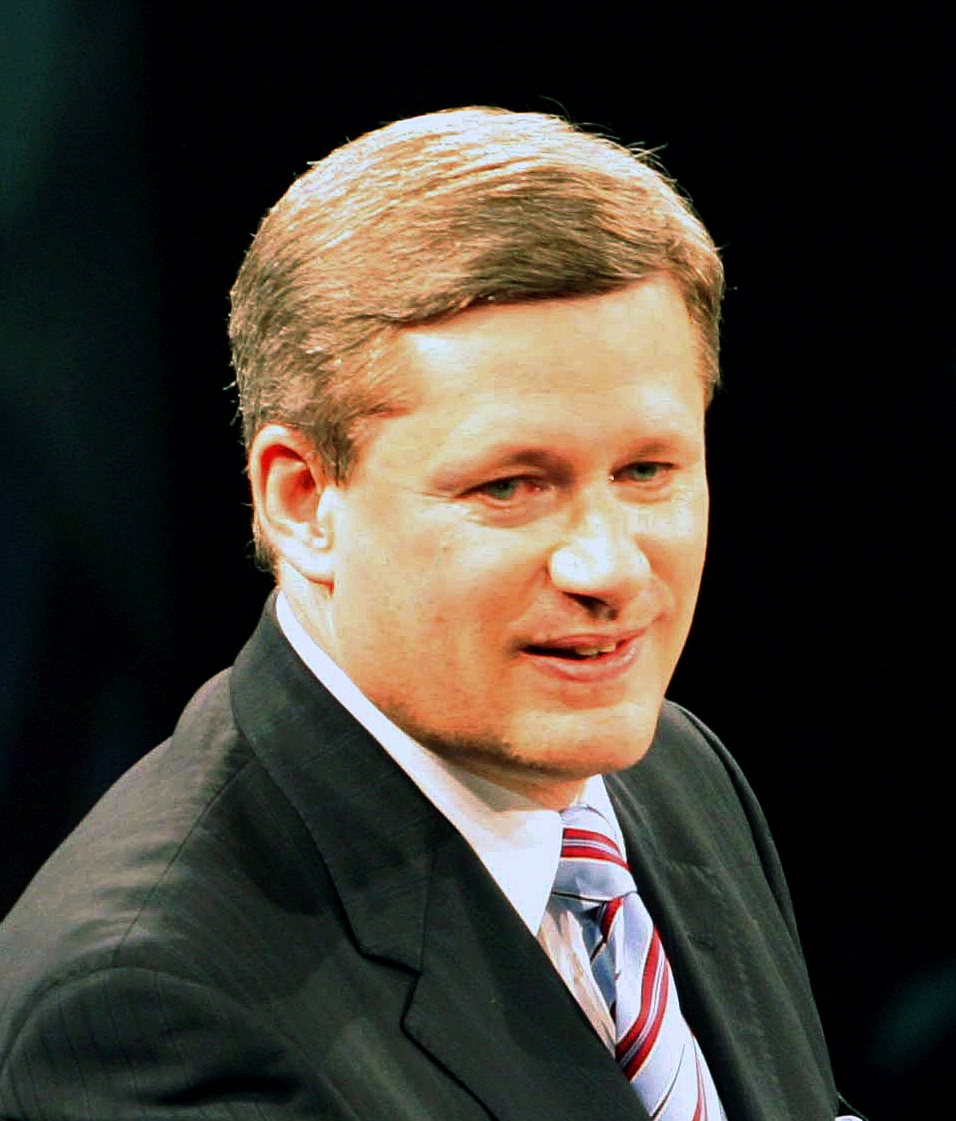
Stephen Harper as opposition leader (2006).

On May 17, 2005, MP Belinda Stronach unexpectedly crossed the floor to join the Liberal Party. In late August and early September 2005, the Tories released ads through Ontario's major television broadcasters that highlighted their policies towards health care, education and child support. The ads each featured Stephen Harper discussing policy with prominent members of his Shadow Cabinet. Some analysts suggested at the time that the Tories would use similar ads in the next election, instead of focusing their attacks on allegations of corruption in the Liberal government as they did prior.

An Ipsos-Reid Poll conducted after the fallout from the first report of the Gomery Commission on the sponsorship scandal showed the Tories practically tied for public support with the governing Liberal Party, and a poll from the Strategic Counsel suggested that the Conservatives were actually in the lead. However, polling two days later showed the Liberals had regained an 8-point lead. On November 24, 2005, Harper introduced a motion of no confidence which, with the backing of the other opposition parties, was passed on November 28, 2005. This resulted in an election on January 23, 2006, following a campaign spanning the Christmas season.

The Conservatives started off the first month of the campaign by making a series of policy-per-day announcements, while the Liberals opted to hold their major announcements after the Christmas holidays; as a result, Harper dominated media coverage for the first few weeks of the campaign and was able "to define himself, rather than to let the Liberals define him". The Conservatives' announcements played to Harper's strengths as a policy wonk, as opposed to the 2004 election and summer 2005 where he tried to overcome the perception that he was cool and aloof. Though his party showed only modest movement in the polls, Harper's personal approval numbers, which had always trailed his party's significantly, began to rise. By January 2006, the Tories were leading in the polls, and made a major breakthrough in Quebec where they displaced the Liberals as the second place party (after the Bloc Québécois);

On January 23, 2006, the Conservatives won 124 seats, compared to 103 for the Liberals. The results made the Conservatives the largest party in the 308-member House of Commons, enabling them to form a minority government.

=== In government (2006–2015) ===
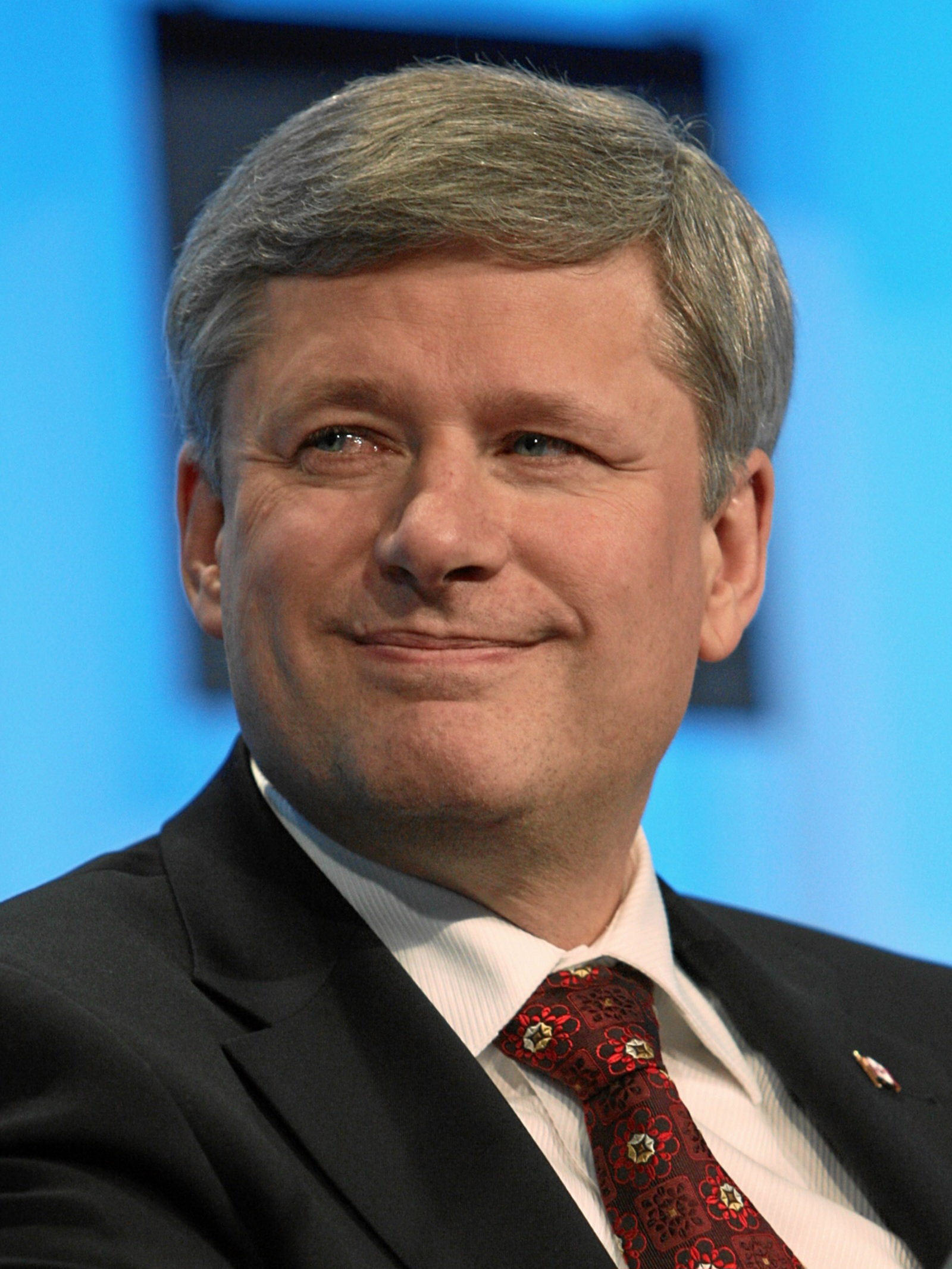
Stephen Harper, prime minister (2006–2015)

On February 6, 2006, Harper and his Cabinet were sworn in. The Conservative Party confronted the In and Out scandal, regarding improper election spending during the 2006 election. The government's first budget produced a nearly $14 billion surplus, a number slightly greater than the Martin government. The budget also drastically increased military spending and scrapped funding for the Kyoto Protocol and the Kelowna Accord. Later, the government introduced the tax-free savings account (TFSA). The government passed the Veterans' Bill of Rights, which guaranteed benefits for veterans from Veterans Affairs Canada, in addition to guaranteeing equality of veterans and referring to them as "special citizens". The government also passed the Québécois nation motion which would "recognize Quebec as a nation within a united Canada." Despite its social conservative past in the Canadian Alliance, the government did not attempt to reverse the same-sex marriage law implemented by the Martin government nor did it attempt to make changes to abortion laws.

Deadlock between the Conservatives and the Liberals, the New Democratic Party, and the Bloc Québécois led to the calling of the October 2008 federal election, in which the Conservatives won a stronger minority. Shortly after, the Conservatives fought off a vote of non-confidence by a potential governing coalition of opposition parties by proroguing parliament. In his second term, Harper's government responded to the 2008 financial crisis by introducing the Economic Action Plan that implemented major personal income tax cuts. However, these tax cuts, along with increases in spending to combat the 2008 financial crisis, grew the deficit to $55.6 billion – Canada's largest federal deficit up to that time.

A March 2011 non-confidence vote that found the Harper government to be in contempt of Parliament dissolved Parliament and triggered an election. In this election, the Conservatives won a majority government. The Harper government withdrew Canada from the Kyoto Protocol and repealed the long-gun registry. In foreign policy, the government passed the Anti-terrorism Act, launched Operation Impact to combat ISIL, negotiated the Comprehensive Economic and Trade Agreement (CETA) with the European Union, and negotiated the Trans-Pacific Partnership (TPP). The Conservatives also gained controversy surrounding the Canadian Senate expenses scandal and the Robocall scandal; the latter involved robocalls and real-person calls that were designed to result in voter suppression in the 2011 election. In economic policy, the government launched Canada's Global Markets Action Plan to generate employment opportunities for Canadians by expanding Canadian businesses and investment in other countries, and balanced the budget in the 2014 federal budget, producing a minor deficit of $550 million.

In the 2015 federal election, after nearly a decade in power, the Conservatives suffered a landslide defeat at the hands of Justin Trudeau and his Liberal Party. Harper stepped down as leader on the election day on October 19. Journalist John Ibbitson of The Globe and Mail described Harper as "the most conservative leader Canada has ever known."

Results of the 2015 Canadian federal election showing support for Conservative Party candidates by riding

== In opposition (2015–present) ==
=== First interim leadership (2015–2017) ===
Following the election of the Liberals and Harper's resignation as party leader in the 2015 election, it was announced that an interim leader would be selected to serve until a new leader could be chosen. That was completed at the caucus meeting of November 5, 2015 where Rona Ambrose, MP for Sturgeon River—Parkland and a former cabinet minister, was elected by a vote of MPs and Senators.

Some members of the party's national council were calling for a leadership convention as early as May 2016 according to Maclean's magazine. However, some other MPs wanted the vote to be delayed until the spring of 2017. On January 19, 2016, the party announced that a permanent leader would be chosen on May 27, 2017.

The 2017 leadership election attracted a total of thirteen candidates for the leadership. Businessman Kevin O'Leary was the early favourite in the race, until he dropped out, citing weak support in Quebec; he subsequently endorsed Maxime Bernier, who became the frontrunner. On May 27, 2017, Andrew Scheer was elected as the second permanent leader of the party, prevailing over Bernier with 50.95% of the vote through 13 rounds. Many considered Scheer's victory an upset.

=== Andrew Scheer (2017–2020) ===
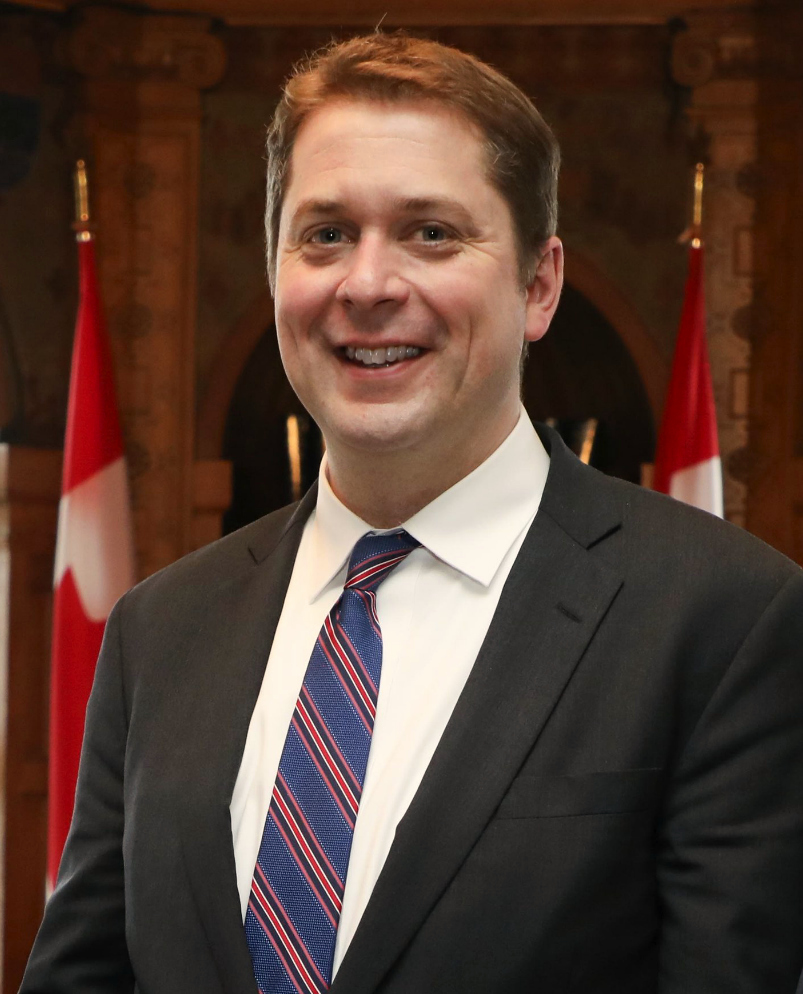
Andrew Scheer, leader (2017–2020)

Under Scheer, the Conservatives prioritized repealing the Liberal government's carbon tax, pipeline construction, and balancing the budget within five years had they formed government in 2019. Scheer is a social conservative; he is personally pro-life and opposes same-sex marriage, though like Harper, he stated he wouldn't overturn the legality of both laws.

The Conservative Party entered the October 2019 federal election campaign neck-in-neck with the Liberals after the SNC-Lavalin affair earlier that year involving Justin Trudeau, but the election resulted in a Liberal minority government victory. The Conservatives did, however, win the largest share of the popular vote, and gained 26 seats. Notably, they won every single seat in Saskatchewan and all but one in Alberta. While the Conservative Party has historically been highly successful in Alberta and Saskatchewan, some point to a growing sense of Western alienation to explain the results. Following the election, Scheer faced criticism from within the party for failing to defeat Trudeau, who gained criticism for his handling of the SNC-Lavalin affair and for his wearing of brownface and blackface; the latter incident was made public during the election campaign. Scheer announced his pending resignation on December 12, 2019, after the CBC reported that the Conservative party had been paying part of his children's private school tuition. He remained party leader until his successor was chosen in August 2020.

=== Erin O'Toole (2020–2022) ===
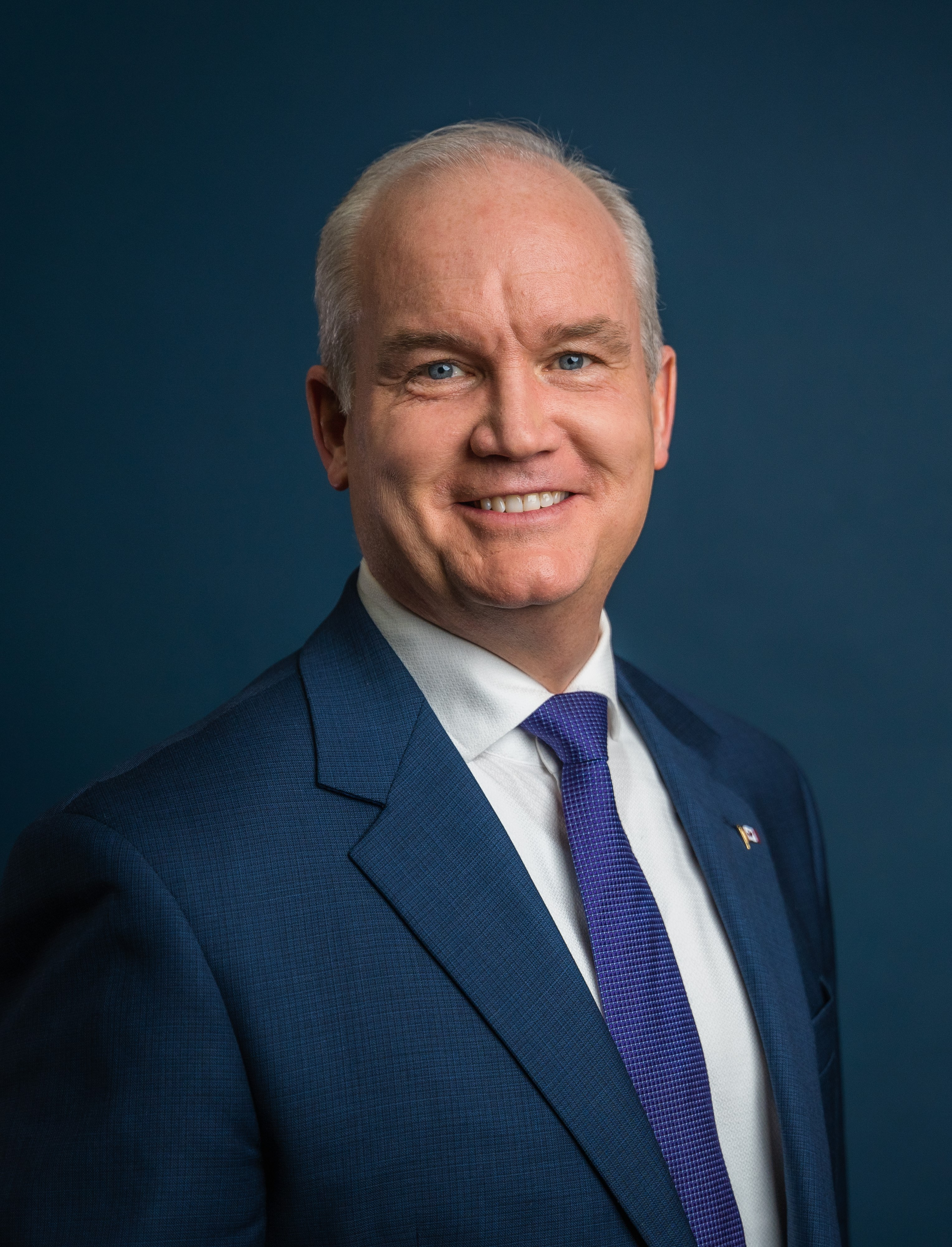
Erin O'Toole, leader (2020–2022)

A leadership election to replace Scheer was held in 2020, which was won by former veterans affairs minister Erin O'Toole on August 24, 2020.

Though running for the leadership on a "true blue" platform, O'Toole started to nudge the Conservative Party to the political centre as leader. Despite campaigning against the Liberal government's carbon tax during his leadership campaign, O'Toole reversed his position in April 2021, instead advocating for a low carbon savings account. O'Toole is pro-choice and supports same-sex marriage, positions heavily different from his two predecessors as leader.

Prime Minister Trudeau called the September 2021 federal election in the hopes of winning a majority government, though in the middle of the campaign O'Toole's Conservatives were neck and neck, if not slightly ahead of the Liberals in the polls. During the campaign, O'Toole stated he would balance the budget within the next 10 years and reversed his support for repealing the Liberal government's "assault-style" weapons ban. In a similar manner to the 2019 election, the Conservatives again won the popular vote but fell short of gaining the largest amount of seats, enabling the Liberal Party under Justin Trudeau to form another minority government.

As a result, party members were undecided on whether he should continue as leader. On October 5, the Conservative caucus voted to adopt the provisions of the Reform Act, giving caucus the power to trigger a leadership review. O'Toole denied that it represented a threat to his leadership, insisting that the caucus was united as a team and that, as a supporter of the Act, he had encouraged his caucus to adopt all of its provisions.

On January 31, 2022, Conservative Calgary Heritage MP Bob Benzen submitted a letter with signatures from 35 Conservative MPs calling for a leadership review on O'Toole's leadership to the Conservative caucus chair, Scott Reid. In the letter, Benzen criticized O'Toole's reversal on repealing the Liberal government's carbon tax and assault weapons ban. On February 2, 2022, O'Toole was voted out as leader by a margin of 73 to 45 votes.

=== Second interim leadership (2022) ===
Logo of the Conservative Party during Scheer's leadership, an updated version of the Harper-era logo

Deputy leader of the Conservative Party Candice Bergen was elected interim leader the same day O'Toole was ousted. Bergen's position as interim leader only lasted a few months as a leadership election was being held. Conservative MP and former cabinet minister Pierre Poilievre consistently led the race in opinion polls, announcing that he was "running for Prime Minister" in his campaign launch video.

=== Pierre Poilievre (2022–present) ===
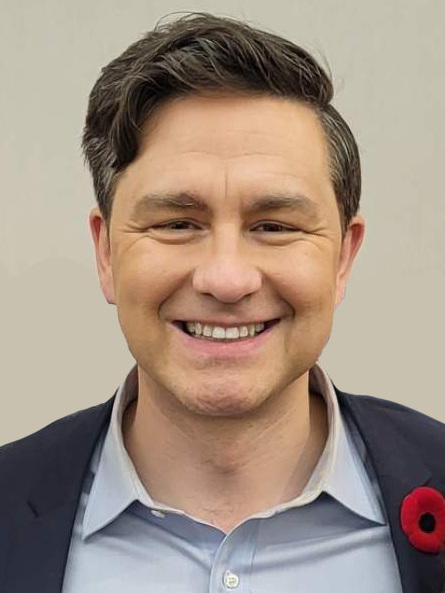
Pierre Poilievre, leader (2022–present)

Poilievre won the 2022 Conservative Party leadership election, winning a landslide on the first ballot. Described as a populist, he has primarily focused on economic issues, especially the cost of living in Canada and arguing for the repeal of the federal carbon tax. Poilievre is considered to be part of the Blue Tory faction within the Conservative Party.

In the 2025 Canadian federal election, Poilievre lost his seat of Carleton to Liberal candidate Bruce Fanjoy, while the Conservatives under Poilievre increased their seat total from 120 to 144 seats and achieved the highest popular vote share since the party's founding in 2003. However, the election resulted in a Liberal minority government. Poilievre ran in the Conservative-safe riding of Battle River—Crowfoot, Alberta, in a by-election, after incumbent party MP Damien Kurek announced his intention to resign his seat. He was elected, and thus again became Leader of the Official Opposition.

== Election results ==
Election results for the House of Commons of the different forms of the Conservative Party of Canada since 1867.

=== House of Commons ===
Election	Leader	Votes	%	Seats	+/–	Position	Status
1867	John A. Macdonald	92,656	34.53	100 / 180	▲100	▲1st	Majority
1872	John A. Macdonald	123,100	38.66	100 / 200	Steady	1st	Minority
1874	John A. Macdonald	99,440	30.58	65 / 206	▼35	▼2nd	Opposition
1878	John A. Macdonald	229,191	42.06	129 / 206	▲64	▲1st	Majority
1882	John A. Macdonald	208,544	40.39	136 / 215	▲7	1st	Majority
1887	John A. Macdonald	343,805	47.41	111 / 215	▼25	1st	Majority
1891	John A. Macdonald	376,518	48.58	117 / 215	▲6	1st	Majority
1896	Charles Tupper	467,415	48.17	98 / 213	▼19	▼2nd	Opposition
1900	Charles Tupper	438,330	46.10	79 / 213	▼9	2nd	Opposition
1904	Robert Borden	470,430	45.94	75 / 214	▼4	2nd	Opposition
1908	Robert Borden	539,374	46.21	85 / 221	▲10	2nd	Opposition
1911	Robert Borden	636,938	48.90	132 / 221	▲48	▲1st	Majority
1917	Robert Borden	1,070,694	56.93	152 / 235	▲20	1st	Majority
1921	Arthur Meighen	935,651	29.95	49 / 235	▼103	▼3rd	Third Party
1925	Arthur Meighen	1,454,253	46.13	114 / 245	▲65	▲1st	Opposition
1925	Arthur Meighen	1,454,253	46.13	114 / 245	▲65	▲1st	Minority
1926	Arthur Meighen	1,476,834	45.34	91 / 245	▼23	▼2nd	Opposition
1930	R. B. Bennett	1,836,115	47.79	137 / 245	▲46	▲1st	Majority
1935	R. B. Bennett	1,290,671	29.84	39 / 245	▼98	▼2nd	Opposition
1940	Robert James Manion	1,402,059	30.41	39 / 245	Steady	2nd	Opposition
1945	John Bracken	1,448,744	27.62	64 / 245	▲27	2nd	Opposition
1949	George A. Drew	1,734,261	29.62	41 / 262	▼23	2nd	Opposition
1953	George A. Drew	1,749,579	31.01	50 / 265	▲9	2nd	Opposition
1957	John Diefenbaker	2,564,732	38.81	112 / 265	▲62	▲1st	Minority
1958	John Diefenbaker	3,908,633	53.56	208 / 265	▲96	1st	Majority
1962	John Diefenbaker	2,865,542	37.22	116 / 265	▼92	1st	Minority
1963	John Diefenbaker	2,591,613	32.80	93 / 265	▼23	▼2nd	Opposition
1965	John Diefenbaker	2,500,113	32.41	95 / 265	▲2	2nd	Opposition
1968	Robert Stanfield	2,554,397	31.43	72 / 264	▼23	2nd	Opposition
1972	Robert Stanfield	3,388,980	35.02	107 / 264	▲35	2nd	Opposition
1974	Robert Stanfield	3,371,319	35.46	95 / 264	▼12	2nd	Opposition
1979	Joe Clark	4,111,606	35.89	136 / 282	▲41	▲1st	Minority
1980	Joe Clark	3,552,994	32.49	103 / 282	▼33	▼2nd	Opposition
1984	Brian Mulroney	6,278,818	50.03	211 / 282	▲108	▲1st	Majority
1988	Brian Mulroney	5,667,543	43.02	169 / 295	▼42	1st	Majority
1993	Kim Campbell	2,178,303	16.04	2 / 295	▼167	▼5th	No status
1997	Jean Charest	2,446,705	18.84	20 / 301	▲18	5th	Fifth party
2000	Joe Clark	1,566,994	12.19	12 / 301	▼8	5th	Fifth party
2003: Merge of the Progressive Conservatives and the Canadian Alliance
2004	Stephen Harper	4,019,498	29.63	99 / 308	▲21 (Note: Compared to Canadian Alliance and Progressive Conservative parties combined.)	2nd	Opposition
2006	Stephen Harper	5,374,071	36.27	124 / 308	▲25	▲1st	Minority
2008	Stephen Harper	5,209,069	37.65	143 / 308	▲19	1st	Minority
2011	Stephen Harper	5,832,401	39.62	166 / 308	▲23	1st	Majority
2015	Stephen Harper	5,578,101	31.89	99 / 338	▼67	▼2nd	Opposition
2019	Andrew Scheer	6,239,227	34.34	121 / 338	▲22	2nd	Opposition
2021	Erin O'Toole	5,747,410	33.74	119 / 338	▼2	2nd	Opposition
2025	Pierre Poilievre	8,113,484	41.31	144 / 343	▲25	2nd	Opposition
