= Environmental policy of the Stephen Harper government =

The environmental policy of the Stephen Harper government was implemented when Stephen Harper was the Prime Minister of Canada from 2006 to 2015, under two minority governments until 2011 when the Conservative Party of Canada won a majority in the 2011 Canadian federal election. During the term of Stephen Harper, Canada's greenhouse gas emissions decreased from 730 to 723 Mt of carbon dioxide equivalent. In contrast, during the period from 1993 until 2006, under various Liberal governments, Canada's greenhouse gas emissions increased 617 to 730 Mt of carbon dioxide equivalent.

The Harper government took credit for the 7 Mt overall reduction in greenhouse gases, while critics claimed that the Harper government was against measures to curb climate change and global warming. Some credit the 2008 financial crisis and the Province of Ontario closing its coal power plants as the reason for the reduction of greenhouse gas emissions during the premiership of Stephen Harper, factors that were outside his control.

== Funding ==
=== Departmental funding ===
The Harper administration reduced funding for environmental research and monitoring by $83.3 million for 2012-2013, by $117.9 million for 2013-2014, and by $180.5 million per year from 2014-2015 onwards. The government has also made significant cuts at Fisheries and Oceans Canada, including cutting $100 million in work related to water protection. The reduced functioning of climate monitoring programmes resulted in gaps in data collection, amongst other effects.

=== Research ===
As part of the 2008 budget on February 26, 2008, $250 million was announced for research in developing more fuel-efficient vehicles and $300 million for the development of a more advanced nuclear reactor and to improve safety at the Chalk River, Ontario nuclear facility which shut down during the fall of 2007 due to safety concerns.

== Environmental research groups ==
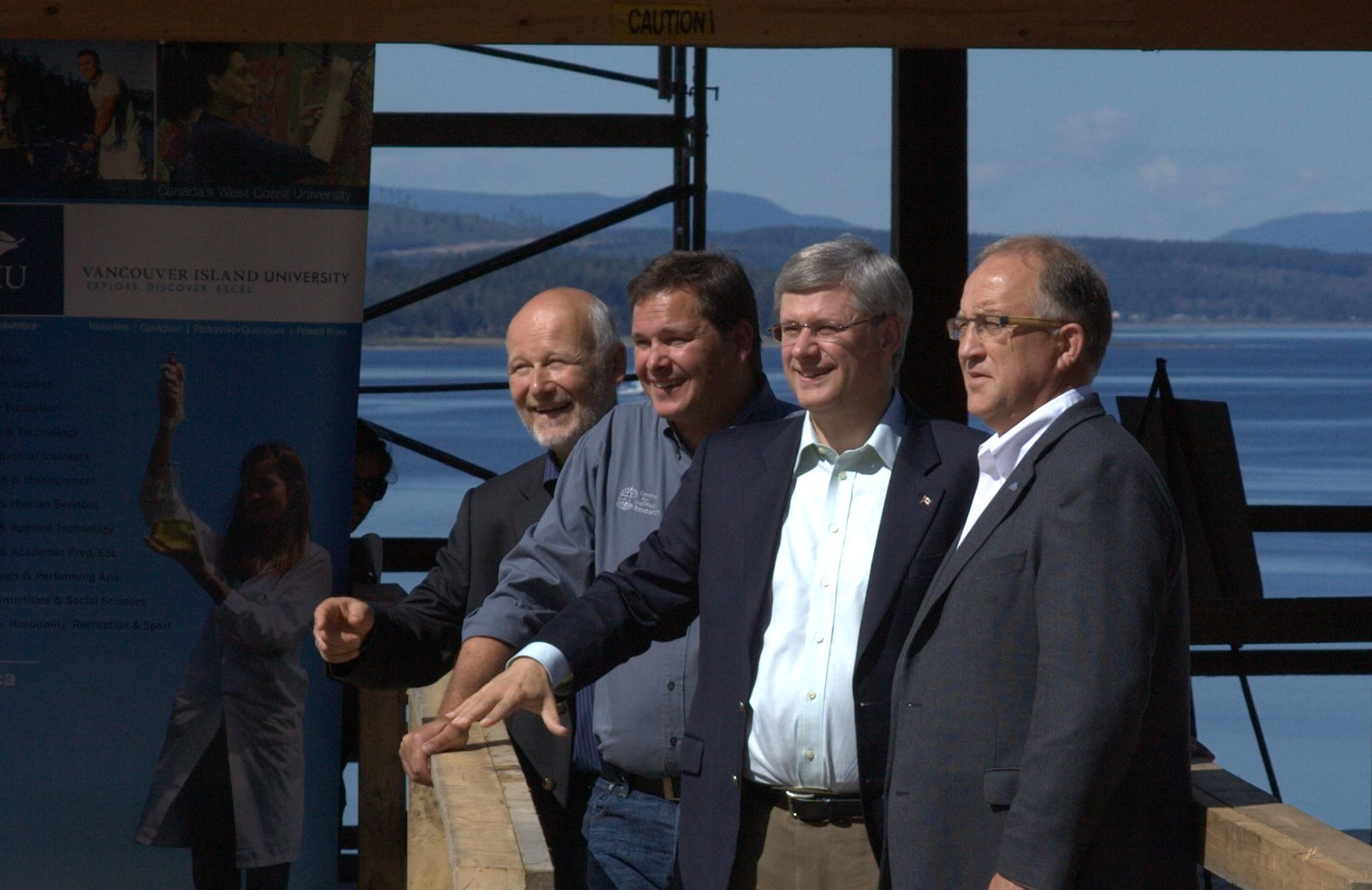
Stephen Harper visited Vancouver Island University's Deep Bay Marine Field Station in 2010

In 2012, the Conservative government revised the Canadian Environmental Assessment Act, reducing its scope to facilitate the approval of projects that would contribute to economic growth. The number of agencies who could conduct environmental reviews was reduced from 40 to three, and approximately 3000 assessments were cancelled due to the reduction in purview. These revisions raised concern among the opposition and environmental groups, who stated the revisions reduced the government’s responsibility towards the environment, “gutting Canada's environmental assessment process.”

For example, the Conservatives have cut funding for the National Round Table on the Environment and the Economy (NRTEE) because the research group promoted carbon taxing. Foreign Affairs Minister John Baird explained the government's position: "Why should taxpayers have to pay for more than 10 reports promoting a carbon tax, something that the people of Canada have repeatedly rejected?"

=== Funding for provinces ===
The previous government pledged funding to several provinces including Ontario and Quebec. Quebec's Environment Minister Claude Béchard vowed to encourage the Tory government to continue with the $328 million funding previously committed for the province. The government announced $1.5 billion for supporting provincial projects including the $328 million Quebec requested.

== Renewable energy ==
=== Lower Churchill Project ===
In 2011, the federal government pledged a loan guarantee towards the Lower Churchill Project in Labrador, which is scheduled for completion in 2017. On April 17, 2013, the 41st Parliament voted in favour of a loan guarantee to Newfoundland and Labrador for the Lower Churchill Project. The Conservative Party of Canada, the Liberal Party of Canada, and the New Democratic Party voted in favour of the loan guarantee. The Green Party of Canada's only MP, Elizabeth May, abstained from voting. The Bloc Québécois voted against the project. The vote passed 271 to 5.

== Media coverage of climate change ==
According to an Environment Canada document, reported by the Montreal Gazette, "Media coverage of climate change science, our most high-profile issue, has been reduced by over 80 per cent" from 2007 to 2010. The Canadian government was accused of "muzzling" its scientists, because journalists needed to file a request to government officials before being allowed to interview scientists, which requests were often denied or only allowed after the news story had already been published by the journalist.

== Position on the Kyoto Accord ==
One prominent policy of the government since its access to power was its position over the Kyoto Accord in which the federal government ratified the Protocol in the late 1990s. The Conservative government had criticized the Accord for having negative impacts on the environment while not providing concrete results as far as greenhouse emission reductions and proposed a new policy which met with criticism from various environmental organizations and the opposition parties.

Harper and the Conservative government criticized the Kyoto Accord on measures to fight against global warming, saying that the economy would be crippled if Canada was forced to meet the Accord's timetable to reduce greenhouse gas emissions. In 2002, Harper wrote a letter to members of the former Canadian Alliance party, mentioning that the Accord is a "socialist conspiracy" and questioning climate science, and in a meeting with other Commonwealth countries in Uganda commented that Kyoto was a mistake that should not be repeated. He also stated that the Accord "focuses on carbon dioxide, which is essential to life, rather than upon pollutants." Harper considered the objectives implemented by Canada to meet its goals were not realistic and later criticized further the accord which did not set any targets for the world's biggest polluters. He proposed a "Made in Canada" plan that would concentrate its efforts on reducing smog pollution from vehicles. In a CTV report in October, however, the Conservatives had mentioned that it would be an approach rather than a plan. While repeatedly mentioning that the goals will not be achieved before the timeline, John Baird mentioned on March 17, 2007, that the government had no plans to abandon the Kyoto Accord. The Conservatives' position has been backed by five independent economists, including Toronto-Dominion Bank chief economist Don Drummond. Drummond, who has been consulted by political parties of all stripes, said that the "economic cost [of implementing Kyoto] would be at least as deep as the recession in the early 1980s", agreeing with the results of a study compiled by the environment department.

Opposition members led by Liberal MP Pablo Rodriguez tabled bill C-288 that would force the government to respect the measures of the Kyoto Accord and forced it to present its measures within 60 days. The bill passed third reading on February 14, 2007, 161-113. The Conservatives had appealed the Speaker of the House, Peter Milliken to make the bill invalid citing it was forcing them to spend money against its will, which was denied. While criticizing the Opposition bill as an empty law without any action plans and not giving authority to spend, Harper announced that he would respect the law, despite earlier threats by the government not to respect it. Toronto-Dominion Bank chief economist Don Drummond dismissed bill C-288 as unworkable. On April 19, 2007, Baird told the Senate of Canada environmental committee that respecting the Kyoto Accord would have a negative impact on the economy, citing that Canada would return to a recession similar to the early 1980s while gas and natural gas prices would skyrocket despite a United Nations report that said that the impact would be minimal.

In the 2007 Throne speech, the government officially abandoned the Kyoto objectives in favour of their policies and accords with Asian and Pacific countries in which Harper joined the US-led the Asia-Pacific Partnership on Clean Development and Climate on September 24, 2007, the United States, China, Japan, India, South Korea and Australia, several among them being among the biggest polluters. The APP's plans goals are lower than the Kyoto Protocol and consists on the introduction of newer and cleaner technology including solar, coal and nuclear power.

The Conservatives withdrew Canada from the Kyoto Protocol in December 2011.

== Clean Air Act ==
On October 10, 2006, in Vancouver, Harper announced tougher measures than the previous Liberal government such as tax credits to environmentally friendly measures, a repackaged air quality health index and a program to retrofit diesel school buses. Harper mentioned that these measures would "move industry from voluntary compliance to strict enforcement; replace the current ad hoc, patchwork system with clear, consistent, and comprehensive national standards, and institute a holistic approach that doesn't treat the related issues of pollutants and greenhouse gas emissions in isolation." Prior to the announcement, activist groups listed a series of recommendations including regulations on big industries and compliance with the Kyoto Protocol.

Details of the Clean Air Act were revealed on October 19, 2006, by Harper along with Environment Minister Rona Ambrose and Transport Minister Lawrence Cannon. Its main plan was to reduce greenhouse emissions at about 45-65% of the 2003 levels. The goal was set for the year 2050 while a decrease of greenhouse emissions would be noticed in 2020. There were also regulations set for vehicle fuel consumption for 2011, while new measures would be set for industries starting in 2010. Finally, oil companies will have to reduce gas emissions for each barrel produced. However, companies can increase their production until 2020. The plan was heavily criticized by opposition parties and several environmental groups, with New Democratic Party leader Jack Layton stating that the act does little to prevent climate change. Since the opposition threatened to turn this into an election issue, the Conservative Party agreed to rework the act.

The Conservatives made a detailed and revised plan called "Turning the Corner" on April 25, 2007, after leaks of a speech which was supposed to be made by John Baird on April 26 were discovered after some Liberal MPs received a fax of the speech. The new plan seeks to stop the increase of greenhouse gas emissions before 2012 and reduce the amount as much as 20% by 2020. Targets would be imposed to industries before 2015, while home appliances would need to be more energy efficient. There were also rewards for companies that reduced the amount of emissions since 2006. On the next day, Baird announced additional measures including one that would force industries to reduce greenhouse emissions by 18 percent by 2010 while auto industries would have a mandatory fuel-efficient standard by 2011. Later in 2007, Baird revealed other plans and deadlines that industries must meet. The plan mentioned that over 700 big-polluter companies, including oil and gas, pulp and paper, electricity and iron and steel companies, will have to reduce green-house emissions by six percent from 2008 to 2010 and will have to report data on their emissions on every May 31.

However, critics including the World Wildlife Fund said that the greenhouse emissions in 2020 would still be higher than the 1990 levels, and Canada would not meet Kyoto targets before 2025, 13 years after its objectives. High-profile figures including David Suzuki and Former US Vice-President Al Gore also criticized the plan as being insufficient.

In 2019, Canada's GHG emissions were 730 Mt compared to 739 Mt in 2005, representing a reduction of only approximately 5%.

== Clean energy technology funding ==
On December 20, 2006, Ambrose and Agriculture Minister Chuck Strahl announced $345 million of funding and other measures to promote the use of biodiesel and ethanol in policies related to the Clean Air Act. Among that, diesel fuel, regular fuel and heating oil would require a small amount of cleaner energy by 2012. Measures also affected farmers in diversifying their agriculture and farming equipment.

On January 17, 2006, Natural Resources Minister Gary Lunn and new Environment Minister John Baird announced an additional $230 million for the development of clean energy technology

Two days later, Harper, Baird and Dunn presented a new program initiative called ecoEnergy Renewable Initiative which would concentrate on the increase of cleaner energy sources such as wind, biomass, small hydro and ocean energies. The cost of the program was about $1.5 billion. Some money was also planned for incentives for companies and industries that would use cleaner energy sources.

On January 21, 2007, the Government announced another related funding announcement by pledging $300 million by helping homeowners across the country by becoming more energy-efficient including cash reward for those implementing measures to improve the efficiency. Critics of the measures such as Friends of Earth Canada and Liberal environment critic David McGuinty, mentioned though that the Conservatives had used some of the programs and strategies planned by opposition parties including a remake of the EnerGuide Program launched by the Liberals.

== Response to climate change report ==
Harper later proposed a discussion with NDP leader Jack Layton in the light of growing concerns made by the United Kingdom government of Tony Blair as well as a report by Sir Nicholas Stern, a former chief economist World Bank who predicted a 20% drop of the global economy. Layton tabled a private member's bill, the Climate Change Accountability Act (Bill C-224), which contained plans to respect Kyoto's targets. After their meeting, they agreed on a formal review of the Clean Air Act.

== Meetings on global warming ==
Harper cancelled a planned meeting on environment with European Union members in Helsinki, Finland, a meeting in which he was expecting to condemn the Kyoto Accord. Harper's director of communications cited that his legislation agenda forced him to withdraw from the meeting. Furthermore, Ambrose attended a two-week November 2006 UN summit meeting in Nairobi, Kenya on the issue of the Kyoto Accord and it targets. Opposition members have claimed that her presence was an embarrassment for Canada.

In late 2007, Harper attended the Commonwealth Summit Meeting in Uganda. While Harper called Kyoto a mistake, he rejected claims that Canada would be a holdout on climate change action. A deal was reached between the 53 members of the organization but blocked a proposal to exclude developing countries to comply to emission reductions. He commented that the deal in Uganda will set the stage for the meeting in Indonesia. John Baird who was also at the meeting mentioned that any agreements would have to include reduction targets in which the biggest polluters such as the United States, China and India must comply. A last-ditch agreement, after difficult discussions, was made late in the Summit which consisted of a two-year plan which would lead to a new treaty replacing the Kyoto Protocol as well as additional negotiations until 2009 that would force countries to set basic parameters of greenhouse reduction goals. Baird, while citing that the last-minute talks were a positive step for a future agreement, stated that he was disappointed that some off the agreement was watered down and that "the deal was almost completely stripped of any reference to numbers and targets that could have been the starting point for the discussion". Climate changes was also a topic at the G8 meeting in Japan in July 2008 where the organization had agreed to fix an objective on reducing greenhouse emissions by 50 cent by 2050 although it was not clear whether the goal was based on either 1990 or current (2008) levels.

== Climate change in the arctic ==
On March 1, 2007, while launching the International Polar Year that a worldwide program that will focus on intense researches on the Arctic regions, including climate change effects, the government announced a $150 million/4 year funding for over 40 projects related to the IPY program. In the 2009 federal budget the government introduced $85 million over two years for key Arctic research stations, and $2 million over two years for a feasibility study for a world-class Arctic research station

== Clean-car rebate ==
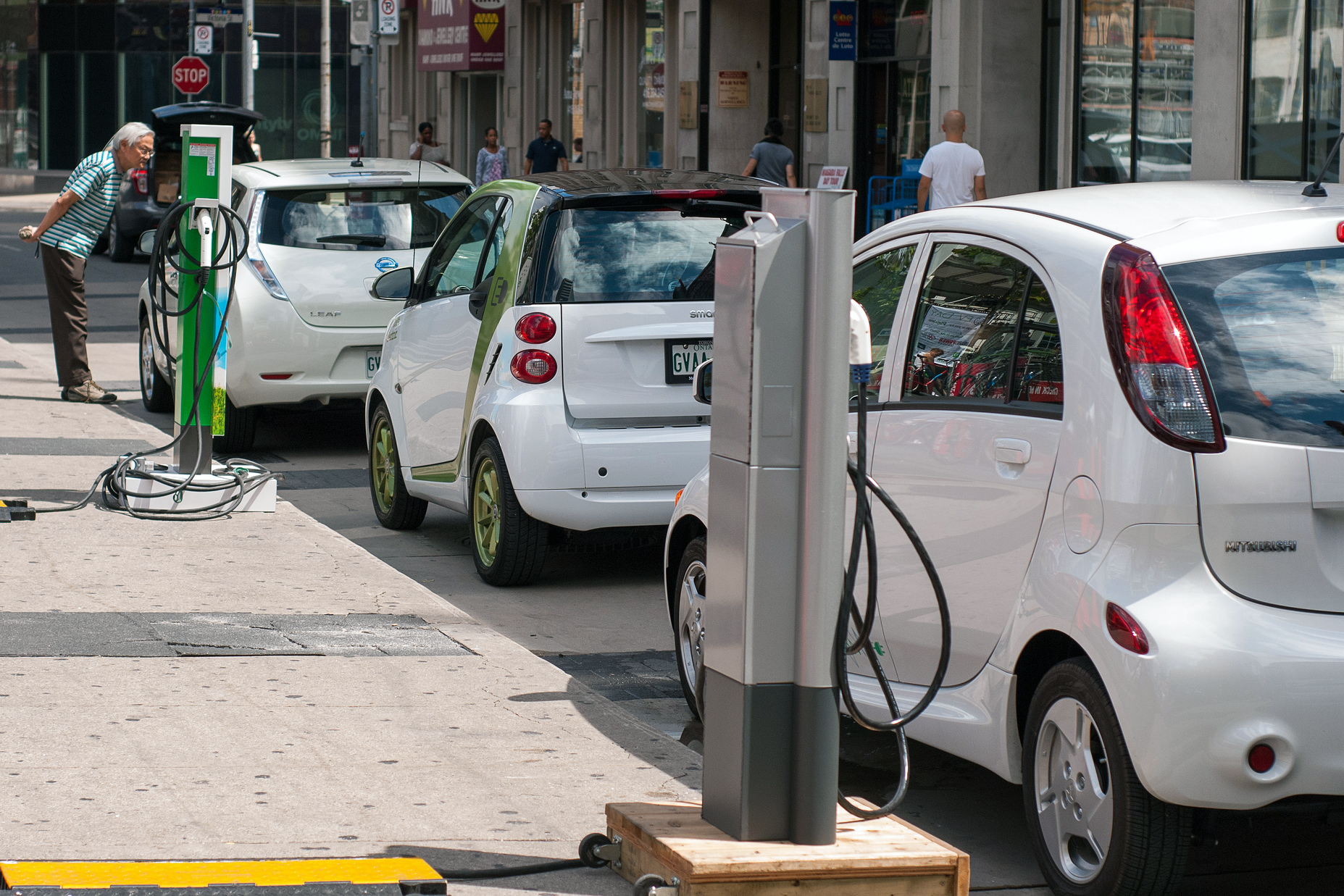
Several electric cars charging in downtown Toronto. From farthest to closest, a Nissan Leaf, a Smart ED, and a Mitsubishi i MiEV.

As part of the 2007 budget on March 19, 2007, Flaherty announced a rebate of up to $2,000 for people who purchase fuel-efficient vehicles. He also announced a new levy to penalize consumers who purchase vehicles with a high-fuel consumption rate: $1,000 for every litre consumed per 100 kilometres would be imposed (up to a total of $4,000) if the vehicle consumes over 13 litres of fuel per 100 kilometres in the city. However the 2008 budget announced the clean-car rebate would be scrapped in 2009.

== Critics ==
Due to the mounted controversy surrounding the Clean Air Act, there were reports according to the Canadian Press that Ambrose would be relieved of her duties as Environment Minister and replaced by Indian Affairs Minister Jim Prentice in a future cabinet shuffle. However, on January 4, 2007, Ambrose was replaced by the President of the Treasury Board John Baird

In 2011, Canada's commissioner of the environment and sustainable development, Scott Vaughan, stated that the government was not only failing to meet Kyoto standards, but also those of other agreements it had signed. He also criticized the Harper government of dramatically lowering its greenhouse gas emission targets since 2007, which have dropped by 90% (from 282 million tonnes to 28 million tonnes).

== See also ==
- Environment of Canada
- Domestic policy of the Stephen Harper government
