= TFSA (disambiguation) =

A TFSA is a tax-free savings account.

TFSA may also refer to:

- Trifluoromethanesulfonic acid, a sulfonic acid
- Turkish-backed Free Syrian Army, an armed Syrian opposition structure
