= Turning the Corner Plan =

Canadian climate change action plan

Turning the Corner Plan is a Canadian climate change action plan introduced by the Harper Conservative Government in April 2007 by then Minister of the Environment John Baird. Turning the Corner has plans set out to reduce Canada's greenhouse gas emissions by 20% relative to 2006 levels by 2020, and reductions of 60 to 70 percent below 2006 levels by 2050.

== Plan ==
=== Emissions intensity ===
The plan which mainly starts in 2010 uses intensity based targets for industry, which will start in 2010. All covered industrial sectors will be required to reduce their emissions intensity from 2006 levels by 18% by 2010, with 2% continuous improvement every year after that.

=== Components of the plan ===
The main components of the action plan are as follows

- a regulatory framework for industrial emissions of greenhouse gases and air pollutants;
- the development of a mandatory fuel-efficiency standard for automobiles, beginning with the 2011 model year, as well as action to reduce emissions from the rail, marine, and aviation sectors, and from on-road and off-road vehicles and engines;
- the implementation of new energy performance standards to strengthen existing energy-efficiency standards for a number of products that consume electricity, including light bulbs, in order to reduce emissions from the use of consumer and commercial products; and
- the development of measures to improve indoor air quality.

== Criticism ==
The Turning the Corner action plan has received a large amount of criticism from many environmental groups and opposition political parties, because it fails to meet Canada's Kyoto Protocol targets. It has also been criticized for having weak goals and some say that the use of Emissions Intensity targets will in the long run allow emissions to increase.

== Provincial plans ==
Despite the fact that the federal government released a national emissions reduction plan most provinces have set out their own goals for 2020. Ontario has a goal of 15% below 1990 levels by 2020, Quebec has a goal of 20% below 1990 levels by 2020, and British Columbia has a plan that will reduce its emissions 33% below 2007 levels by 2020, other provinces have goals however they are similar to the federal goals. Alberta is the only province that has a plan that will let emissions rise until 2020 at which time Alberta's emissions will begin to decrease to 14% below the provinces 2005 levels by 2050.

== Climate policy changes ==
After the 2008 Federal Election, Jim Prentice took over as Minister of the Environment replacing John Baird. There have not been many new developments in climate change policy since Baird initially released the plan. However, in December 2009 Jim Prentice announced that Canada would not be using intensity based targets, and that Canada would use absolute targets, something many critics have wanted, this will ensure that emissions get reduced.
