= 2008 Canadian federal budget =

2008 Budget of the Canadian Federal Government
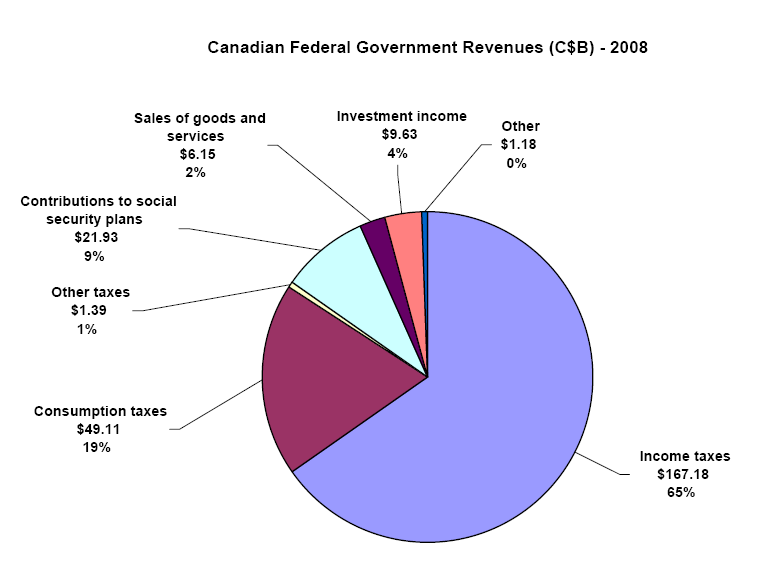
- Presented: 27 February 2008
- Country: Canada
- Parliament: 39th
- Party: Conservative
- Finance minister: Jim Flaherty
- Total revenue: C$236.4 billion^{‡}
- Total expenditures: C$237.4 billion
- Program spending: C$206.76 billion
- Debt payment: C$30.7 billion
- Deficit: C$5.8 billion
- Debt: C$458.7 billion
- Website: http://www.budget.gc.ca/2008/pdf/plan-eng.pdf Responsible Leadership
- ^{‡}Numbers in italics are projections.

The Canadian federal budget for the 2008–09 fiscal year was presented to the House of Commons of Canada by Finance Minister Jim Flaherty on February 26, 2008.

The budget included a surplus of $10.2 billion to be applied to pay down federal debt, and the introduction of the Tax-Free Savings Account (TFSA). The government announced there would be little to no new tax breaks as major tax cuts took place in the economic update during the fall of 2007 in anticipation of economic slowdowns in 2008. It was to be the last budget of the Conservative government's first term in office.

The budget was deemed ordinary and uncontroversial by the press. The Liberal party had pledged not to push for an election in the spring of 2008, and so guaranteed their support for the budget. The Bloc Québécois had submitted a long list of budgetary demands to be met, which effectively eliminated them from budget negotiations. They voted against the budget.

== Highlights ==
The 2008 budget was tabled on February 26, 2008. No new tax cuts were announced in the budget, but Finance Minister Jim Flaherty announced the creation of a new Tax-Free Savings Account, into which an individual can deposit up to $5,000 a year. Flaherty said that it is the "single most important savings vehicle since the introduction of the RRSP". The TFSA was touted as a badly needed addition to the Canadian tax system as it did not make sense for low income earners and seniors to make use of existing savings programs with tax incentives, such as RRSPs. In contrast, the TFSA could be used by such demographics to enjoy savings with tax benefits.

Funding was also announced for public transit, infrastructures, hiring new police officers, the reconstruction of Afghanistan, a new Student Grant Program (replacing the Millennium Scholarship Fund) and for the manufacturing sectors. In addition, the government announced the creation of a new independent crown corporation to administer the Employment Insurance System while gas tax rebate fund to the cities was made permanent. 10.2 billion dollars will be spent on the payment of the national debt.

== Reception ==
As did in the past, the 2008 Conservative budget was met with mixed reactions. Liberal leader Stéphane Dion, while criticizing the budget as modest and being "one mile wide" and "one inch deep", said that the party will support the budget due to measures announced surrounding the manufacturing sector as well as environment due to avoiding a spring election. Both the Bloc Québécois and the NDP announced that they were voting against the budget.

The NDP argued that the budget failed to address the need for average workers while the winners were banks, polluting industries and the well-off. Social programs got one-time commitments while corporate tax cuts were granted for many years. They further mentioned that tax cuts for big business were larger than new spending by a ratio of 6 to 1.

The Bloc criticized insufficient funding for the forestry sector the lack of major announcements for the province of Quebec.

Ontario Finance Minister Dwight Duncan believed that the budget came short in regards to the manufacturing sector and claimed that it was a "missed opportunity for Ontario and Ottawa to work together during a tough economic period". Buzz Hargrove from the Canadian Auto Workers Union argued that the budget was a step in the wrong direction for the auto industry as well. Quebec Finance Minister Monique Jerome-Forget also criticized the budget by saying that it does not reflect the priorities for Quebec including the province's forest sector and post-secondary education. The Minister did praised however the permanency of gas tax rebate for the municipalities.

Canadian Taxpayers Federation director John Williamson mentioned and applauded that the registered savings plan was "very good" for the middle class. Economist Andrew Jackson, from the Canadian Labour Congress, mentioned however that the plan will give little to the average worker while Don Scott, a taxation specialist, added that the program may incite some investors to contribute less to their RRSP. The creation of the new savings account also had positive reviews from several Canadian newspapers including Le Devoir, La Presse, The Globe and Mail and the National Post. Aaron Freeman, policy director for the Environmental Defence, criticized the government for having no clear direction on the environment making reference to the suspension after 2008 of the tax-rebate program on fuel-efficient vehicles but praised the funding for transit and for the protection of consumers from toxins in products.

== McTeague private member bill ==
Liberal MP Dan McTeague tabled a Private Member's Bill that would give parents substantial tax breaks for saving education money; taxpayers who deposited $5,000 into a RESP for their children's post-secondary education would earn a $5,000 tax deduction, similar to the deduction allowed for contributions to a RRSP. Under the Tax-Free Savings Account, introduced in Conservative Finance Minister Jim Flaherty's 2008 budget, there was no deduction for annual contributions.

Though McTeague's bill passed through the House of Commons of Canada on March 5, 2008, after Speaker of the House, Liberal Peter Milliken, approved the bill for debate, it is constitutionally decreed that any money measure that does not have royal recommendation, that is, if it doesn't originate from the Crown, is to be considered unlawful. So, any private member's money bill must be regarded as a Motion of Confidence. Flaherty served notice to the House of Commons on March 11 that he would introduce a motion to nullify the bill by including a provision to do so in legislation implementing the federal budget, which is automatically a confidence motion. The RESP bill was the first time since 1840 that the Commons had attempted to force a change to the government's budget.
