= 2006 Canadian federal budget =

Canadian government budget for 2006–07

2006 Budget of the Canadian Federal Government
C-13
- Presented: 2 May 2006
- Passed: 6 June 2006
- Country: Canada
- Parliament: 39th
- Party: Conservative
- Finance minister: Jim Flaherty
- Total revenue: C$236 billion
- Total expenditures: C$222.2 billion
- Program spending: C$188.3 billion
- Debt payment: C$33.9 billion
- Surplus: C$13.8 billion
- Debt: C$467.3 billion
- Website: Focusing on Priorities

The Canadian federal budget for the fiscal year 2006–07, was presented to the House of Commons of Canada by Finance Minister Jim Flaherty on May 2, 2006. Among the most notable elements of the federal budget were its reduction of the Goods and Services Tax by one percentage point, income tax cuts for middle-income earners, and $1,200-per-child childcare payment (the Universal child care benefit) for Canadian parents.

Prime Minister Stephen Harper called the bill an indication of what Canadians should expect from his Conservative minority government. Many aspects of the bill were criticized by opposition parties. The Liberal Party and New Democratic Party indicated that they would not support the budget, while the Bloc Québécois indicated that it would vote in favour of it.

On June 6, 2006, the budget was introduced for a third reading in the House of Commons. Amid an apparent mix-up, no Members of Parliament rose to speak. Thus, the budget was declared passed by unanimous consent a week ahead of schedule. (Note: The proceedings from June 6th included some confused comments by MPs and clarifications by Deputy Speaker Bill Blaikie confirming that the Bill C-13 had been passed: Order, please. There seems to be some confusion in the House. It is my understanding that the bill to which the hon. member is speaking is Bill C-13 which was just passed. We have now moved to debate on Bill C-10. [...] It may have been the intention of some members [to debate a third reading] but before I took the Chair I observed what I thought to be the passage of Bill C-13 without any dissent, or division for that matter. I believe the matter has now been decided. [...] The Speaker did call for debate when the question was put on third reading and no one rose. The question was then put on third reading and the bill was carried without dissent or division. It sometimes happens in the House that the intentions people have do not always fully manifest themselves. — Bill Blaikie, Deputy Speaker of the House of Commons)

== Highlights ==
Initiatives to be delivered over periods ranging from one to five years:

- $1.1 billion for the Canadian Forces.
- $2 billion in general spending cuts.
- The creation of the Canada Employment Credit, a tax credit to be worth approximately $155 per employed Canadian by 2007.
- $1 billion for emergency preparedness, specifically against a potential flu pandemic.
- A decrease (in law) in the lowest income tax rate from 16% to 15.25% for 2006, and then to 15.5% for subsequent years. (Note: Bill C-80, introduced by the Liberal government six days before the dissolution of the 38th Parliament, proposed to decrease the lowest income tax rate from 16% to 15% and increase the personally basic amount by $500 effective January 2005. This bill only passed the first reading and was not law. According to convention, changes to tax laws are implemented as soon as announced by the government, even if applicable legislation has not yet been passed through Parliament. Thus, the Canada Revenue Agency implemented the changes while parliament was dissolved.)
- Increases to the amount that an individual can earn before paying personal income tax from about $8,300 to $10,000 by 2010.
- A reduction of the general corporate income tax rate from 21% in 2007 to 19% in 2010, and elimination of the 3% corporate income surtax after 2006.
- $160 million for hiring new police officers at the Royal Canadian Mounted Police.
- $3 billion to reduce the government's debt.
- No funding for the Kyoto Protocol.
- No funding for the Kelowna Accord.
- $150 million in new taxes on income trusts.

== Taxes ==
=== GST rate cut ===
The Conservative government promised to lower the federal Goods and Services Tax from 7% to 6% in its first budget and to lower it to 5% by 2011. During the 2006 election campaign, the Martin government proposed income tax cuts for lower-middle-income earners. The Liberals claimed that the GST cut would effectively result in a tax increase for those in the lower-middle-income bracket. The Conservatives argued that the GST cuts would benefit all Canadians, including low-income earners and those outside the workforce who do not pay income tax.

The first GST cut went into effect on July 1, 2006, and no provinces have raised provincial sales tax as a demonstrable result. Nova Scotia raised the provincial sales tax 2 points as part of deficit-fighting measures under the Dexter government; this was put in place on July 1, 2010. The second cut was later announced in the 2007 Throne Speech and officially confirmed on October 30, 2007 during an economic statement update on the country finances.

== Reactions ==
The budget was met with dissent by the Liberal and New Democratic parties and mostly positive reception from the Bloc. The Liberals and NDP voiced disapproval over the Conservatives following through on their election promise to replace the Liberals' child care policy with their own, and for replacing Canada's $4 billion environmental policy with a $2 billion "made in Canada" plan of their design. The budget received widespread support among the business community and polling indicated that a clear majority of Canadians approved of the budget.

== Aftermath ==
=== Legislative history ===
While it initially appeared that the only way the Conservatives' budget would pass would be with the support of the Bloc Québécois, the budget passed third reading without dissent on June 6, 2006, when the members of the Opposition failed to stand after the Deputy Speaker of the House called for debate. Because there were no speakers for the Opposition, the budget was declared passed with unanimous support and no recorded vote and thus forwarded to the Senate for approval. This marked the first time in Canadian Parliamentary history where a government's budget passed unanimously on the third and final reading.

=== Execution ===
On September 25, 2006, the Conservative government announced that within the fiscal year, there was a $13.2 billion surplus that will be used to pay down the country's debt.

=== Income Trusts Controversy ===
Economist Yves Fortin challenged the reasons for the change in tax regime announced by Flaherty and disputed the Harper-government assertion that the Trust structure led to a loss of tax revenue because of trust conversions in his research paper. Analyst Gordon Tait also raised concerns about the lack of consultation and misconceptions surrounding the change in tax policy on Trusts in The Inconvenient Truth About Trusts.

Analyst Cameron Renkas refuted the Department of Finance's assertion that the United States and Australia took action to shut down flow-through structures. In his research paper, Digging Deeper, he gave a perspective on how the United States taxes publicly traded flow-through entities and Master limited partnerships, the US equivalent of Canadian Income Trusts.

In a January 12, 2007 paper, Yves Fortin outlined his concerns regarding the claim of tax leakage. In his October 31, 2006 policy statement, Finance Minister Jim Flaherty said, "If left unchecked, these corporate decisions would result in billions of dollars in less tax revenue for the federal government to invest in the priorities of Canadians, including more personal income tax relief" but Minister Flaherty did not document his allegation or cite any research to back up his claim. Mr. Fortin's paper A Recipe For Tax Loss gave several examples of how the tax on income trusts could lead to a loss in government tax revenue, not a gain.

Analyst Dirk Lever wrote on January 15, 2007, "We cannot understand why any Canadians would support double taxation of retirement benefits - it affects all of us eventually." Mr. Lever also cited several flaws in the Conservative government's policy in his research paper Deep Dive into Tax Issues: Canadian Pensioners Taxed Twice on Canadian Corporate Dividends. In the report, Mr. Lever asked:

- Why are Canadian Pension Benefits are taxed twice on Canadian Corporate Dividends?
- Why are foreign investors allowed more favorable tax treatment than Canadian retail investors?

Special hearings by the Finance Committee commenced January 30, 2007. John McCallum, the Liberal Finance critic called on Minister Flaherty to explain the reasoning behind the change in Income Trust Tax policy. In a February 8, 2007 news release, John McCallum is quoted as saying, "essentially they released close to a thousand pages of public documents, not one of which brings Canadians any closer to understanding what type of information or calculations led the Minister to break his election promise and tax income trusts, either the Minister is in contempt of the committee’s motion or he had absolutely no data from his own department before shutting down the sector and destroying tens of thousands of Canadians’ life savings. The first possibility is disturbing, the second is deplorable." The Conservatives had the support of the Jack Layton and the NDP on this issue.

The government postponed the tax from taking effect until 2011 for existing trusts. The government argued that it could now allow giant corporations to convert as proposed by BCE for its Bell Canada subsidiary, "...a move that would save it $800 million in tax by 2008." Subsequent to the October 31 announcement by Flaherty, the TSX Capped Energy Trust Index lost 21.8% in market value and the TSX Capped Income Trust Index lost 17.6% in market value by mid November 2006. In contrast, the TSX Capped REIT Index, which is exempt from the "Tax Fairness Plan," gained 3.2% in market value. According to the Canadian Association of Income Funds, this translated into a permanent loss in savings of $30 billion to Canadian Income Trust Investors. Harper later mentioned that this was "the toughest decision for the government." The Canadian Press voted the Harper Government and Jim Flaherty "Business Newsmaker of 2006" for the announcement to tax Income Trusts on Halloween.

In a July 9, 2007 interview on Business News Network, former Conservative Alberta Premier Ralph Klein criticized PM Stephen Harper and Finance Minister Jim Flaherty for their mishandling of the Income Trust issue and for not keeping their word on Income Trust taxation. According to the Canadian Association of Income Trust Investors, the change in tax rules cost investors $35 billion in market value. Stephen Harper specifically promised "not to raid Senior's nest eggs" during the 2006 Federal Election.

== See also ==
- Domestic policy of the Harper government

== Notes and references ==
=== References ===
==== Budget documents ====
- The Budget Plan 2006 (PDF). Ottawa. May 2, 2006.
- The Budget Speech 2006 (PDF). Ottawa. May 2, 2006.
- The Budget in Brief 2006 (PDF). Ottawa. May 2, 2006.

==== Enacted legislations ====
- An Act to implement certain provisions of the budget tabled in Parliament on May 2, 2006, S.C. 2006, c. 4
