= 2015 Canadian federal budget =

2015 Budget of the Canadian Federal Government
- Presented: 21 April 2015
- Country: Canada
- Parliament: 41st
- Party: Conservative
- Finance minister: Joe Oliver
- Total revenue: 290.3 billion (Projected); 295.5 billion (Actual)
- Total expenditures: 288.9 billion (Projected); 298.3 billion (Actual)
- Surplus: 1.4 billion (Projected)
- Deficit: 2.9 billion (Actual)
- Website: http://www.budget.gc.ca/2015/docs/download-telecharger/index-eng.html

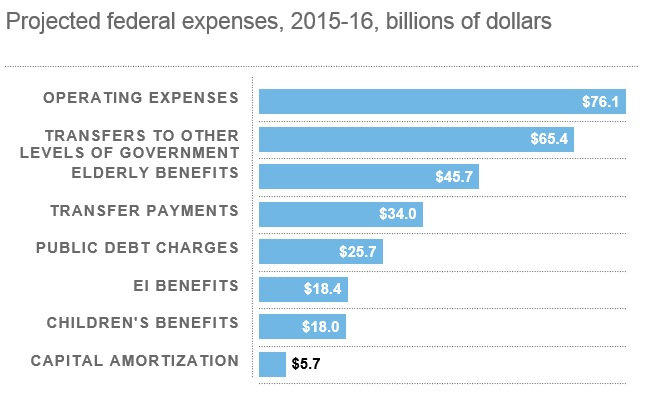
Projected expenses for the fiscal year 2015–16

The Canadian federal budget for fiscal year 2015–16 was presented to the House of Commons of Canada by Joe Oliver on 21 April 2015. This was the last budget before the 2015 federal election. The budget was supposed to be presented in February or March before the fiscal year began on April 1, but was delayed because of the steep drop in oil prices in the winter of 2014–15. A surplus of $1.4 billion was projected for the fiscal year 2015-2016, however this was adjusted by the new government to a deficit of $1.0 billion by end of March 2016. This was later adjusted to $2.9 billion after reflecting a change requested by the Auditor General dating back 10 years' worth of federal budgets, specifically with regard to the discount rate methodology used to determine the present value of the Government's unfunded pension obligations.

== Programs ==
=== Child care ===
The Universal Child Care Benefit will be increased to $1,920 per year for each child under the age of 6, and will introduce a new benefit of up to $720 per year for children aged 6 through 17. This measure will be paid for in part by the elimination of the existing Child Tax Credit.

=== Seniors ===
The budget will lower the minimum annual withdrawal rate for seniors from their Registered Retirement Income Fund. The minimal withdrawal rate starts at 7.38% at age 71 and increases to 20% by age 94. The budget would lower the rate for those aged 71 to 5.28% to start, and will lower the rate to 18.79% by age 94. The budget also announces a new Home Accessibility Tax Credit of up to $1,500 for the cost of home renovations for seniors or people with disabilities.

The government is proposing to extend the Employment Insurance Compassionate Care leave from six weeks to six months for Canadians caring for gravely ill family members.

=== Security and defence ===
The budget will spend $439 million from 2015 to 2019 on various national security measures, including counterterrorism programs at the Royal Canadian Mounted Police and the Canadian Security Intelligence Service (CSIS), increased Parliament Hill security, and an extra $2 million a year for the Security Intelligence Review Committee to enhance its oversight of CSIS's expanded operations.

The federal government will also spend $360 million in 2015 on its deployment in Iraq and $7.1 million to train Ukraine's security forces.

The military budget will be increased by $1.1 billion over three years starting in fiscal year 2017–18, from $20 billion in 2014–15. Ottawa is raising to from 2% to 3% the yearly escalator clause in the Department of National Defence's budget.

=== Public transit ===
In the budget is a proposal for a new approach to mass transit capital funding that would be based on long-term loans and private sector involvement. The government will establish the Public Transit Fund that would start at $250 million in 2017–18 and grow to $1 billion a year by 2019–20. The government states municipalities could borrow from this fund. Previously, the federal government had provided 1/3 of the capital funding for infrastructure projects. The fund is not established by the budget.

=== Manufacturing investments ===
The budget also provides $100 million over five years to help auto parts makers develop new products.

=== Post-secondary grants ===
The government is putting an extra $1.3 billion over six years into the Canada Foundation for Innovation, which provides grants for research infrastructure, mainly at colleges and universities.

== Taxes ==
=== Couples ===
The budget proposes to allow parents to split their income for tax purposes, which is expected to reduce tax revenues by $4.5 billion a year.

=== Small businesses ===
The government proposes to reduce the corporate income tax rate on businesses with less than $500,000 in annual income from 11% to 9% in 2019. This is expected to reduce tax revenues $1.2 billion a year when it is fully implemented.

=== Agricultural businesses ===
The government proposes to increase the lifetime capital gains exemption for farmers and fishing businesses from $800,000 to $1 million for all property sold on or after budget day.

=== Manufacturing ===
The government had introduced a temporary tax break during the Great Recession to encourage manufacturers to write off part of the cost of modernizing machinery and equipment over a short period of time. The accelerated Capital Cost Allowance has been repeatedly extended since 2007. This budget proposes to extend the measure until 2024, reducing government tax revenues by up to $360 million a year.

=== Banking ===
The budget proposes to close a loophole used by financial institutions on derivatives contracts, that the government estimates will generate as much as $365 million in the current fiscal year and $1.24 billion over the next four years. Banks would no longer be able to claim an income-tax deduction on dividends paid by Canadian companies under certain derivatives contracts. These "synthetic equity arrangements" have the "potential to significantly erode the Canadian tax base" according to the budget document.

== Civil service reforms ==
The government will save an estimated $900 million this year by targeting a "failing" and "antiquated" system that allows federal bureaucrats to bank their sick days. The government wants to replace the existing practice with a formal disability plan by collective bargaining. If negotiations fail, the government will implement a modernized sick leave and disability regime "within a reasonable time frame".
