= Tax-free savings account =

Registered tax free savings plan for Canadians

A tax-free savings account (TFSA, French: Compte d'épargne libre d'impôt, CELI) is an account available in Canada that provides tax benefits for saving. Investment income, including capital gains and dividends, earned in a TFSA is not taxed in most cases, even when withdrawn. Contributions to a TFSA are not deductible for income tax purposes, unlike contributions to a registered retirement savings plan (RRSP).

Despite the name, a TFSA does not have to be a cash savings account. Like an RRSP, a TFSA may contain cash and/or other eligible investments such as mutual funds, segregated funds, certain stocks, bonds, or guaranteed investment certificates (GICs). Interest collected by cash on hand in a TFSA is tax free.

== History ==
The first tax-free savings account was introduced by Jim Flaherty, then Canadian federal Minister of Finance, in the 2008 federal budget. It came into effect on January 1, 2009.

This measure was supported by the C. D. Howe Institute, which stated; "This tax policy gem is very good news for Canadians, and Mr. Flaherty and his government deserve credit for a novel program". Furthermore, the Canadian Federation of Independent Business, Canadian Bankers Association, Bank of Montreal economist Doug Porter, the Canadian Chamber of Commerce, and the Canadian Taxpayers Federation also supported this tax policy.

== Canadian features ==
A TFSA is an account in which Canadian residents 18 years and older with a valid SIN can save or invest. Income or capital gains earned on contributions is not taxed. The TFSA account-holder may withdraw money from the account at any time, free of taxes. The amount withdrawn can be replaced, subject to the TFSA contribution room rules.

=== Contribution room ===
The maximum annual contribution room for each year prior to 2013 was $5,000 per year. Beginning in 2013 it was increased to $5,500 per year. The $5,500 annual contribution limit was indexed to the consumer price index (CPI), in $500 increments, in order to account for inflation.

The 2015 federal budget raised the contribution limit to $10,000, and eliminated indexation for inflation, beginning with the 2015 tax year. However, in December 2015 a newly elected government proposed to restore the pre-2015 contribution limit of $5,500 for 2016, to be indexed for inflation after that.

As of January 1, 2026, the total cumulative contribution room for a TFSA is $109,000 for those who have been 18 years or older and residents of Canada for all eligible years. Canadian residents may only begin accumulating contribution room once they have reached the age of 18. Upon turning 18, one can contribute up to the maximum allowed limit for that year. Annual contribution limits for subsequent years are accumulated in one's total contribution room.

Years	TFSA Annual Limit	Cumulative Total
2009–2012	$5,000	$20,000
2013–2014	$5,500	$31,000
2015	$10,000	$41,000
2016–2018	$5,500	$57,500
2019–2022	$6,000	$81,500
2023	$6,500	$88,000
2024–2026	$7,000	$109,000

Any unused contribution room under the cap can be carried forward to subsequent years, without any upward limit.

=== Eligible investments ===
A TFSA can hold any investments that are RRSP-eligible, including publicly traded shares on eligible exchanges, eligible shares of private corporations, certain debt obligations, instalment receipts, money denominated in any currency, trust interests including mutual funds and real estate investment trusts, annuity contracts, warrants, rights and options, registered investments, royalty units, partnership units, and depository receipts.

=== Creditor protection ===
Assets within a TFSA are not protected from creditors in the event of bankruptcy or a financial judgement that results from legal proceedings against the account-holder, whereas those within an RRSP are protected, with exceptions. Creditor protection may only be applied to assets within a TFSA if they are held in a segregated fund with an insurance company.

=== Reporting ===
Because a TFSA does not generate any taxable income, and contributions are not tax-deductible, the account normally has no bearing on individual tax returns and therefore contributors will not receive any tax slips / receipts in connection with a TFSA, provided they are not U.S. citizens or residents (as discussed below). However, contributions and account balances are reported annually to the Canada Revenue Agency (CRA). Contributors are responsible for tracking their own contributions to ensure they don't exceed applicable limits, as discussed in the next section.

=== Over-contributions ===
A withdrawal in any year will increase the available contribution room, not in the year of withdrawal, but on January 1 of the following year. An over-contribution will occur if an individual (whose TFSA contributions have already been maximized) mistakenly believes that a withdrawal immediately creates contribution room and re-contributes the withdrawn funds later the same calendar year. At any time in the year, if an individual contributes more than their allowable TFSA contribution room, they will be considered to be over-contributing to their TFSA and will be subject to a tax equal to 1% of the highest excess TFSA amount in the month, for each month that the excess amount remains in their account.

In the 2012 tax year, the CRA sent notices to about 74,000 taxpayers about TFSA over-contributions, out of about nine million TFSAs existing at the end of 2012. About 76,000 notices were sent in 2011 and 103,000 in 2010.

=== Foreign dividend withholding tax ===
Unlike an RRSP, a TFSA is not considered by the United States Internal Revenue Service to be a pension plan. Therefore, the exemption from U.S. withholding tax on dividends in registered pension plans under the tax treaty between the U.S. and Canada does not apply to TFSA accounts, subjecting Canadians in most cases to a 15% U.S. tax withheld on dividends paid on shares of U.S. corporations. The tax withheld cannot be credited against other payable taxes as would be the case with non-registered accounts.

To get around this problem certain contracts may be offered to replicate the return of the underlying dividend-paying stocks in a fund without actually holding any of those stocks. However, due to the fees charged by the counterparty to the swap agreement, as well as the fund's own management fee, its expenses exceed the actual withholding tax payable for the underlying stocks, if those were to be held directly in the TFSA.

=== Risks for U.S. citizens and U.S. residents ===
Canadian mutual funds held in TFSAs are generally considered by the IRS to be investments in a passive foreign investment company (PFIC), and must be reported as such (on form 8621) by U.S. citizens. PFICs can be very disadvantageous as, absent certain elections, "excess" distributions are always taxed at the highest marginal rate. Also, income is averaged over the duration of the investment, and interest is then charged from the date the income is deemed to have occurred, resulting in effective tax rates as high as 50% or more. A TFSA may also be a grantor foreign trust from the perspective of the U.S. U.S. citizens with a grantor foreign trust are required to file IRS Forms 3520A (due March 15) and 3520 (due at the same time as Form 1040). These forms are both complicated and both involve potentially large penalties for late filing. Like other non-U.S. accounts, a TFSA may also need to be included on a U.S. citizen's foreign bank account report (FBAR) and tax-FBAR. Earnings inside a TFSA are taxed by the U.S.

== Comparison to RRSP ==
The tax treatment of a TFSA is the opposite of a registered retirement savings plan (RRSP). Unregistered accounts are subject to tax and hold after-tax money, the TFSA is described as a tax-free account holding after-tax money, and the RRSP is described as a tax-deferred account holding pre-tax money that will be taxed on withdrawal. There is an income tax deduction for contributions to an RRSP, and withdrawals of contributions and investment income are all taxable. In contrast, there is no tax deduction for contributions to a TFSA. Additionally, withdrawals of investment income or contributions from the account are not taxed.

Unlike an RRSP, which must be converted to a registered retirement income fund (RRIF) when the holder turns 71, a TFSA does not expire.

If an account-holder withdraws funds from a TFSA, his or her contribution room is increased by that amount on January 1 after the withdrawal. In an RRSP, the contribution room is not increased to reflect withdrawals.

The CRA describes the difference between a TFSA and an RRSP as follows: "An RRSP is primarily intended for retirement. A TFSA is like an RRSP for everything else in your life." Interest paid on money borrowed to invest in either TFSA or RRSP is not tax deductible.

== Similar accounts in other countries ==
A TFSA is similar to a Roth individual retirement account in the United States, although a TFSA has no withdrawal restrictions, such as the unqualified withdrawal penalty of the Roth IRA. In the UK, similar tax advantages have been available in personal equity plans and individual savings accounts since 1986.

In South Africa, Tax Free Investment accounts were launched on March 1, 2015.

== See also ==
- Taxation in Canada
- Registered retirement savings plan
- Registered education savings plan
- First Home Savings Account
