= Kelowna Accord =

The Kelowna Accord is a series of agreements between the Government of Canada, First Ministers of the Provinces, Territorial Leaders, and the leaders of five national Aboriginal organizations in Canada. The accord sought to improve the education, employment, and living conditions for Aboriginal peoples through governmental funding and other programs. The accord was never endorsed by Prime Minister Stephen Harper, who had replaced Paul Martin.

== History ==
The agreement resulted from 18 months of roundtable consultations leading up to the First Ministers' Meeting in Kelowna, British Columbia in November 2005 and was described in a paper released at the end of the meeting entitled "First Ministers and National Aboriginal Leaders Strengthening Relationships and Closing the Gap" and a separate press release, issued by the Prime Minister's Office at the close of the Kelowna meetings. The Quebec Aboriginals were not included in this final accord, as they did not participate in the process.

The term "Kelowna Accord" was never used at the First Ministers' Meeting. The term seems to have first been used in a Toronto Star article dated December 4, 2005.

Aboriginal leaders saw the accord as a step forward, as it involved a process of cooperation and consultation that brought all parties to the table.

The press release issued by the Office of the Prime Minister on the November 25, 2005 outlined $5.085 billion in spending over 5 years, but did not set out the means for the fiscal distribution between federal departments, provincial and territorial governments, and Aboriginal groups.

With the support of the NDP, led by Jack Layton, the official opposition Conservatives, led by Stephen Harper, voted against the Liberal minority government of Paul Martin resulting in the 2006 federal election. The subsequent federal election resulted in a Conservative minority government headed by Stephen Harper. When presenting their first budget on May 2, 2006, the Conservatives indicated that they were committed to meeting the targets set out at the First Ministers' Meeting in Kelowna and the working paper therein produced, but that they did not agree with the approach taken in the funding announcement set out in the former Prime Minister's press release. Rather, focused initiatives and targeted expenditures, coupled with systemic reform, were laid out as the new government's direction.

In June 2006, former Prime Minister Paul Martin introduced a private member's bill, Bill C-292 An Act to Implement the Kelowna Accord calling on the government to follow through on the agreements made in the Kelowna Accord.

During testimony before the Standing Committee on Aboriginal Affairs and Northern Development it was disputed whether or not an accord had been formally signed and whether or not money had been budgeted for its implementation. Former Prime Minister Paul Martin and former Minister of Finance Ralph Goodale testified that the $5 billion described in the press release was in fact booked in the Sources and Uses Table, an internal Department of Finance document.

On March 21, 2007, the bill was passed by in the house, while the majority of the Conservative MP`s voted against it. However, as section 54 of the Constitution Act, 1867, this private member's bill was mostly symbolic as it cannot contain expenditure of public funds.

Former Canadian Assembly of First Nations Chief Phil Fontaine has argued repeatedly for the implementation of the Kelowna Accord. He had called the deal a breakthrough for his people. Mary Simon, then-President of Inuit Tapiriit Kanatami, the national organization representing the Inuit of Canada, said Harper had put Inuit issues on ice, and that Harper had not implemented any element of the Kelowna accord.

The goal of the education investments was to ensure that the high school graduation rate of Aboriginal Canadians matched the rest of the population. The money was also aimed at cutting in half the gap in rates of post-secondary graduation.

On health, targets were established to reduce infant mortality, youth suicide, childhood obesity and diabetes by 20 per cent in five years, and 50 per cent in 10 years. They also promised to double the number of health professionals in 10 years from the then current level of 150 physicians and 1,200 nurses.

The plan included

- $1.8 billion for education, to create school systems, train more Aboriginal teachers and identify children with special needs.
- $1.6 billion for housing, including $400 million to address the need for clean water in many remote communities.
- $1.315 billion for health services.
- $170 million for relationships and accountability
- $200 million for economic development.

All of the targets we've set are achievable

— Phil Fontaine, the National Chief of the Assembly of First Nations, CBC

== Aftermath ==
The Harper government did not proceed with the accord and a number of academic studies recognize that the accord itself is not legally binding. Historic funding agreements were signed by the Harper government, however, the name 'Kelowna Accord' has not been applied to these investments. The budget included $450 million for Aboriginals over two years.

I think the pine beetle infestation in B.C. got more money than urban aboriginals

— Larry Wucherer, the president of the Aboriginal Council of Winnipeg, CBC

Had the Kelowna Accord been passed, the equivalent one year spending would have been $600 million.

One of the offshoots of the national government's refusal to honor from the accord was that it ended in the provinces' hands. According to experts, the multilevel governance in Canada allowed for such engagement even though the federal government is absent. For example, there is the case of Manitoba. The province was the very first to move forward with the agreement, implementing its priorities in partnership with the private sector and the First Nation and Metis peoples. To date, unprecedented progress has been made in the areas of education, training, and employment of Aboriginal Canadians.

Reports, however, show that federal participation is still critical because the present condition leads to diverse provincial strategies and objectives, which led to uneven results. Some provinces like British Columbia, Manitoba, Ontario, and Quebec posted more progress than others. This is further aggravated by the opposition of Conservative politicians on the provincial level.
