= 2004 Canadian federal budget =

Budget for the Government of Canada

2004 Budget of the Canadian Federal Government New Agenda for Achievement
- Presented: 23 March 2004
- Passed: Not Passed
- Country: Canada
- Parliament: 37th
- Party: Liberal
- Finance minister: Ralph Goodale
- Total revenue: C$211.9 billion
- Total expenditures: C$210.5 billion
- Program spending: C$176.4 billion
- Debt payment: C$34.1 billion
- Surplus: C$1.5 billion^{‡}
- Debt: C$494.7 billion
- Website: Budget Plan 2004
- ^{‡}Surplus was used to pay down the federal debt.

The Canadian federal budget of 2004 was a budget for the Government of Canada. It was read in the House of Commons of Canada on March 23, 2004, by Finance Minister Ralph Goodale of the governing Liberal Party. It was prepared by Goodale with significant input from Prime Minister Paul Martin, who had previously served as Minister of Finance in the government of Jean Chrétien.

The budget contained few surprises: most major initiatives had been announced long beforehand. These included $2 billion for health care, money for municipalities, and $1 billion to help livestock farmers harmed by the Mad Cow crisis. Government spending was set to increase at the same rate as Gross domestic product (GDP) over the next few years with any surplus going to pay down the national debt.

== Taxes ==
=== Personal income taxes ===
- The Education Tax Credit is extended to individuals pursuing post-secondary education that is related to their current employment (if not already reimbursed by the employer); (Note: p. 329)
- The budget allows caregivers to claim the Medical Expense Tax Credit on expenses made on the behalf of dependent relatives. (Note: p. 328)
- Enhancement of the Canada Education Savings Grant: matching contribution rate is enhanced for the first $500 of contributions made by low-income families; (Note: p. 369-371)
- Creation of the Canada Learning Bond, effective 1 January 2004 for children born on or after that date. The grant of up to $2,000 (over the child's lifetime) is available for families entitled to the National Child Benefit. (Note: p. 367)

=== Corporate income taxes ===
- Increase in the small business deduction limit: the small business deduction (SBD) limit is increased to $300,000 in 2005 and subsequent years instead of $275,000. The SBD limit was gradually increased in the 2003 Canadian federal budget and at the time was supposed to reach $300,000 in 2006; (Note: p. 329)
- Non-capital losses carry-forward extended to 10 years: the budget extends the loss carry-forward period from 7 to 10 years for non-capital losses. (Note: p. 331)
- Faster depreciation of computer equipment: for computer equipment acquired after 22 March 2004, the CCA rate is increased from 30% to 45%. The separate class election for computer is however terminated for equipment acquired on or after 1 January 2005; (Note: p. 334)
- Extension of the Mineral Exploration Tax Credit: the Mineral Exploration Tax Credit, a temporary tax credit created by the 2000 Canadian federal budget and set to expire on 31 December 2004 per the 2003 Canadian federal budget is extended through 31 December 2005. (Note: p. 336)

== Reactions ==
=== Opposition parties ===
The budget was criticized by the Conservative Party for its lack of tax cuts and its increases in spending. The New Democratic Party criticized the policy of debt reduction, arguing that social spending, especially on health care, would be more beneficial.

== Legislative process ==
Before the budget could be passed, parliament was dissolved for the 2004 election. The budget legislation was appended to the 2005 budget that was passed the next year.

== Notes and references ==
- Budget Plan
