= 2005 Canadian federal budget =

2005 Budget of the Canadian Federal Government Delivering on Commitments
- Presented: 23 February 2005
- Passed: 28 June 2005
- Country: Canada
- Parliament: 38th
- Party: Liberal
- Finance minister: Ralph Goodale
- Total revenue: C$222.2 billion
- Total expenditures: C$209 billion
- Program spending: C$175.2 billion
- Debt payment: C$33.8 billion
- Surplus: C$13.2 billion^{‡}
- Debt: C$481.5 billion
- Website: The Budget Plan 2005
- ^{‡}Surplus was used to pay down federal debt.

The 2005 Canadian federal budget was the budget of the Government of Canada under prime minister Paul Martin's 38th Canadian Parliament for the 2005–06 fiscal year. It was presented on February 23, 2005, by Finance Minister Ralph Goodale. It was the first Canadian federal budget presented by a minority government since the budget of the Joe Clark Progressive Conservative government in 1979, which was defeated by the opposition parties.

Having fewer than half the seats in the House of Commons of Canada meant that the governing Liberal Party of Canada had to win the support of members of other parties for the 2005 budget to pass. Without that support, the budget would have been defeated, and new elections would likely have been called.

In the 2005–06 fiscal year, the government had a large surplus of expected revenues over expenses, making the government able to fund a wide array of new initiatives. The budget bill (C-43) received Royal Assent on June 28, 2005. In order to gain the necessary support of the New Democratic Party (NDP) the budget was amended (Bill C-48) and given assent three weeks later following considerable debate.

== Details of the budget ==
The budget was the eighth balanced budget in a row presented by the Liberal government. It contained minor tax cuts for both businesses and individuals over a five-year period. These cuts, however, were mostly scheduled to begin in the latter years of the five-year period, which meant that the majority of them were unlikely to occur before the next election was held.

=== Taxes ===
==== Personal income taxes ====
- Increase of the basic personal exemption: The personal income tax cut raises the basic personal exemption to $10,000 from its former level of just over $8,000 over the five-year period. This was projected to result in an average tax savings of $16 for each Canadian in 2006, with the final total reaching $192 at the end of the five-year period. The basic personal exemption is indexed to inflation, so it would likely have risen to roughly $9,000 over the five-year period without the changes.
- Increase in RPP and RRSP limits : increase of limits by $1,000 each year between 2006 and 2009 for the RPP, of $1,500 in 2006 and $1,000 each year between 2007 and 2010 for the RRSP. Indexation on average wage growth to start in 2009 for RPPs and 2010 for RRSPs
- Creation of the Adoption Expense Tax Credit : creation of a 16% non-refundable tax credit for adoption expenses for adoption of a child under 18. Eligible fees include notably fees paid to an adoption agency, legal and administrative fees, reasonable travel and living expenses. The maximum tax credit is set at $1,600 for 2005 (Note: 16% of a maximum of $10,000 of eligible expenses.) to be indexed in taxation years after 2005;
- More expenses are made eligible to the Medical Expenses Tax Credit.

==== Corporate income taxes ====
The main change brought by the budget is a gradual reduction in the general corporate tax rate, to be lowered to 19% (from 21%) by 2010 in 3-steps:

- 20.5% starting on 1 January 2008;
- 20% on 1 January 2009;
- 19% on 1 January 2010.

Selected investment incentives were also enhanced:

- Faster depreciation for highly-efficient or renewable energy generation equipment: selected clean energy generation equipment were to be eligible to a special 50% CCA rate (instead of 30%) if the equipment were purchased before 2012.
- Incentives for scientific research and experimental development (SR&ED) were made eligible for expenses incurred in Canada's Exclusive Economic Zone.
- Foreign investment limits were scrapped for businesses headquartered in Canada.

=== Expenditures ===
The budget also contained $12.7 billion for the Department of National Defence over the following five years. However, not all of this money was new funding and, as with most of the budget, it was back-loaded. The total new funding for 2006 was to be $500 million.

Start-up money was provided for Canada's efforts to comply with the Kyoto Accord and for a national child care program. Additional funding was provided for cities, health care, and foreign aid. Some cuts were made. The Air Travel Complaints Commissioner was abolished, and foreign aid to Thailand, Malaysia, and all countries now in the European Union was ended. In total, $11 billion in savings are expected.

== Reactions ==
=== Opposition parties ===
==== Initial response by opposition parties ====
The Conservative Party, the largest opposition party, surprised many by announcing that it would support the budget immediately after it was read in the House of Commons. Party leader Stephen Harper described it as "better than expected", and described its focus on tax cuts and defence spending as being in line with Conservative policy. It is highly unusual for the official opposition to vote in favour of the government's budget. However, Harper later changed his position on the budget, and his party joined with the NDP and the Bloc Québécois in the largest abstention in Canadian history.

The Bloc Québécois and party leader Gilles Duceppe, who were demanding an overhaul to employment insurance and the elimination of the fiscal imbalance, voted against the budget.

The New Democratic Party voted against the budget on first reading. Leader Jack Layton agreed with Harper that it was a "conservative budget" and was especially critical of the corporate tax cuts and the limited new funding for social programs.

==== Changes following the Liberal-NDP deal ====
Prior to the second reading the political situation changed dramatically due to Jean Brault's explosive testimony at the Gomery Inquiry. Stephen Harper announced that the Liberals had lost the moral authority to govern and vowed to bring down the government. Thus when the budget came to its second reading the Conservatives rallied against it. In order to ensure the continued confidence of the House, the Liberals struck a deal with the NDP to amend the budget. This amendment called for a reduction of the foreseen corporate tax cuts and $4.6 billion in additional spending on social programs.

Despite the NDP support, the government remained in a precarious position, requiring the support of all three independent Members of Parliament (MPs). On May 17, Conservative MP Belinda Stronach crossed the floor to the Liberals, giving them a crucial extra vote. Soon after, Liberal polling numbers ended their slide and began to recover. Two Conservative MPs from Newfoundland and Labrador, Loyola Hearn and Norman Doyle, were also pressured by provincial premier Danny Williams to vote in favour of the budget, as it included the provisions of the government's recent Atlantic Accords. The Conservatives eventually announced that they would vote in favour of the main budget bill, containing the Atlantic Accord, but would vote against the second bill containing the NDP amendments.

=== Business community and labour unions ===
The budget was criticized by many labour unions and interest groups:

- The University student federation of Quebec criticized the lack of funding for post-secondary education and the increase in the defence budget;
- Quebec's Hospitals Association and the Federation of Medical Specialists of Québec criticized the budget on the grounds that it did not address fiscal imbalance and increase health transfers despite the promises made by the federal government in the September 2004 Health Accord.

The budget was not received warmly by the business community:

- The Quebec Council of Employers did not find that the budget addressed its demands and that the tax cuts were not large enough to address the increase in value of the Canadian dollar;
- The Quebec's Chamber of Commerce Federation criticized the gradual approach taken by the budget towards tax cuts although the Montreal Chamber of Commerce approved the transfer of a fraction of the Excise Tax on Gasoline to municipalities;
- The Montreal Economic Institute rejected the budget proposed tax cuts as immaterial and criticized that they would not materialize before 2008.

=== Provinces ===
The péquiste Bernard Landry, leader of the Official Opposition in Quebec, strongly criticized the budget, even saying that the Premier of Quebec Jean Charest had been cheated by the budget. He notably criticized Jean Charest for not standing up to Ottawa on fiscal imbalance and the federal government for its intrusion in provincial competencies, notably in childcare. François Legault, PQ's finance critic, also criticized the increase in defence spending and the tax cuts to wealthy individuals.

== Legislative history ==
After Stronach's move, the government could count on the same number of votes as the opposition: the Liberals, the NDP and independent MP Carolyn Parrish supported the budget, while the Conservatives and the Bloc opposed it. The fate of the government thus hung on the decisions of the other two independent MPs: David Kilgour and Chuck Cadman. The government needed the support of at least one of the two to continue to enjoy the confidence of the House. Cadman was suffering from melanoma, and before the day of the vote it was not clear whether or not he would be able to attend.

On May 19, a vote was held for second reading of Bill C-43 (the main budget), and Bill C-48 (the amendments). The main budget bill passed on a vote of 250 to 54, with only the Bloc Québécois voting against. The second bill received a vote of 152 Yea and 152 Nay. The Conservatives and Bloc Québécois voted against second reading, while the Liberals and NDP voted in favour. Conservative MP Darrel Stinson was unable to attend the vote due to cancer surgery, so Liberal MP Peter Adams agreed to sit out as a courtesy. Independent MP Kilgour voted against the budget, while Parrish and Cadman voted in favour. In the event of a tied vote, the Speaker casts the tie-breaking vote. According to parliamentary convention, the Speaker votes, whenever possible, for the continuation of debate. Thus, the Speaker voted in favour of second reading, "to allow the House time for further debate so that it can make its own decision at some future time."

The Speaker's vote allowed Martin to maintain the confidence of the House by 153–152. It was the first time in Canadian history that the Speaker had cast a vote on a confidence motion concerning the Prime Minister.

Allegations were later made in a book by Vancouver journalist Tom Zytaruk in early 2008 that the Conservative Party attempted to get Cadman to support the Conservative's positions by offering him a $1 million life insurance policy. Conservative leader and Prime Minister at the time of the allegations Stephen Harper denied that the party bribed Cadman. As of February 2008, the allegations have not been proven.

After this vote, the Conservatives admitted their defeat and backed away from their pledge to bring down the government. On June 14, a series of 16 votes were held pertaining to the budget: one for concurring in the committee report for Bill C-43 and dozens of amendments and other motions. As many as 15 were considered confidence votes and could have triggered an election if one was lost. Several opposition members were absent. The government won each vote, virtually guaranteeing that no election would be held in the summer of 2005.

Two days later, Bill C-43 was finally passed and moved to the Senate. Meanwhile, the NDP amendments came out of committee and debate was launched.

3rd reading vote on:
Party	C-43: Budget Implementation Act, 2005				C-48: An Act to authorize the Minister of Finance to make certain payments			
Party	Yea	Nay	Abstention	Absent	Yea	Nay	Abstention	Absent
Liberals	130	0	0	3	132	0	0	1
Conservatives	91	0	0	7	0	91	0	7
Bloc Québécois	0	53	0	1	0	54	0	0
New Democratic	19	0	0	0	19	0	0	0
Independents	2	1	0	1	1	2	0	1
Total	✓ 242	54	0	12	✓ 152	147	0	9

On June 23, the House voted to extend the session into the summer to deal with C-48 and with the same-sex marriage bill (Bill C-38). Then, in a late-night session, after several Conservative members had already left the house, the Liberals, NDP, and Bloc voted to invoke closure on the debate. The Liberals and NDP then voted in favour of passing Bill C-48, defeating the Conservatives and Bloc by a margin of 5 votes. The outcome upset Conservative MPs and left the same-sex marriage bill as the only major business to be dealt with during the extended session in the House. It, too, was passed on June 28, allowing the House to call a recess.

The bills moved to the Senate. Bill C-43 was still in committee hearing stage on the morning of June 28, but Liberal senators rushed the bill through the legislative process all day, allowing it to receive Royal Assent before the day was over.

== See also ==
- Canadian federal spending, 2004

== Notes and references ==
=== References ===
==== Budget documents ====
- Budget Plan 2005 (PDF). Ottawa. February 23, 2005.

==== Enacted legislations ====
- Budget Implementation Act, 2005, S.C. 2005, c. 30
- An Act to authorize the Minister of Finance to make certain payments, S.C. 2005, c. 36

=== External links ===
- Department of Finance – Budget 2005 speech text
- Transcript of Parliamentary proceedings surrounding second reading of Bills C-43 and C-48
- CBC News Indepth – 2005 Budget
