= Anything But Conservative =

Canadian political campaign

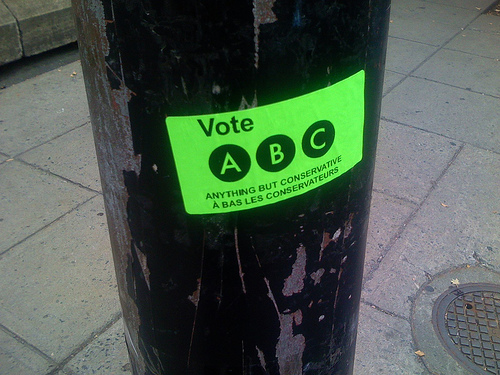
A sticker on a telephone pole advertising the ABC Campaign

Anything But Conservative (French: À bas les conservateurs or N'importe quoi d'autre que conservateur) was a strategic voting campaign trial by opponents of the Conservative Party of Canada also known by the names ABC Campaign or Vote ABC.

== Previous strategic voting campaign ==
=== Vote Anything but Liberal ===
During the 2001 Alberta provincial elections, Conservative Party leader Stephen Harper led the National Citizens Coalition in a "Vote Anything but Liberal" campaign.

== 2008 federal elections ==
The ABC campaign originated in the 2008 Canadian Federal Election with the Progressive Conservative Party of Newfoundland and Labrador, encouraging the province's voters to support any party other than the federal Conservative Party. The campaign was established by Newfoundland and Labrador Premier Danny Williams, and was targeted particularly within that province in response to what Williams called a "broken promise" by Conservative prime minister Stephen Harper regarding equalization payments to the province. The campaign achieved its primary goal: all federal Conservative candidates lost their seats in Newfoundland and Labrador.

The project was officially overseen by an organization known simply as "ABC Campaign", which was affiliated with the provincial Progressive Conservative Party that Williams led, and which was registered with Elections Canada as a "third party" for the purposes of election expenditures. The provincial government itself also funded advertisements supporting the campaign's goals. It has been estimated that the campaigners spent over $81,000 on the ABC campaign.

=== Background ===
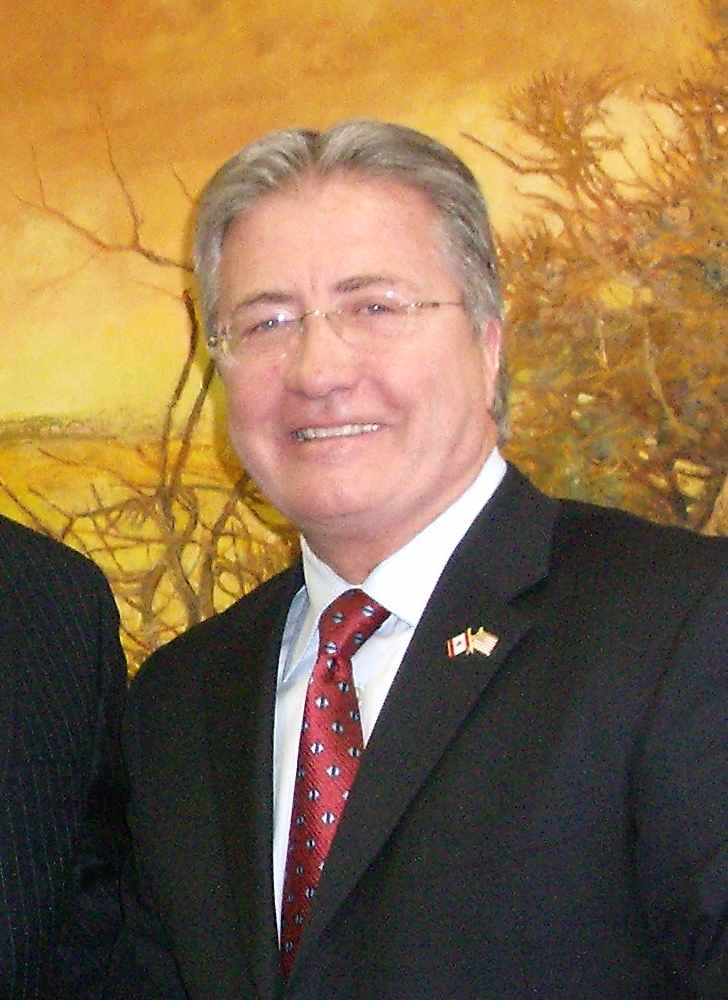
Danny Williams, former Premier of Newfoundland and Labrador, initiated the ABC campaign in 2007

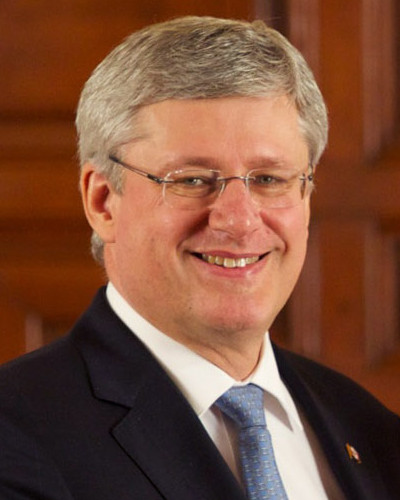
Stephen Harper, former Prime Minister of Canada

On December 23, 2004 the Progressive Conservative Premier of Newfoundland and Labrador Danny William ordered all Canadian flags removed from provincial buildings during a dispute with then Prime Minister Paul Martin, an action that was widely covered by Canadian media. Williams demanded that the province to keep all of its offshore oil and gas revenues, along with equalization payments, an exception to the fiscal formula which rescinded equalization transfer payments to a province that had increased natural resources revenues. Martin largely accepted Williams' demands in late January 2005, around the time of an expected by-election (incumbent Liberal MP Lawrence D. O'Brien was terminally ill) that would hold the balance of power for the Liberal minority government. After O'Brien's death, Todd Russell retained the seat for the Liberals in the resulting by-election held on May 24, 2005.

Critics, including Ontario Premier Dalton McGuinty, argued that the Atlantic Accord unfairly benefited Newfoundland and Labrador at the expense of other provinces. It was particularly criticized by Ontario Premier Dalton McGuinty. Ontario was traditionally one of the Confederation's "have" provinces, while Newfoundland was a "have-not". McGuinty argued that his province—already sending more money to the federal government than it gets back in equalization payments—would get further short-changed as the accord permitted Newfoundland to keep its oil revenues rather than sharing them with the other provinces. While the accord helped the federal Liberal government remain in power, it was viewed as a short-term political advantage that would damage the Liberal Party's long-term electoral viability, particularly in Ontario.

On January 4, 2006, during the 2006 Federal Election campaign, the then-opposition Conservative Party leader Stephen Harper sent a letter to the conservative Premier of Newfoundland and Labrador, Danny Williams, with the following statement regarding the federal equalization formula:

A Conservative government would also support changes to the equalization program to ensure provinces and territories have the opportunity to develop economies and sustain important core social services. We will remove non-renewable natural resource revenue from the equalization formula to encourage the development of economic growth in the non-renewable resource sectors across Canada. The Conservative government will ensure that no province is adversely affected from changes to the equalization formula.

— Stephen Harper, letter to Danny Williams, January 4, 2006

Following the election and after becoming prime minister, Harper began to distance himself from the statement that October. The subsequent 2007 federal budget ostensibly met this promise by introducing the option of a new equalization formula allowing each province to exclude its natural resources—but it also imposed a cap on the amount of equalization each province could receive, effectively negating the Atlantic Accord. The budget also gave each province the option of retaining the original equalization formula. This budget was praised by Ontario Premier McGuinty, a critic of the Atlantic Accord. Williams said that, based on the restrictions imposed on the new formula, the province had been "shafted", and that "based on the fact that they've broken their promise and broken their commitment, citizens should not vote Conservative in the next federal election."

==== Affiliations ====
The federal Conservative Party does not have any formal affiliation with the various provincial Progressive Conservative parties (although there were ties with its predecessor, the federal Progressive Conservative). The federal and Newfoundland Conservatives generally got along well until the equalization issue.

The ABC campaign did not specifically endorse any alternative federal party, and Progressive Conservative politicians campaigned on behalf of candidates for both the federal Liberal and New Democratic parties. The campaign led to the federal Conservatives shutting out of Newfoundland and Labrador in the 2008 election; nationally, however, the campaign had little effect in that election, as that party was elected to another minority government. The federal conservative government reached an agreement to help fund hydroelectric power in Newfoundland, which tried to ensure the re-election of the Conservative Party on May 2, 2011.

=== The campaign ===
The campaign began unofficially in May 2007; it was when Williams told the Economic Club of Toronto that the decision would cost the province billions of dollars, adding: "I am encouraging Newfoundlanders and Labradorians, and Canadians, in the next federal election to simply vote ABC—easy to remember. Vote ABC—anything but Conservative." Harper and Newfoundland opposition leader Gerry Reid criticized Williams' "overreaction", saying "this kind of confrontation is damaging the business investment climate of Newfoundland and Labrador". Nonetheless, in the provincial election held that year, the Conservatives won 44 of 48 seats in the legislature.

At the start of the 2008 election, a campaign website was launched, while members of the provincial PC caucus campaigned on behalf of federal Liberal and NDP candidates. All caucus members were expected to participate in the ABC campaign, with the exception of the backbencher (and one-time health minister) Elizabeth Marshall, who said she could not bring herself to support a Liberal or NDP candidate. No provincial PC politician openly supported the federal Conservatives during the 2008 campaign. On a campaign visit to the province, Harper responded that "no one can tell a Newfoundlander and Labradorian how to vote" and that the voters' choice should be "about your own best interests."

The "ABC" slogan became commonly used throughout the country during the campaign. A number of unaffiliated groups opposing the Conservatives' policies, including an environmental group calling itself "Project ABC", also used the slogan or similar sayings during the 2008 campaign. The anti-Conservative campaign promoted strategic voting to minimize the number of seats won by the Conservatives. There were also online services organizing "vote swapping" to maximize the distribution of non-Conservative votes.

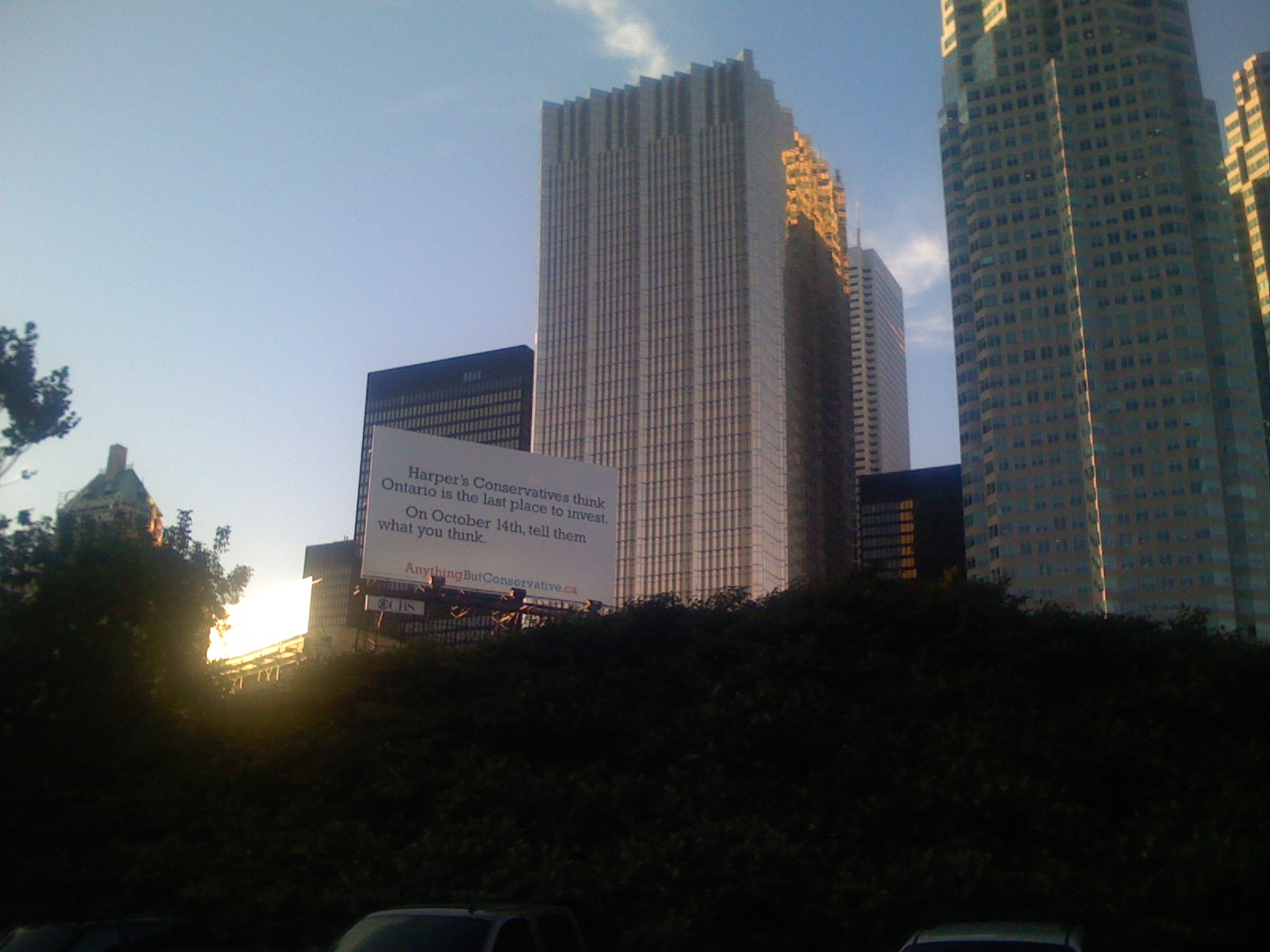
A billboard advertising the ABC campaign on the Gardiner Expressway in Toronto

Leo Power, a veteran of federal politics and the Conservative Party of Canada's campaign co-chair for Newfoundland and Labrador, said raising money and recruiting volunteers has proved difficult, and blames Williams's ABC campaign, saying it has cut deep into the federal election machine that was struggling to compete. Power has also said his party's best hope of winning a seat in the province was in the riding of Avalon with incumbent candidate Fabian Manning.

While there was "anyone but Harper" activity stemming from a variety of sources across the country, the ABC campaign's national presence was limited to media interviews and a billboard on the Gardiner Expressway in Toronto; Williams did not travel across Canada as he had previously suggested. Of the province's seven seats in the House of Commons, the Liberals won six while the NDP won one, with the Conservatives being shut out. The federal Conservatives were elected to a second consecutive minority government, with more seats than in the previous parliament, including gains in Ontario (whose politicians had been most critical of the Atlantic Accord). The loss of all Newfoundland and Labrador seats prevented the Conservatives from winning a majority government.

=== Legacy ===
After the ABC Campaign, all federal Conservative candidates lost their seats in Newfoundland and Labrador. In the 2011 federal election, the Conservatives gained a single seat in Newfoundland and Labrador. The provincial Progressive Conservatives, led by Williams, won 44 out of 48 seats in the provincial elections. Williams remained the Premier of Newfoundland and Labrador until stepping down from politics in 2010.

Post-campaign, Williams argued that the federal Conservative government's changes to equalization payments would cost Newfoundland $1.6 billion over three years, as it removes the ability of the province to choose whether to sign on to previously announced equalization policies. However, the budget passed in February 2009, with the support of the official opposition Liberals led by Michael Ignatieff. Williams unsuccessfully lobbied the Liberals to remove the changes to equalization, but Ignatieff refused, saying, "I'm not in the business of carrying Premier Williams' water. He has to understand that I have to represent Canadians from coast to coast and from all provinces".

St. John's mayor Dennis O'Keefe suggested that the Liberal MPs from Newfoundland would be committing "political suicide" if they followed the party line on the budget. Ignatieff permitted the six Newfoundland Liberal MPs to break with party discipline and vote against the budget. Ignatieff resigned after losing the 2011 federal elections. One other provincial premier, Prince Edward Island's Robert Ghiz, supported Williams' position. Williams was disappointed by the lack of support from other provinces, saying, "This is a great country and I want to be part of it, but the country disappoints me when we don't rally to protect each other."

== 2015 federal elections ==
During the 2015 federal elections, it is claimed by the ABC Campaign that thousands of grassroots volunteers knocked on doors to ask Canadians to vote strategically in key ridings. While Unifor, Canada's second-largest union, encouraged members to vote strategically against the Conservatives, the Canadian Union of Public Employees (CUPE), the country's largest union, endorsed the NDP directly rather than advocating for broader strategic voting.

The Liberals won a majority of 184, and the Conservatives lost 60 seats. According to Éric Grenier, "with the Conservatives performing only slightly below expectations in the seat count, these surprise wins came largely at the expense of the NDP in some of their most secure ridings, as the Liberals' momentum swept up strategic voters to carry them over the majority threshold." Post-election polls show that roughly one-third of the votes for the Liberal Party candidates were cast strategically to prevent another Conservative government. Strategic voting negatively affected the NDP in Quebec and Ontario but helped them win seats in British Columbia and Alberta. 44 percent of NDP voters in British Columbia and 40 percent in Alberta said that they were voting strategically for NDP.
