= Canada Education Savings Act =

Canadian education support law

Parliament of Canada
- Long title: An Act to provide financial assistance for post-secondary education savings
- Citation: S.C. 2004, c. 26
- Considered by: House of Commons of Canada
- Enacted by: Parliament of Canada
- Considered by: Senate of Canada
- Assented to: 15 December 2004

Legislative history

First chamber: Parliament of Canada
- Bill citation: Bill C-5
- First reading: 8 October 2004
- Second reading: 14 October 2004
- Third reading: 7 December 2004

Second chamber: Senate of Canada
- First reading: December 7, 2004
- Second reading: December 9, 2004
- Third reading: December 13, 2004
- Status: Current legislation

The Canada Education Savings Act (French: Loi canadienne sur l’épargne-études, CESA) is an Act of the Parliament of Canada. It is intended to provide financial assistance for post-secondary education savings. The first version of the law was assented to on 15 December 2004. Most sections of the act entered into force on 1 July 2005.

== Content ==
The law organizes the incentives programs provided by the Government of Canada for post-secondary education savings. As of 2020 these programs include:

- The Canada Education Savings Grant (CESG) a matching contribution made by the government towards contributions made to a Registered Education Savings Plan;
- The Canada Learning Bond (CLB) an additional grant available to low-income families.

== Legislative history ==
The Canada Education Savings Act was adopted on third reading on 7 December 2004 by a large majority of 273 votes for (from both Liberal, Conservative and Bloc MPs) versus 19 against (the entire NDP caucus).

Prior to the passage of the Canada Education Savings Act, dispositions administrating the CESG program were contained in the Department of Human Resources Development Act. CESG remained under the purview of Human Resources Development Canada pursuant to an Order in Council.
