= Canadian federal spending, 2004 =

Canadian federal spending, 2004, comprises the revenues and expenditures of the Government of Canada in the 2004-2005 fiscal year (April 1, 2004 to March 31, 2005). All figures below are in Canadian dollars, and are reported as prepared by the Receiver General for Canada, in the annual Public Accounts of Canada. The ±% column below is relative to the last Canadian federal fiscal year of 03–04, as noted in Canadian federal spending, 2003.

== Revenues ==
Revenues of the Government of Canada, 2004-2005 Fiscal Year
Revenue Name	Amount	±%
TAX REVENUES--		
Income tax--		
Personal	$98,520,957,000	
Corporate	$29,955,402,000	
Other income tax revenues	$3,560,166,000	
Other taxes and duties--		
Goods and services tax	$29,758,186,000	
Energy taxes--		
Excise tax--Gasoline	$4,013,957,000	
Excise tax—Aviation gasoline and diesel fuel	$1,040,363,000	
Customs import duties	$3,091,209,000	
Other excise taxes and duties--		
Excise duties	$4,335,433,000	
Air travellers security charges	$383,201,000	
Miscellaneous excise taxes and duties	$235,034,000	
TOTAL TAX REVENUES	$174,893,908,000	
EMPLOYMENT INSURANCE PREMIUMS	$17,306,782,000	
OTHER REVENUES--		
Crown corporation revenues--	$1,505,951,000	
Enterprise Crown corporations and other government business enterprises--		
Share of annual profit	$4,854,814,000	
Interest and other	$466,570,000	
Other program revenues--		
Return on investments	$491,130,000	
Sales of goods and services	$5,463,268,000	
Miscellaneous revenues	$5,500,515,000	
Foreign exchange revenues--		
Exchange Fund Account	$1,827,486,000	
International Monetary Fund	-$653,370,000	
Other	$640,000	
TOTAL OTHER REVENUES	$19,457,004,000	
TOTAL REVENUES	$211,657,694,000	

== Expenses ==
Expenses of the Government of Canada, 2004-2005 Fiscal Year
Expense Name	Amount	±%
TRANSFER PAYMENTS--		
Old age security benefits, guaranteed income supplement and spouse's allowance--	$27,870,984,000	
Other levels of government--		
Canada health and social transfer	$28,031,155,000	
Fiscal arrangements	$12,863,527,000	
Alternative payments for standing programs--	-$2,746,317,000	
Other	$3,806,923,000	
Employment insurance benefits--	$14,747,612,000	
Canada child tax benefits	$8,687,760,000	
Other transfer payments	$25,000,810,000	
TOTAL TRANSFER PAYMENTS	$118,262,454,000	
OTHER PROGRAM EXPENSES--	$4,335,433,000	
Crown Corporation Expenses	$8,907,419,000	
Agriculture and Agri-Food	$1,341,915,000	
Canada Customs and Revenue Agency	$3,748,605,000	
Environment	$1,295,505,000	
Fisheries and Oceans	$1,353,269,000	
Foreign Affairs and International Trade (Foreign Affairs)	$1,565,736,000	
Health	$1,954,206,000	
Human Resources and Skills Development	$2,500,359,000	
Industry	$2,093,223,000	
Justice	$1,010,537,000	
National Defence	$14,317,557,000	
Public Works and Government Services	$2,326,043,000	
Solicitor General (Public Safety and Emergency Preparedness)	$6,057,399,000	
Treasury Board	$1,716,863,000	
Other ministries	$7,458,337,000	
TOTAL OTHER PROGRAM EXPENSES	$57,646,973,000	
TOTAL PROGRAM EXPENSES	$175,909,427,000	
PUBLIC DEBT CHARGES	$34,117,928,000	
TOTAL EXPENSES	$210,027,355,000	

== See also ==
- Canadian federal budget, 2004
- Canadian federal budget, 2005
- Ontario provincial spending, 2004
