= CESG =

CESG may refer to:

- Communications-Electronics Security Group, a group within the UK Government Communications Headquarters (GCHQ)
- Canada Education Savings Grant, a Government of Canada program
