= 2007 Canadian federal budget =

2007 Budget of the Canadian Federal Government
C-52
- Presented: 19 March 2007
- Passed: 22 June 2007
- Country: Canada
- Parliament: 39th
- Party: Conservative
- Finance minister: Jim Flaherty
- Total revenue: C$242.4 billion
- Total expenditures: C$232.8 billion
- Program spending: C$199.5 billion
- Tax cuts: C$5.7 billion
- Debt payment: C$33.3 billion
- Surplus: C$9.6 billion
- Debt: C$457.6 billion
- Website: http://www.budget.gc.ca/2007/pdf/bp2007e.pdf Aspire to a Stronger, Safer, Better Canada

The Canadian federal budget for the 2007–08 fiscal year was presented to the House of Commons of Canada by Finance Minister Jim Flaherty. Flaherty presented the 2007 budget on March 19, 2007. No income tax or GST cuts were announced but there were tax credits (of up to $310 per child) for some families with children under 18. The federal budget included $14 billion in new spending and $5.7 billion in tax cuts. This was the second budget of the 39th Canadian Parliament.

Since the government held a minority, the budget needed support of at least one opposition party. On March 29, 2007, Bill C-52, the enabling legislation to implement the budget, received First Reading in the House of Commons with the support of the Bloc Québécois. The New Democratic Party and Liberal Party voted against it. The budget passed 174 to 109 in the House of Commons in first reading. It would later pass the second and third readings in June.

Many politicians believe that the changes to equalization disregard the Atlantic Accord. There was speculation that some Atlantic government members would vote against the Budget, but only Bill Casey did, and was subsequently removed from Caucus.

On June 22, 2007, the Senate passed the budget with a vote of 45–21, with only liberal senators from Atlantic Canada and Saskatchewan voting against it. Conservative senator Anne Cools voted against it too, which in turn led to her removal from the Conservative caucus. The bill was given royal assent by the Governor-General, Michaëlle Jean, about two hours after the vote.

== Areas of direction ==
Some of the key items in the budget were:

- $39 billion in transfers to provinces for public services and infrastructure
- $2000/child tax credit
- $9.2 billion in debt reduction
- $550 million/year to combat the welfare trap
- Subsidies up to $2000 on low-emissions automobiles and excise tax on fuel-inefficient vehicles increased to $4000.
- $1.5 billion in transfers to provinces for projects that combat climate change and air pollution
- $400 million to implement national electronic health records
- $612 million to reduce hospital wait times
- $300 million for HPV vaccines
- $60 million increase in Canadian Forces wages
- $600 million for farmer savings plans
- $400 million to offset agriculture production costs
- Increase in tobacco tax to offset GST reduction

These expenditures and cuts have led to some belief that this is pre-election budget, aimed at enticing voters.

=== Enhancements to registered savings plans ===
- Increase age limit for RRSPs
- $140 million to establish a Registered Disability Savings Plan
- Removal of the Registered education savings plan annual contribution limit
- Enhancement in the Canada Education Savings Grant

== Reception ==
The Liberals and the New Democrats announced shortly following the presentation of the budget that they would not support in its current form.

Nova Scotian politicians have criticized the new equalization plan, as it cuts back payments on the assumption that various offshore programs will result in increased revenues. Nova Scotia premier Rodney MacDonald has stated that this situation is caused by the few Nova Scotian seats in the Federal Cabinet. This is expected to be a cut of approximately 5 million dollars. Premier MacDonald later urged all his province's MPs to vote against the budget after a letter Flaherty that was published in a Nova Scotia newspaper. 9 of the 11 MPs voted against it in the third reading. After the 2007 passed, the government started to work on a comprise with Nova Scotia to settle the dispute.

Newfoundland and Labrador premier Danny Williams criticized the budget as being a "betrayal" and a violation of the terms of the 2005 Atlantic Accord. Bill Casey, Conservative Member of Parliament for Cumberland—Colchester—Musquodoboit Valley, voted against the budget, because of the unfair equalization formula for Nova Scotia and Newfoundland and Labrador, and the effective cancellation of the Atlantic Accord. He has since been removed from the Conservative caucus.

Quebec Premier Jean Charest had applauded the budget, as his province would receive over $2 billion in additional equalization payment. Parti Québécois leader Andre Boisclair spoke in opposition to the budget, saying that the new money for Quebec was part of an effort to buy votes for the federalist Liberal Party of Quebec before the March 26, 2007 provincial election.

Saskatchewan Premier Lorne Calvert argued that his province will receive no new money and alleged that the Conservatives were favouring Ontario and Quebec at the expense of other provinces, which MP Maurice Vellacott has disputed. Other premiers including New Brunswick's Shawn Graham, British Columbia's Gordon Campbell had some reservations. However, Ontario Premier Dalton McGuinty said that the budget represented "real progress" for his province.

The Mayor of Toronto, David Miller, also criticized the budget for its alleged lack of funding for cities.

Many Ontario-based and Western-Canadian columnists have supported Flaherty's budget, citing figures that indicate that the per capital income in Newfoundland and Nova Scotia has improved significantly, at the expense of Ontario, and that allowing the Maritime provinces to keep both equalization payments and resource revenues would hurt Ontario even more.

House of Commons vote on the Budget Implementation Act, 2007
Party	Yea	Nay	Abstention	Absent
Conservatives	113	0	5	6
Liberals	0	76	0	24
Bloc Québécois	43	0	5	1
New Democratic	0	26	0	3
Independents	2	1	0	1
Total	158	103	10	35

== October 2007 economic statement ==
On October 30, 2007, the Conservatives tabled an economic statement (similar to a mini-budget) and announced various tax cuts and exemptions. Overall, the government proposed a total of $60 billion in tax cuts over five years, including $14 billion in corporate tax cuts by 2012 (or a drop of 33%), a 1% drop of the GST to 5%, an increase of the basic personal tax exemption to $10,100 per year by 2009. The stated goal of the corporate tax cuts was to set Canadian corporate tax rates as the lowest in the G7, although this would require the provinces do matching tax cuts. The lowest personal tax rate will be reduced from 15.5% to 15%, effective January 1, 2007 back to the same level as when the Conservatives were elected in 2006. Economists said that with the large surpluses the federal government accumulated as well as high tax levels, there was another room for significant tax cuts.

The opposition parties criticized the mini-budget as the NDP leader Jack Layton mentioned that the budget did little for impoverished Canadians, and that big corporations such as oil companies and major banks will receive hefty tax breaks. The Liberals were critical of the GST cut as being not an efficient tax-relief but did praise the corporate tax cuts. The mini-budget, a confidence motion did pass 127–76 but without support of any opposition party as the Liberals abstained from voting as they did with the Fall 2007 Throne Speech.

During the Throne Speech in October 2007, Harper also addressed issues surrounding the economy because of difficulties in the manufacturing and forest sectors due to the loss of numerous jobs at several companies including the three major automakers in the United States and several small to large forest companies over the past few years. On January 10, 2008, the government announced a $1 billion relief fund for single-industry communities that were hit hard by recent closures particularly in the forest and manufacturing industries but also the fishing sector.

== See also ==
- Domestic policy of the Harper government
