= Canada small business tax rate =

Tax rate in Canada

In Canada’s federal tax system, the small business tax rate is the tax rate paid by a small business. As of 2019, the small business tax rate is 9%. The general corporate tax rate is 28%. Additionally, each province or territory operates its own corporate tax system, with varying treatment for small businesses.

== Provincial taxation ==
Corporate taxes in Newfoundland and Labrador corporate tax rates span from 3 per cent at the lowest rate to 15 per cent at highest rate; in Nova Scotia from 3% to 16%, in New Brunswick from 2.5% to 14%, in Prince Edward Island from 3% to 16%, in Ontario from 3.2% to 11.5%, in Manitoba 12%, in Saskatchewan from 2% to 12%, in British Columbia from 2% to 12%, in Nunavut from 3% to 12%, in the Northwest Territories from 4% to 11.5%, in Alberta 8%, in Quebec 4%, and in Yukon from 2% to 12%. In most cases, the provinces and territories have two rates of income tax—the lower rate and the higher rate. Businesses that are eligible for the federal small business deduction (SBD) are also eligible for a lower corporate tax rate at the provincial and territorial levels.

According to a June 1, 2020 report, there are two or occasionally three levels of corporate taxes in the provinces and territories—the first includes small businesses, with income generally up to $500,000, that are eligible for the "small-business deduction" (SBD); the second (where it exists) includes businesses engaged in manufacturing and processing (M&P) with income greater than $500,000 that are not eligible for federal SBD (%); and the third includes general income businesses, with non-M&P income, that are not eligible for SBD (%). Québec has three levels—the rate for the first level is c. 4% to 5%, for the second level it is 11.50%, and for the third level it is 11.50%.

== Definitions ==
A small business in Canada is defined as a Canadian-based corporation (i.e. one incorporated under the federal Canada Business Corporations Act or similar provincial legislation) with fewer than 100 employees and under CA$500,000 in annual income.

Small businesses are allowed to claim a "small business deduction" under the Income Tax Act; the deduction enumerated in that Act is deducted from the 28% general tax rate, and means the net small business tax rate is as follows:

=== Tax rate by year ===
Year	Tax Rate (%)
2006	12
2007	12
2008	11
2009	11
2010	11
2011	11
2012	11
2013	11
2014	11
2015	11
2016	10.5
2017	10.5
2018	10
2019	9

== Passive income investment ==
Passive income investment is income from "fixed income investments", "dividend-paying stocks", interest, capital gain, rent, royalties and other earnings that are not directly related to the corporation's active main business income. This passive income can be significant for large corporations.

New rules introduced in 2018, are based on the CCPCs "Adjusted Aggregate Investment Income" (AAII)—passive investment income—and "tie SBD eligibility to investment income earned by associated corporations." Under these new rules, taxes cannot be "avoided by using a holding company."
