= Danny Williams (Canadian politician) =

Canadian politician

The Honourable Danny Williams ECNL KC
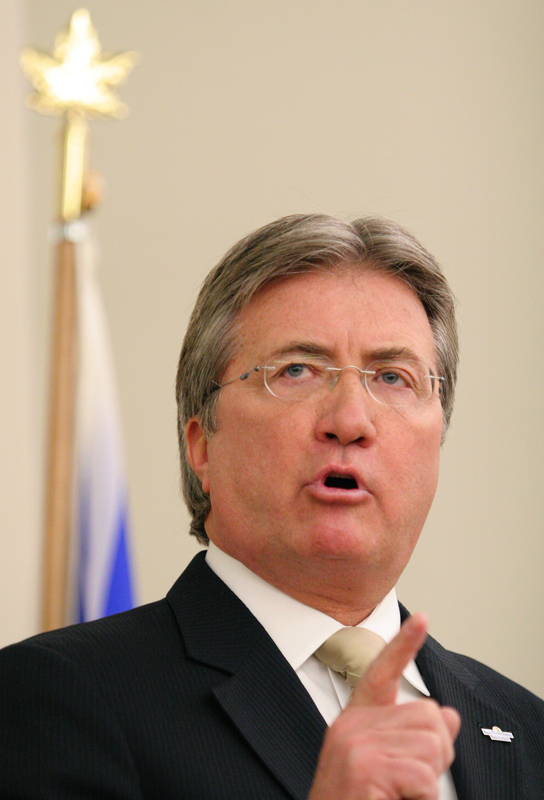
- Williams in 2007

9th Premier of Newfoundland and Labrador
- In office November 6, 2003 – December 3, 2010
- Monarch: Elizabeth II
- Lieutenant Governor: Edward Moxon Roberts; John Crosbie
- Deputy: Tom Rideout; Kathy Dunderdale
- Preceded by: Roger Grimes
- Succeeded by: Kathy Dunderdale

Leader of the Opposition in Newfoundland and Labrador
- In office August 2, 2001 – November 6, 2003
- Preceded by: Ed Byrne
- Succeeded by: Roger Grimes

Leader of the Progressive Conservative Party of Newfoundland and Labrador
- In office April 7, 2001 – December 3, 2010
- Preceded by: Ed Byrne
- Succeeded by: Kathy Dunderdale

Member of the Newfoundland and Labrador House of Assembly for Humber West
- In office August 2, 2001 – December 3, 2010
- Preceded by: Paul Dicks
- Succeeded by: Vaughn Granter (2011)

Personal details
- Born: August 4, 1949 (age 77) St. John's, Newfoundland, Canada
- Party: Progressive Conservative
- Spouse: Elizabeth Williams

Daniel E. Williams ECNL KC (born August 4, 1949) is a Canadian politician, businessman, and lawyer who served as the ninth premier of Newfoundland and Labrador between November 6, 2003, and December 3, 2010.

Williams was born and raised in St. John's, Newfoundland and Labrador. Before entering politics Williams was a highly successful lawyer and businessman. After becoming Leader of the Progressive Conservative Party of Newfoundland and Labrador in 2001, he was elected to the House of Assembly in a by-election for the district of Humber West in Corner Brook.

Williams's premiership was controversial outside of Newfoundland and Labrador. Events such as ordering all Canadian flags to be removed from provincial government buildings, and launching the Anything But Conservative campaign in the 2008 federal election, garnered national attention. While Williams remains a controversial politician outside Newfoundland and Labrador, he was continuously ranked as one of the most popular premiers, with approval ratings in the province consistently in the high seventies and eighties.

== Early life and education ==
Daniel E. Williams was born in St. John's, Newfoundland, Canada, the eldest of four children to Thomas Williams and Teresita (Galway). He received his early education from Saint Bonaventure's College and then Gonzaga High School. The Williams family have been Progressive Conservatives since the province's confederation with Canada; Williams handed out brochures and put up signs in support of John Diefenbaker's campaign to be prime minister.

Williams went on to study at Memorial University of Newfoundland, where he received a degree in political science and economics. In 1969, he was awarded the Rhodes Scholarship and went to Keble College, Oxford, United Kingdom to read Arts in Law. Whilst at Oxford, he played hockey for the Oxford University Ice Hockey Club. He then attended Dalhousie University, Halifax where he earned a Bachelor of Laws degree.

== Professional and business career ==
(All currency is in Canadian dollars)

While still in law school, Williams led a consortium of businesspeople that was granted one of Newfoundland's first cable television licences and started the company "Avalon Cablevision". Through major acquisitions and the very early adoption of the Internet ISP business (via theZone dial-up and later RoadRunner high-speed cable Internet services), he built Cable Atlantic into one of the largest communications companies in Atlantic Canada. As the principal owner, he sold the telecommunications portion of the business for $76 million in April 2000, to GT Group Telecom Inc. The cable TV portion of Cable Atlantic was sold to Rogers Cable Inc. for $152 million in November 2000. This sale plus the success of his extensive law practice gave him the nickname of "Danny Millions" during the early 2000s.

Williams has been practising law since 1972, becoming a financially successful lawyer, and was appointed Queen's Counsel in 1984. His firm represented many of the abused altar boys and orphans who sued the Roman Catholic Church, the Christian Brothers and the province of Newfoundland following the Mount Cashel Orphanage scandal.

Williams served as president of OIS Fisher, an oil and natural gas company (later renamed Spectrol Group), and has invested in golf courses and resorts throughout the province. He has also served as the Chairman of the Canadian Parliamentary Channel (CPAC), the Newfoundland and Labrador Film Development Corporation as well as the Provincial Government Offshore Oil Impact Advisory Council.

While he was the owner of Cable Atlantic, Williams purchased the naming rights to a sports complex in St. John's for $600,000 from Molson. Before the centre opened, however, Williams had sold Cable Atlantic to Rogers Communications to pursue his political career, but retained the naming rights. Ultimately, he chose to name the centre Mile One Stadium, based on the venue's location at the beginning of the Trans-Canada Highway.

== Early political career ==
=== Leader of the Opposition ===
In 2000, after years of speculation Williams announced his candidacy for the leadership of the Progressive Conservative Party of Newfoundland and Labrador (PC), and was returned uncontested on April 7, 2001. On June 19, 2001, he won a by-election in the Corner Brook district of Humber West.

Support for the PC party saw a big bounce when Williams became leader. Four by-elections were held during the two years he was the Opposition Leader and each seat was won by a PC candidate. In September 2001, Liberal Assemblyman (MHA) Ross Wiseman crossed the floor of the House of Assembly to join the Progressive Conservative caucus. During his time as Opposition Leader, Williams donated his legislative salary to charity.

=== 2003 election ===
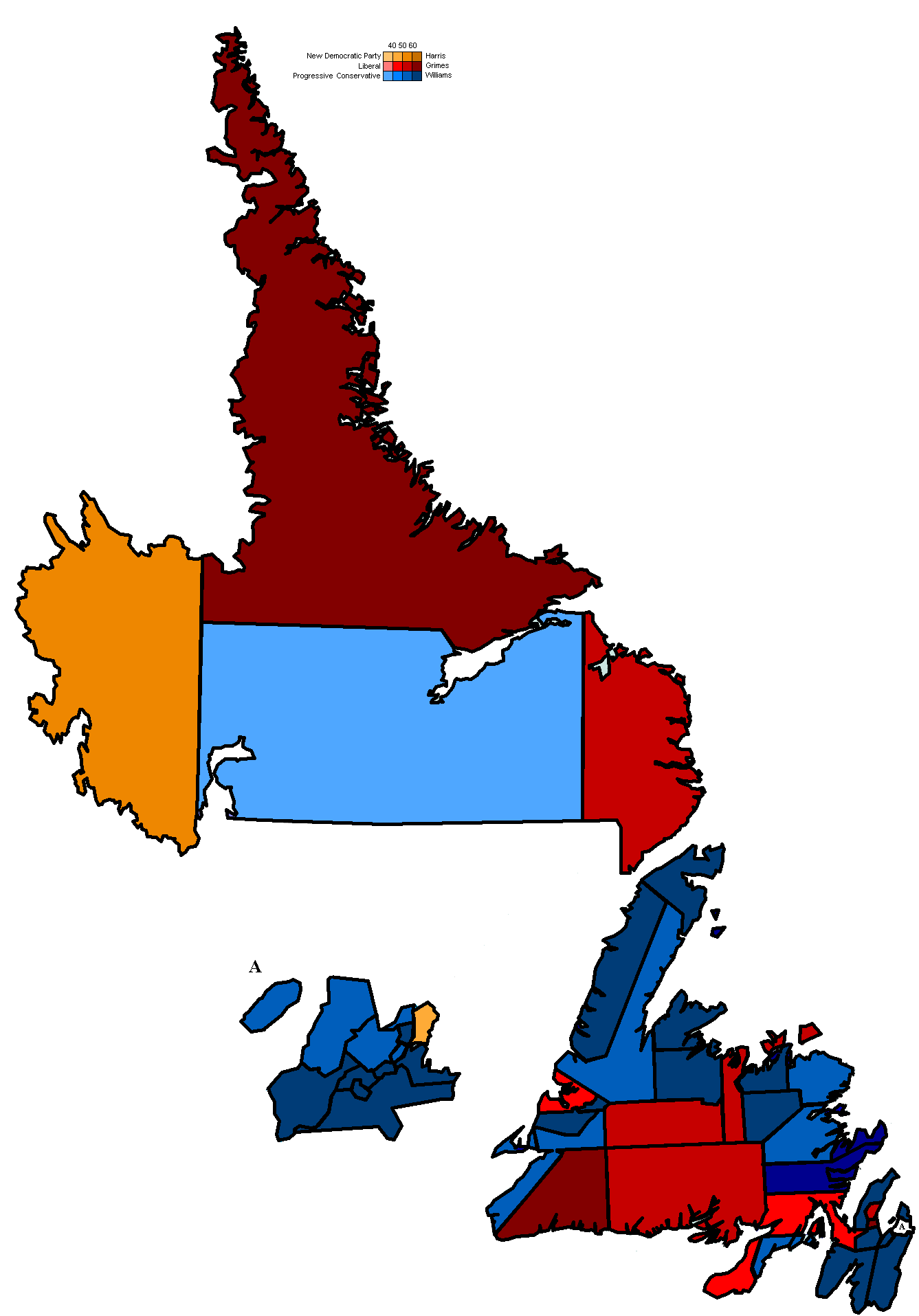
Map showing the partisan support and margins within electoral districts

Since succeeding Beaton Tulk as Premier of Newfoundland in February 2001, Premier Roger Grimes had been under opposition pressure to legitimize his mandate at the polls after winning the leadership of the Liberal Party (Liberals). On September 29, 2003, Grimes called an election for October 21, 2003.

Polls leading up to and during the election showed that the Progressive Conservatives under Williams had a substantial lead over their main competitor the Liberals, as well as the New Democratic Party (NDP). Williams campaigned for change and promised to control spending, streamline the public service and create jobs.

The Progressive Conservatives captured nearly 59% of the vote and won 34 of the 48 seats in the 2003 general election. This win marked only the third change of government in the 54 years since the province joined Canada, and ended nearly 15 years of Liberal Party rule. As party leader, Williams became the province's ninth Premier.

== Premier ==
=== First term ===
Soon after being elected, Williams announced the province's debts were so burdensome that he had no choice but to cut spending and freeze wages. Based on the projected $840 million budget deficit for 2004, the government announced sweeping cuts. A number of projects would be cut, and others delayed. Cuts included three health care facilities and a school; delayed projects included, most notably, the opening of The Rooms, the province's cultural facility that was under construction. Spurred by the administration's announcement of pay-freeze and plan to eliminate 4,000 public sector jobs, a strike was declared among the 20,000 public sector employees two days following the announcement, at midnight April 1, 2004. The strike ended nearly a month later when Williams reneged on a campaign promise and legislated the employees back to work. Later that year, the Williams government compressed health and education boards in an attempt for a more efficient delivery of services, a move that still receives criticism in the province.

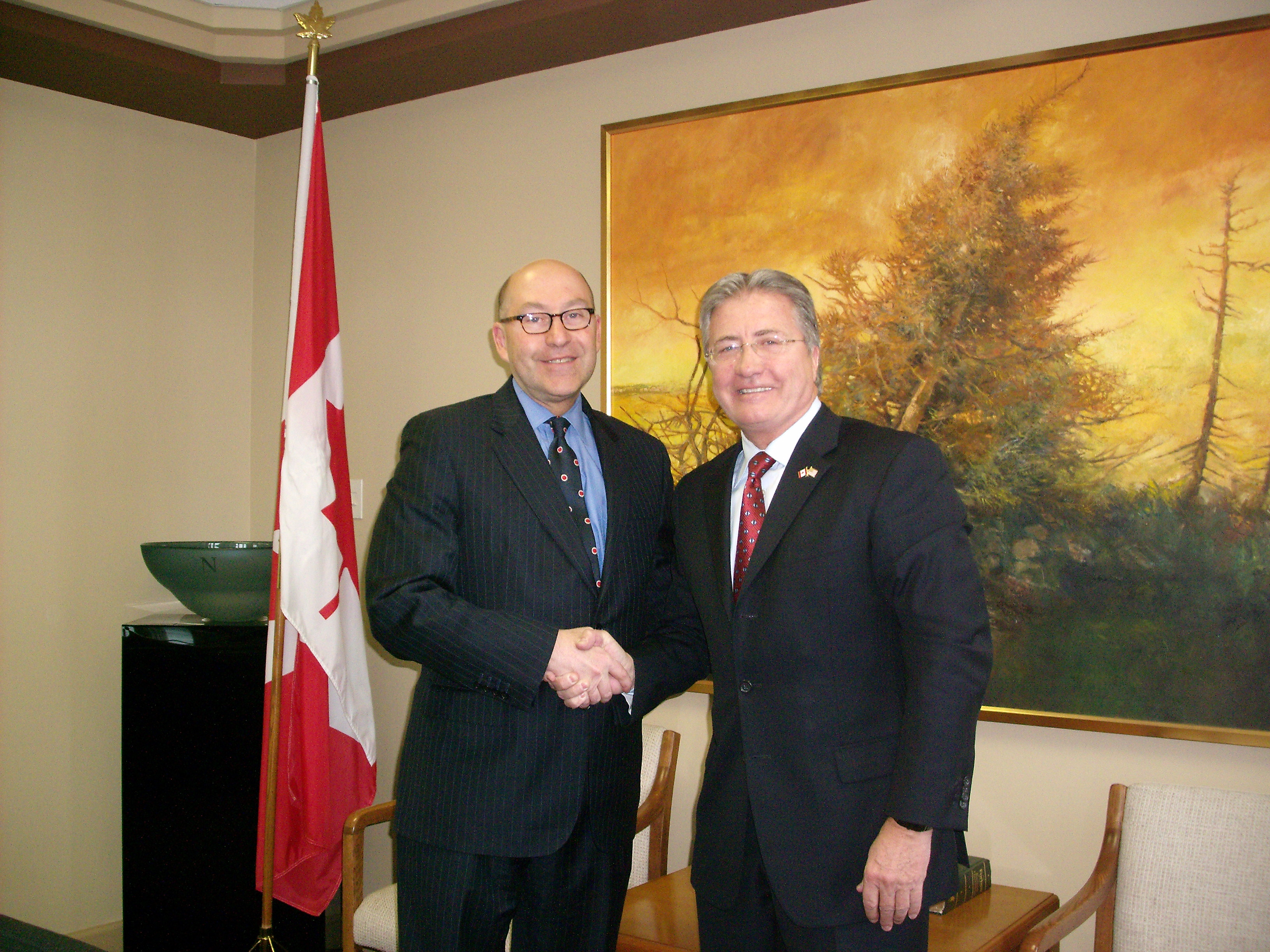
Williams alongside Ambassador Jacobson

An opinion poll conducted in June 2004 showed that support for the Premier and the Progressive Conservatives had plunged. From its nearly 60 percent share of the vote in the general election seven months earlier, support had shrunk to 41 percent, almost tied with the Liberals at 39 percent. His personal support as choice of Premier fell to 39 percent, a marked fall from 65 percent he enjoyed just six months earlier.

Williams' popularity increased when he fought with then Canadian Prime Minister Paul Martin over a campaign promise Martin had made that would lead to a revised Atlantic Accord. Martin proposed an eight-year deal that the province would keep 100 percent of offshore oil revenues, but with a cap to keep the province from surpassing the per capita tax revenue of Ontario. Williams, supported by the other provincial leaders, walked out of talks with Martin, saying that cap would cost the provincial government billions of dollars in lost revenue over the life of its three oil fields. Williams along with Nova Scotia Premier John Hamm, who also wanted the same deal as Newfoundland and Labrador, met with the Prime Minister on several occasions but a deal between Ottawa and the two provinces could not be reached. Williams raised the temperature on December 23, 2004, when he ordered the removal of all Canadian flags from provincial government buildings. On January 10, 2005, Canadian flags started flying once again in the province, and several weeks later Newfoundland and Labrador and Nova Scotia reached a deal with Ottawa. A March opinion poll indicated that support for the Williams government had rebounded to 86 percent.

On March 3, 2006, Williams appeared on Larry King Live where Paul McCartney and then-wife Heather Mills argued the seal hunt was inhumane because seal cubs were being clubbed to death. Williams said the annual hunt is supported by scientists, veterinarians and organizations like the UN and the World Wildlife Fund, and that 90% of seals are killed by bullet. Williams accused the McCartneys of being used by IFAW, Greenpeace and PETA to help them raise funds. He then invited the McCartneys to visit Newfoundland and Labrador.

=== 2007 election ===
Map showing the partisan support and margins within electoral districts

On August 21, 2007, Williams signed a Memorandum of understanding for the Hebron offshore oilfield with several major oil companies in which government royalties were exchanged for a 4.9% equity stake in the project. On September 17, 2007, Williams called a provincial election. Williams' popularity was riding at 75%, and polls during the campaign showed the Conservatives reaching up to 86 percent of voter support.

After the vote count, the Progressive Conservatives emerged with nine more seats than they held at the dissolution of the previous legislature. The party had won 69.5 percent of the popular vote, the highest popular vote share ever attained by the PC party in the province. Three Liberal incumbents, as well as NDP leader Lorraine Michael, successfully held their seats. Notably, however, Liberal leader Gerry Reid was not reelected in his own district. The next month Williams' Progressive Conservatives increased their seat count to 44 out of 48, after winning a deferred election in Grand Falls-Windsor-Buchans following the death of Liberal candidate Gerry Tobin on October 1.

=== Second term ===
On August 20, 2008, Williams and a consortium of oil companies led by Chevron Canada signed a deal to develop the Hebron oil field – the second largest oil field off the coast of the province with an estimated 700 million barrels of oil reserves, worth some $20 billion in royalties and up to 3,500 jobs from the project. Construction began in 2012; in 2017 the platform was towed to Hebron Field and oil extraction commenced. By 2020, 100 million barrels had been produced. Employment as of 2024 was 1090 (full time equivalents).

During the 2008 Canadian Federal election, Williams hit out at incumbent Prime Minister Stephen Harper and the federal administration for reneging on a 2006 election pledge to exclude non-renewable energy sources from the equalization formula. In order to thwart Harper's reelection, Williams launched the "ABC" campaign: Anything But Conservative. The ABC campaign encouraged people to vote for any other party but the Conservatives, with a goal of making sure no Conservative was elected in Newfoundland and Labrador. The campaign, which was supported by all but one member of Williams' caucus, crippled the federal party's ability to find candidates and volunteers. On election night the campaign was successful, the Conservative Party lost the three seats they had held prior to the election, and won only 17% of the popular vote in the province. Despite being shut out of Newfoundland and Labrador the Conservatives did manage to win a second minority government. Following the election Williams announced that it was time to end his battle with Ottawa, and both him and Harper signalled a willingness to work with each other.

On June 16, 2009, Williams announced the government had concluded an agreement with oil companies to expand the Hibernia oil field in which the province would have a 10 percent equity stake in the "Hibernia South" extension. The deal promised to add $13 billion to the province's coffers.

Williams has been outspoken about the Quebec Government and their crown corporation Hydro-Québec. On September 3, 2009, Williams accused Hydro-Québec of trying to block the Lower Churchill hydroelectric project to protect its own dominance in the marketplace by making a deal with New Brunswick Premier Shawn Graham to buy NB Power's nuclear and hydro generating stations, the transmission system and other assets in a massive deal. On October 29, 2009, the premiers of New Brunswick and Quebec signed a memorandum of understanding to transfer most assets of NB Power to Hydro-Québec. In the end, the deal between New Brunswick and Quebec fell apart, Williams dissatisfaction with the deal is thought to have played a role. In a speech given on June 9, 2010, Williams strongly denounced "Quebec's self interest is harming the provinces, the nation and our country's international reputation".

On February 2, 2010, it was reported that Williams would travel to the United States to have heart surgery. The move raised questions about the quality and availability of health care services and procedures in Canada's health care system. According to Deputy Premier Kathy Dunderdale, "It was never an option offered to him to have this procedure done in this province." Dunderdale refused to answer how the procedure would be paid for, or whether the procedure could have been scheduled to be performed in another province of Canada. On February 8, 2010, it was reported that Williams' surgery had been successful. On his return, Williams later defended his choice saying: "I did not sign away my right to get the best possible health care for myself when I entered politics". Williams said although he had "the utmost confidence" in his own province's health care system, his decision was to go to Mount Sinai Medical Center, Miami to undergo "a very specialized piece of surgery [by] somebody who's doing this three or four times a day, five, six days a week."

On November 18, 2010, Williams was joined by Premier of Nova Scotia, Darrell Dexter, in announcing a $6.2 billion agreement to develop the first phase of the Lower Churchill Project. Nalcor Energy, a Newfoundland and Labrador Crown corporation, signed a partnership agreement with Emera Inc. of Nova Scotia to develop the 824 megawatts Muskrat Falls. The hydro development would see power from the falls transferred from Labrador to the island of Newfoundland via an underwater transmission link through the Strait of Belle Isle. Another underwater transmission link across the Gulf of St. Lawrence would bring power to Nova Scotia. Newfoundland and Labrador will use 40 percent of the hydro power itself and will be able to shut down the oil burning Holyrood Thermal Generating Station. Emera Inc. will get 20 percent of the power for $1.2 billion to sell to customers in Nova Scotia. The remaining 40 percent will be sold by Nalcor Energy to markets in Atlantic Canada and the Northeastern United States.

=== Popularity ===
Williams' popularity is said to be unmatched in Canadian political history; his high approval ratings lasted right up until his retirement. Although Williams' premiership was considered quite controversial in Canada at large, except for his first year in office, his own provincial approval ratings and those of his government had been consistently in the 70 to 80 percent range for the majority of the time he was in office. According to polling organisation Corporate Research Associates (CRA), Williams remained by far the most popular provincial or federal leader in the country for the majority of the time he was in office.

During his first year in office Williams and his government suffered low approval ratings. However, approval for Williams and his government dramatically improved in 2005. A poll showed support for the Williams government was at 86 percent after Williams secured a deal with Federal Prime Minister Martin over equalization payments. The CRA poll in March 2006 showed 82 percent satisfaction with his government and 71 percent in William's premiership. Polling conducted throughout 2007 showed that support for Williams and his government remained high. In August 2007, the CRA found that 86 percent were satisfied with the government's performance; 77 percent supported Williams as premier, and 76 percent endorsed the PC party.

A mid-term poll by CRA in November 2009 showed that 77 percent of decided voters backed Williams' Progressive Conservatives. His popularity had been in the seventies according to polls conducted by the CRA earlier in 2009. Two other polls conducted in late 2009 showed similar results, the first of which was by Global News and Ipsos and the second was by Angus Reid. The Angus Reid poll surveyed Canadians in nine provinces and found that Williams was by far the most popular premier in Canada. 78 percent of respondents in the province approved of Williams' performance; the only other premier to receive the support of more than half of respondents in their province was Saskatchewan Premier Brad Wall with 58 percent.

A CRA poll released in March 2010 showed public support for Williams' Progressive Conservative Party that had extended to a record 80 percent of decided voters, up from 77 percent from February. Satisfaction with the government was 93 percent voters. After controversies arose surrounding the accidental expropriation of the Grand Falls-Windsor paper mill and the province's readiness to react to a possible oil spill, the Williams led government as well as his personal popularity took a slight hit. A CRA poll conducted in May 2010, showed that satisfaction with the government was at 87 percent down from 93 percent in March, the party's support had fallen five percent to 75 percent and Williams own support fell to 79 percent down from 81 percent. Even with the slight loss in support, Williams remains by far the most popular provincial or federal leader in the country.

=== Resignation ===
On November 25, 2010, Williams announced that he would step down as premier on December 3, 2010, and that Deputy Premier Kathy Dunderdale would serve as the premier of the province until a new party leader was elected in 2011. On December 3, 2010, Williams tendered his resignation as Premier and Dunderdale was sworn in as the tenth Premier of Newfoundland and Labrador, becoming the first woman to hold the office.

The week following Williams' departure from politics, CRA released a poll conducted during November showing that 90 percent of Newfoundlanders and Labradorians were either completely or mostly satisfied with the performance of the PC government. 75 percent of the respondents supported the Progressive Conservatives, while 76 percent thought Williams was the best choice to be premier.

== Post-premiership ==
=== Politics ===
In February 2011, Williams publicly campaigned with Vaughn Granter, who was the PC Candidate in Williams' former district of Humber West. Williams announced in March 2011, that he had decided not to attend a Progressive Conservative tribute dinner in his honour that was set for April 1. The tribute dinner was to be held in conjunction with the leadership convention that would swear Dunderdale in as PC leader. Following this, Williams announced that Premier Dunderdale and her staff were distancing themselves from him.

On September 5, 2011, Williams campaigned with Progressive Conservative Association of Alberta leadership candidate Gary Mar in Fort McMurray, Alberta. In October 2015, during the federal election, Williams called Stephen Harper's tactic of making the niqab ban for Muslim women at citizenship ceremonies a national issue borderline racist for how it isolated women and minorities.

=== Hockey ===
In May 2011, Williams became a major figure in an effort to bring an American Hockey League (AHL) team back to St. John's. The provincial government rejected a request by St. John's Sports and Entertainment's for a $500,000 annual subsidy, in a move that "shocked" Williams. However, on June 1, Williams announced tentative deals with St. John's Sports and Entertainment and True North Sports & Entertainment, the owner of the AHL franchise known as the Manitoba Moose. On June 10, a formal announcement was made confirming the deal to move the Manitoba Moose to Mile One Centre. On July 29, Williams held a second event at Mile One Centre where he announced that the team would be named the St. John's IceCaps, and unveiled the team's logo. However, since Williams only owned the team branding and not the AHL franchise itself, the team only lasted six seasons before there was no AHL franchise owners willing to place a team in Newfoundland as the NHL teams trended towards having its AHL affiliate closer to the parent team.

=== Real estate ===
In December 2011, Williams announced that he was behind a proposal to develop 2,400 acres of land in St. John's. The mixed-use development would include residential, commercial and industrial space. The value of the development is estimated at $5 billion over 10 to 20 years.

=== Mining ===
Williams joined Alderon Iron Ore Corp as a Special Advisor to the Executive Chairman in 2012, the company is currently involved in mining exploration in the Labrador Trough. In July 2012, Danny Williams along with Alderon, filed a lawsuit against Sierra Club Canada along with environmental activist Bruno Marcocchio and political blogger Brad Cabana for defamation from comments both on live radio and on Cabana's blog.

=== Documentary film ===
Williams is the subject of a 2014 National Film Board of Canada documentary film entitled Danny. Co-directed by Justin Simms and William D. MacGillivray, the film premiered in Halifax on September 13, 2014, at the Atlantic Film Festival. The film chronicles Williams' seven years as premier.

=== Legacy ===
The high amounts of spending done by Williams's government while he was in power have been cited by some critics for the financial situation that Newfoundland and Labrador has been in since 2015. Premier Dwight Ball claimed that the Williams spending era would be paid down by oil prices of $148/barrel USD. The Lower Churchill Project has doubled in price while oil prices (which make up a significant amount of the province's GDP) have fallen. In June 2016, a poster of Williams's face was put up by anonymous protesters near the Confederation Building alongside posters of Dwight Ball and Cathy Bennett. The poster with William's face on it had the slogan "The Running Mouth". However, governments and Premiers subsequent to Williams' time in office contributed enormously to the current economic predicament of the province. When Williams entered office, the province found itself in serious decline in terms of infrastructure and social safety nets. Under his leadership, many progressive policies were implemented. In addition to addressing crumbling provincial infrastructure (which bolstered investment and confidence in the province), Williams also championed many impactful policies. Among others, these policies include: a Poverty Reduction Strategy (which became a national model); the most progressive Student Aid package in the country; a reimagined provincial Tourism Campaign (which produced internationally acclaimed and award winning ads). Upon his departure from office, the Governor of the Bank of Canada heralded the province as an economic model for Canada.

== Electoral record ==
=== As party leader ===
2007 Newfoundland and Labrador general election
Party	Party leader	Candidates	Seats				Popular vote		
Party	Party leader	Candidates	2003	Dissol.	2007	Change	#	%	Change
Progressive Conservative	Danny Williams	48	34	34	44	+10	155,943	69.59%	+10.88%
Liberal	Gerry Reid	46	12	11	3	-9	48,598	21.69%	-11.36%
New Democratic	Lorraine Michael	36	2	1	1	No Change	19,028	8.49%	+1.63%
Independent and no affiliation		3	-	-	-	-	446	0.20%	-%
Labrador	Ron Barron	1	*	-	-	-	68	0.03%	-%
Vacant				2					
Total		132	48	48	48	-	224,083	100.00%	

2003 Newfoundland and Labrador general election
Party	Party leader	Candidates	Seats				Popular vote		
Party	Party leader	Candidates	1999	Dissol.	2003	Change	#	%	Change
Progressive Conservative	Danny Williams	48	14	19	34	+15	162,949	58.71%	+17.94%
Liberal	Roger Grimes	48	32	27	12	-15	91,729	33.05%	-16.57%
New Democratic	Jack Harris	34	2	2	2	-	19,048	6.86%	-1.37%
Independent and no affiliation		13	-	-	-	-	3,812	1.38%	-%
Total		143	48	48	48	-	277,538	100.00%	

=== As MHA ===
2007 Newfoundland and Labrador general election
Party	Candidate	Votes	%	±%
Progressive Conservative	Danny Williams	3755	87.92%	+19.20%
Liberal	Maurice Budgell	516	12.08%	-15.48%

2003 Newfoundland and Labrador general election
Party	Candidate	Votes	%	±%
Progressive Conservative	Danny Williams	3823	68.72%	–
Liberal	Edward Buckle	1533	27.56%	
NDP	Matthew Robbins	207	3.72%	

By-election, 2001 On the resignation of Paul Dicks
Party	Candidate	Votes	%	±%
Progressive Conservative	Danny Williams	3606	72.01%	–
Liberal	June Alteen	1215	24.26%	
NDP	Kris Watton	186	3.71%	
