= Cable Atlantic =

Defunct cable television provider for Newfoundland & Labrador

Cable Atlantic Inc.
- Formerly: Avalon Cablevision Ltd.
- Type: Privately held company
- Industry: Telecommunications
- Predecessors: Central Cable Systems Ltd.; Omni Cablevision Ltd.; Shellbird Cable
- Founder: Danny Williams
- Defunct: 2001
- Fate: Acquired by Rogers Communications
- Successor: Rogers Cable
- Headquarters: St. John's, Newfoundland and Labrador, Canada
- Area served: Newfoundland and Labrador
- Products: Cable television; Road Runner cable Internet; The Zone dial-up Internet
- Number of employees: 200 (2000)

Cable Atlantic was a cable television provider serving much of the population of the Canadian province of Newfoundland and Labrador. The company's primary owner throughout its history was Danny Williams, although ownership was shared with other investors from time to time.

Under the name Avalon Cablevision, the company secured the cable TV franchise for the St. John's/Mount Pearl area (on the Avalon Peninsula, hence the name). It became Cable Atlantic on March 20, 1990 after acquiring cablesystems in the three next largest Newfoundland and Labrador communities: Corner Brook (previously Shellbird Cable), Gander (previously Omni Cablevision Ltd), and Grand Falls-Windsor (previously Central Cable Systems Ltd). However, most rural areas of the province were served by N1 Cable (later Regional Cable, Persona, and most recently Eastlink).

Cable Atlantic also operated a provincial dial-up Internet provider, "The Zone", and a competitive local exchange carrier that provided telephone services to businesses and the provincial government. It also offered Road Runner cable Internet service under licence from Time Warner Cable, whereas most Canadian cable companies were at the time using the rival @Home Network backed by TCI and Comcast.

The company was sold to Rogers Cable in November 2000. Cable Atlantic's telecom division and the company's longtime 541 Kenmount Road headquarters had been sold separately to Group Telecom in April of that year, although those assets were ultimately also acquired by Rogers in 2005, after changing hands four additional times. (Note: Group Telecom was acquired in 2003 by 360networks, which then sold its Canadian assets to Bell Canada in 2004. For competitive reasons, 360's operations in eastern Canada were immediately resold to Call-Net, which in turn would be acquired by Rogers in 2005.) Other departments were moved to other parts of the city at the time of the sale. Rogers Cable's head office in St. John's was moved to 22 Austin Street. Rogers St. John's community channel (RogersTV), moved offices to Water Street with a studio in Pleasentville, then later moved to Woodgate Plaza on Kenmount Road. With company reorganization and the redevelopment of Avalon Mall / Woodgate Plaza area, it returned to 541 Kenmount Road 2017-2018.

At the time of the sale, it was rumoured that Williams would run for the leadership of the provincial Progressive Conservative Party, and the sale of his business assets added fuel to those rumours. Williams was successful in becoming PC leader the following year, and served as premier from 2003 to 2010.

It was later revealed that Williams had been very close to selling Cable Atlantic to Cogeco, but that Rogers came in with a superior last-minute bid just before the Cogeco deal was to be announced, after Rogers's deal to buy Vidéotron fell through.
