= Canada Learning Bond =

College Graduation

The Canada Learning Bond (French: Bon d'études canadien, CLB) is a grant paid by the government of Canada to assist low-income families with saving money for their children's post-secondary education. The CLB relies primarily on the National Child Benefit (NCB) program to determine which families may be eligible and the tax regulations for the Registered Education Savings Plan (RESP) to guide the eventual use of the CLB funds. As of 1 July 2005, the CLB is legislated by the Canada Education Savings Act.

== History ==
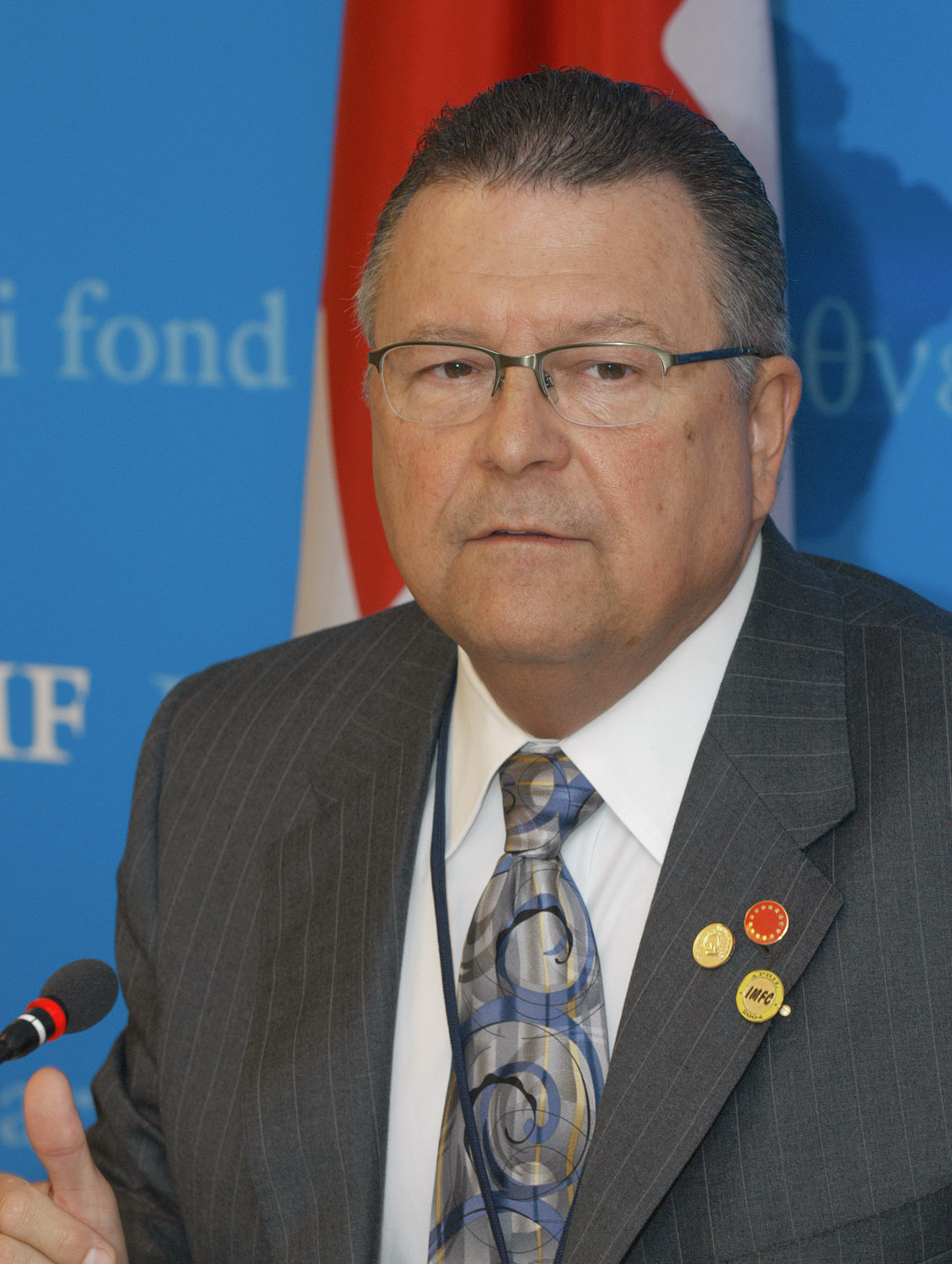
April 2004, Canadian Minister of Finance, Ralph Goodale

As part of the 2004 Canadian federal budget, the Minister of Finance Ralph Goodale introduced the Canada Learning Bond as a way to encourage low-income families to use a RESP for saving money to be used for a child's post-secondary education. The maximum net benefit outlined per child was $2000 (CA$) over fifteen years and the budget estimated over 120,000 newborn children would be eligible in 2004 with an estimated budget cost of $85 million. As part of the 2006 Canadian federal budget, Minister of Finance Jim Flaherty maintained the status quo of the CLB program by specifying that the proposed 2006 Universal Child Care Benefit (i.e., $1,200 per year per child under six) would not be considered as income when determining eligibility for the CLB. As of 2006, the program did not achieve its participation or distribution goals. Less than five percent of eligible children received the grant over the program's first two and a half years (i.e., 19,259 out of 422,048). In addition, the federal government distributed $12 million rather than the $192.5 million budgeted for the same time period. In December 2006, a spokesperson for Minister of Human Resources Diane Finley described the launch of marketing efforts to address the low awareness of the CLB program. In a presentation to the House of Commons of Canada Standing Committee on Finance in August 2007, the Canadian Association of University Teachers recommended converting the CLB, Canada Education Savings Grant, and Canada Millennium Scholarship Foundation into one annual needs-based grant program for eligible post-secondary students.

== Current program ==
The Canadian federal government provides the CLB to families who are entitled to the NCB and have children under the age of fifteen who were born after 2003. In the first year of eligibility per child, the family receives $25 to cover the cost of setting up a RESP with the child as a beneficiary and $500 payable into that RESP. After setup, the Canadian federal government provides a $100 CLB installment payment for each year the family remains entitled to the NCB and until the child turns fifteen. If an eligible family does not apply for a CLB after the birth of a child, then they have until the child's eighteenth birthday to apply and receive payments for the years the family was eligible. If the family does not apply prior to the child's eighteenth birthday, then the child can apply for their own RESP and receive the CLB as long as they do so before their twenty-first birthday. Once the beneficiary of the RESP enrolls in a qualified educational program, then the beneficiary receives the balance in the account through Educational Assistance Payments. If the beneficiary of the RESP does not enroll in an educational program after high school, then the CLB payments must be returned to the Canadian federal government because the CLB is not transferable.

== See also ==
- Registered Education Savings Plan
- Canada Education Savings Grant
