= Canada Education Savings Grant =

Government of Canada program

The Canada Education Savings Grant (French: Subvention canadienne pour l’épargne-études, CESG) is part of a Government of Canada program, administered through Employment and Social Development Canada, to assist with savings for Canadian children's higher education. Under the CESG program, the government will contribute an amount to a Registered Education Savings Plan (RESP) according to a formula which is dependent on the amount contributed and the income level of the family making the contributions. As of 1 July 2005, the CESG is legislated by the Canada Education Savings Act.

== Program ==
The grant payment is at least 20% of the total annual contributions up to $2500 per child. For lower income families, the grant may be up to 40% on the first $500, and 20% on the balance over that amount. The maximum lifetime grant limit is $7200.

Upon high school graduation, the child beneficiary may use the grant money to support either full-time or part-time studies in an apprenticeship program, a CEGEP (Collège d'Enseignement Général et Professionnel (French) in Québec), at a trade school, at a college, or at a university.

Since the program's inception in 1998, 47.1% of Canadian children under the age of 18 have received the CESG as of 2013. The government has paid $8.02 billion since 1998 to support a total of 4.84 million beneficiaries.

== History ==
=== Inception in 1998 ===
The Canada Education Savings Grant program was announced in the 1998 Canadian federal budget tabled on 24 February 1998 by Finance Minister Paul Martin. The program was retroactively started on 1 January 1998 and placed under the administration of Human Resources Development Canada. At the time the CESG consisted of a 20% matching grant for the first $2,000 of contributions in a child's RESP.

The measure was incorporated in the Budget Implementation Act, 1998 which implemented the CESG through an amendment to the Department of Human Resources Development Act.

=== 2004 Enhancements ===
In the 2004 Canadian federal budget, Ralph Goodale announced that the CESG would be enhanced for families with low-income:

- The matching rate is increased to 40% for the first $500 of contributions (families with: income ≤ $35,000);
- The matching rate is increased to 30% for the first $500 of contributions (families with: $35,000 < income ≤ $70,000).

The 20% matching rate is unchanged in other situations.

The 37th Canadian Parliament was dissolved prior to the passage of the 2004 Budget. The 2004 Canadian federal election resulted in a Liberal minority government. The enhancement of the CESG were later incorporated in the Canada Education Savings Act which was adopted on 7 December 2004 by a large majority of 273 votes for (from both Liberal, Conservative and Bloc MPs) versus 19 against (the entire NDP caucus).

=== 2007 Enhancements ===
The 2007 Canadian federal budget tabled by Jim Flaherty on 19 March 2007 contained an enhancement of both RESPs and CESG:

- RESP annual limit of $4,000 is withdrawn while the lifetime limit is raised to $50,000 per child;
- The maximum amount of CESG payable per year is increased to $500 (and $1,000 if there is unused grant room from low contributions in past years).

The maximum lifetime CESG is unchanged at $7,200.

== See also ==
- Registered education savings plan
- Canada Learning Bond
