= Alderon Iron Ore Corp. =

Canadian mining company

Alderon Iron Ore Corp
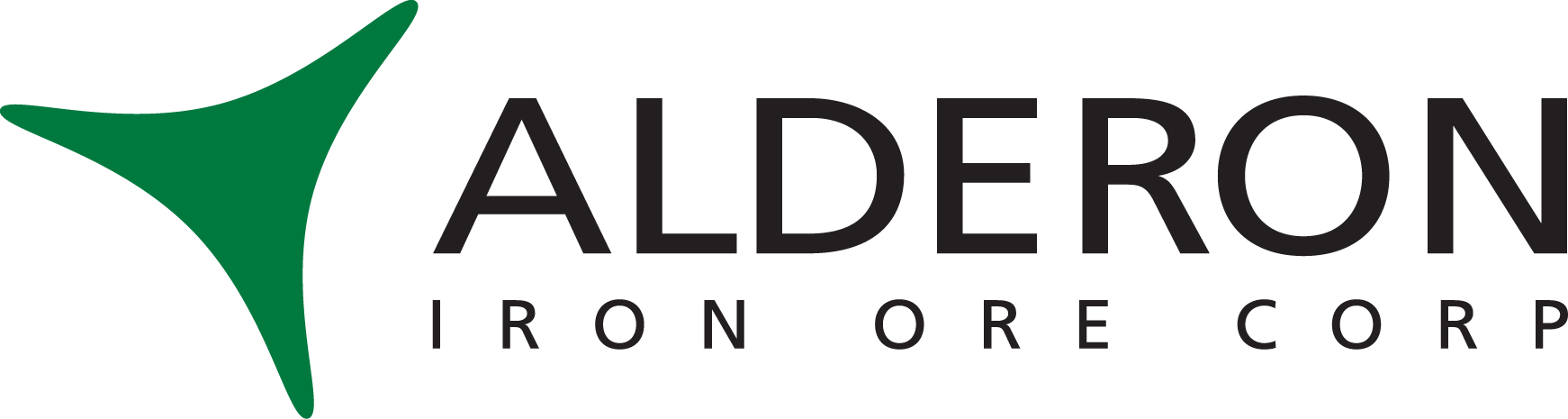
- Company type: Delisted
- Traded as: TSX: IRON (Delisted in 2020)
- Industry: Mining, Iron Production
- Headquarters: Canada, Montreal, Quebec
- Key people: Tayfun Eldem, (President & CEO); Mark Morabito, (Chairman)
- Products: Iron ore, Iron concentrate
- Website: www.alderonironore.com

Alderon Iron Ore Corp. (formerly Alderon Resource Corp.) was focused on the exploration, development and mining of an iron ore property in the southern Labrador Trough geological belt in southwestern Newfoundland and Labrador, near the Quebec border. In 2010, Alderon Iron Ore acquired the rights to the Kamistiatusset ("Kami") property in the Labrador Trough. Alderon Iron Ore was a development-stage company advancing the Kami Project located in the Labrador Trough, Canada's premier iron ore mining district. Alderon had a proven management team with strong relationships and ties to the community and government, as well as a strategic partnership with HBIS Group, China's second largest steel producer. The Kami Project, owned 75% by Alderon and 25% by HBIS through The Kami Mine Limited Partnership. The Kami Project was surrounded by three producing iron ore mines and was in close proximity to Québec NorthShore & Labrador (QNS&L). Kami wanted to produce a premium-quality iron-ore product, ideal for blending and China's clean air requirements. Alderon was developing the high-grade iron ore Kami Project to take advantage of improved iron-ore prices, reduced CAPEX requirements, and available infrastructure.

In February 2017 Alderon released an updated Preliminary Economic Assessment on the Rose Deposit of the Kamistiatusset Iron Ore Property in Western Labrador. The PEA highlighted a net present value of US$1.377 billion and internal rate of return of 23.8%. Anticipated capital costs to develop the project were estimated at 987.5 million with an estimated mine life of 24 years.

Alderon imploded in 2020.
