= Registered education savings plan =

Canadian tax shelter for college fees

A registered education savings plan (French: Régimes enregistrés d’épargne-études, RESP) in Canada is an investment vehicle available to caregivers to save for their children's post-secondary education. The principal advantages of RESPs are the access they provide to the Canada Education Savings Grant (CESG) and as a method of generating tax-deferred income.

== Tax benefits ==
An RESP is a tax shelter designed to benefit post-secondary students. With an RESP, contributions (comprising the investment's principal) are, or have already been, taxed at the contributor's tax rate, while the investment growth (and CESG) is taxed on withdrawal at the recipient's tax rate. An RESP recipient is typically a post-secondary student; these individuals generally pay little or no federal income tax due to tuition, education tax credits and the limited ability of a post-secondary student to earn taxable income. Thus, with the tax-free principal contribution available for withdrawal, CESG, and nearly-tax-free interest, the student will have a good source of income to fund their post-secondary education. If the beneficiary of an RESP decides not to pursue post-secondary education, the contributor can withdraw all contributions tax-free. However, all interest earned on contributions ("accumulated income") are taxed at the contributor's regular income-tax level, plus an additional 20 percent.

== Government grants ==
=== Federal grants ===
==== Canada Education Savings Grant ====
The Canada Education Savings Grant (CESG) is provided to complement RESP contributions, wherein the government of Canada contributes 20% of the first $2,500 in annual contributions made to an RESP. After changes introduced in the 2007 Canadian federal budget, the government may contribute up to $500 per year to a participating RESP, to a lifetime maximum of $7,200. This income is available upon withdrawal from the RESP by a post-secondary recipient, with a maximum lifetime contribution of $50,000. Any contributions over this amount are subject to taxation.

The government grants introduced in 2005, entitled Additional CESG, allowed an additional 10% or 20% for a total of an extra 30 or 40 cents on each dollar of the first $500 contributed to an RESP, depending on the family income of the beneficiary's primary caregiver. An application is made through the promoter of the RESP, which is often a bank, mutual fund company or group RESP provider.

==== Canada Learning Bond ====
The Government of Canada also provides a Canada Learning Bond (CLB) to encourage low-income families to contribute to an RESP. Families with children born on or after January 1, 2004, and who receive the National Child Benefit, will receive an additional $500 CLB when they open an RESP and $100 for each year they remain eligible.

=== Provincial grants ===
==== Alberta Centennial Education Savings Grant ====
The Alberta Centennial Education Savings (ACES) grant was introduced in 2005 by the Alberta government to encourage families to begin planning and saving for their children's post-secondary education.

The government of Alberta contributes $500 to an RESP for babies born to or adopted by Alberta residents on or after January 1, 2005. The Alberta government then contributes a $100 Alberta Centennial Education Savings Grant to students who are enrolled in school in Alberta, and have turned the age of 8, 11, or 14 in 2005 or later.

The provincial government announced in March 2013 that the program would be phased out, but did not provide a final date.

The provincial government announced, in March 2015, that the plan is closing in 2015/16 fiscal year. Applicants will no longer be accepted by RESP providers and promoters on or after July 31, 2015.

==== Saskatchewan Advantage Grant for Education Savings ====
The government of Saskatchewan has announced the Saskatchewan Advantage Grant for Education Savings (SAGES) to benefit children in the province. The legislation was to be implemented in 2013.

==== Québec Education Savings Incentive ====
The Québec Education Savings Incentive (QESI) was launched in February 2007 and is a tax measure that encourages Québec families to start saving early for the education of their children and grandchildren. Universitas Financial commissioned a financial study in 2006 recommending the creation of an education savings incentive in Quebec and gave a number of presentations for this purpose to the provincial government.

Each year, Revenu Québec can contribute an amount equal to 10% of the net contributions paid into an RESP over the course of a year, up to a maximum of $250.

== Early withdrawals ==
Any principal contributed to the RESP can be withdrawn at any time by its contributor. In this case, any eligible CESG payments on those contributions must be repaid to the Government. If the beneficiary has also received additional CESG, none of the beneficiaries in the plan will be eligible for additional CESG for the next two years. If the student elects to not attend a post-secondary institution, any accumulated interest may be withdrawn by the contributor; this is called an AIP (Accumulated Income payment). To receive this AIP, the plan must be in place for at least 10 years and all beneficiaries must be over 21 years old. This AIP is taxed as income unless it is rolled into a registered retirement savings plan (RRSP), subject to individual contribution limits and applicable rules.

== Group plans ==
In group RESPs (otherwise known as Group Scholarship RESPs), individual contributions are pooled with those of other contributors. Contributions to the plan are made according to a set schedule for the duration of the RESP contract.

On March 31, 2021, A lawsuit was filed against six Group RESP providers due to what is alleged to be hefty fees. The suit alleges that the law that capped fees at $200 was contravened by selling multiple "units." The lawsuit is currently limited in scope to plans sold in Quebec. Success can invite lawsuits in other provinces.

Most Group RESP providers charge a penalty for "subscribers" who leave the plan. Usually, the penalty is forfeiture of all interest earned. This excess "interest" is also called attrition.

== See also ==
- 529 plan (United States)
