= 2003 Canadian federal budget =

2003 Budget of the Canadian Federal Government
- Presented: 18 February 2003
- Country: Canada
- Parliament: 37th
- Party: Liberal
- Finance minister: John Manley
- Total revenue: C$186.2 billion
- Total expenditures: C$177.1 billion
- Program spending: C$141.4 billion
- Debt payment: C$35.8 billion
- Surplus: C$9.1 billion
- Debt: C$501.5 billion

The Canadian federal budget of 2003 was unveiled on February 18, 2003. It was the first budget issued by Finance Minister John Manley who was given the job in May 2002 replacing Paul Martin. It was also the last budget of Prime Minister Jean Chrétien.

In the previous fiscal year the Canadian economy had done well, despite the recent recession in the United States. The budget saw another large surplus, which was enhanced by a shift to more stringent accrual accounting announced in the budget.

The bill was largely seen as a departure from the fiscal austerity of the last several years. It had a wide range of new spending initiatives on health care, child care, defence, education, and other social programs. The budget had only limited tax cuts, mostly directed at corporations. The budget set forth a plan of gradual reductions that would see corporate taxes fall well below American levels. The most important was the reduction of the Canadian Capital Tax. Employment Insurance premiums were also cut.
