= 2000 Canadian federal budget =

2000 Budget of the Canadian Federal Government
- Presented: 28 February 2000
- Country: Canada
- Parliament: 36th
- Party: Liberal
- Finance minister: Paul Martin
- Total revenue: 194.349 billion
- Total expenditures: 174.458 billion
- Surplus: $19.891 billion

The Canadian federal budget for fiscal year 2000–01 was presented by Jean Chretien's Minister of Finance Paul Martin in the House of Commons of Canada on 28 February 2000. It was announced in Governor-General Adrienne Clarkson's 30 January 2000 Speech from the Throne. The Budget, passed as Bill C-17, included substantial tax cuts for all families whether they be poor, middle class or wealthy. On average, taxpayers were projected to receive a 15% tax cut, to be gradually implemented over the next 4 years.
