= Corporate tax in Canada =

Corporate taxes in Canada are regulated at the federal level by the Canada Revenue Agency (CRA). As of January 1, 2019 the "net tax rate after the general tax reduction" is fifteen per cent. The net tax rate for Canadian-controlled private corporations that claim the small business deduction, is nine per cent.

== Revenue from corporate income taxes ==
In 2019, the total revenue from income taxes totaled $223.6 billion, with corporate income tax accounting for $50.4 billion, personal income taxes accounting for $163.9 billion, and non-resident income taxes accounting for $9.4 billion. Seasonally adjusted corporation profits before taxes for all corporations totalled $224.3B in Q1 2019, $243B in Q2, $230.8B in Q3, $225B in Q4, and $212B in Q1 2020, according to Statistics Canada. "Canadian corporate profits finished 2019 at an all-time high" in 2019. "[O]perating profits for non-financial corporations hit an all-time high of $297.6 billion in 2019", according to National Bank Financial Inc. (NBF). The mining industry had their highest profits in eight years and the oil and gas industry had their highest profits in five years. In 2017, revenues from personal income tax amounted to $143.7B, corporate income tax, $42.2B, and non-resident income tax $7.1B.

== Federal tax rates ==
Currently, the "basic rate of Part I tax is 38% of taxable income and 28% after federal tax abatement". The general corporate tax rate on business income—the net tax rate after the general tax reduction, is 15%. For Canadian-Controlled Private Corporations (CCPCs)s eligible Small Business Deduction (SBD), the net tax rate 9% as of January 1, 2019. The provinces or territories have a dual rate—a lower rate and a higher rate which is dependent on the corporation's income eligibility for the federal SBD.

=== Dual tax rates ===
In most cases, the provinces and territories have two rates of income tax—the lower rate and the higher rate. Businesses that are eligible for the federal small business deduction (SBD) are also eligible for the lower corporate tax rate at the provincial and territorial levels. The SBD is based on "small business limits". All businesses that are not eligible for the SBD are taxed at the higher rate, which applies to all other income.

== Small business taxation ==
In 2017, the overall small business tax rate was reduced from 11% to 9%. Controversial changes to small business taxation, proposed in 2017, were introduced when Bill Morneau was Finance Minister under Prime Minister Justin Trudeau. Changes included restricting several tax planning strategies that were frequently used by small businesses, such as passive investment income and income-sprinkling for private corporations.

=== Small business deduction (SBD) ===
Canadian-controlled private corporations (CCPCs) reduce the corporate tax rate on their active business income by using the Small Business Deduction (SBD). The current tax rate for Canadian-controlled private corporations that claim the "small business deduction" (SBD), is nine per cent. The SBD is based on "small business limits" which is currently $500,000. Previously, a "CCPC using the SBD [could] claim the small business tax rate on up to $500,000 of its active business income carried on in Canada", which represented a sizable tax reduction. For almost all provinces and territories, the small-business limit is $500,000. Effective January 1, 2018, Saskatchewan increased its small-business limit to $600,000. As of January 1, 2019, Manitoba's small-business limit was raised from $450,000 to $500,000.

Another factor that determines if a corporation is eligible for the SBD is the "amount of taxable capital a CCPC and its associated corporations employ in Canada". When the taxable capital exceeds $10 million, the federal "small business limit" is reduced. "If that amount reaches $15 million, the CCPC’s active business income is no longer eligible" for the lower SBD rate. In other words, "every $1 of passive investment income earned" above the $50, 000 threshold, "has the potential to expose $5 of active business income to additional taxation."

=== Passive income investment ===
Passive income investment is income from "fixed income investments", "dividend-paying stocks", interest, capital gain, rent, royalties and other earnings that are not directly related to the corporation's active main business income. This passive income can be significant for large corporations.

New rules introduced in 2018, are based on the CCPCs "Adjusted Aggregate Investment Income" (AAII)—passive investment income—and "tie SBD eligibility to investment income earned by associated corporations." Under these new rules, taxes cannot be "avoided by using a holding company."

=== Refundable dividend tax on hand (RDTOH) ===
New rules came in effect in January 2019, related to CCPCs earning investment income, specifically, in regards to their "Refundable Dividend Tax on Hand" (RDTOH) balance. Under these rules, corporations are no longer able to "recover their RDTOH balance through the payment of eligible dividends" because the individuals receiving the dividends would see their taxes increase from 6% to 14% based depending on the province.

=== 5,500 hours minimum ===
From January 1, 2017 onward in Québec, a 5,500 minimum number of hours paid criterion was established for the provincial small-business deduction, which meant that CCPCs' employees had to have paid work for at least 5,500 hours annually in order for the CCPC to be eligible for the SBD. This applies to some sectors, including primary sectors such as agriculture, forestry, fishing, hunting, some resource-based sectors, and manufacturing and processing sectors (M&P) sector. "Special conversion rules apply to take into consideration hours worked (but not necessarily paid in the form of wages) by actively engaged shareholders who hold, directly or indirectly, shares of the corporation that carry more than 50% of the voting rights."

== Provincial and territorial corporate tax rates ==
=== CRA listed tax rates ===
According to the current CRA web page, in Newfoundland and Labrador corporate tax rates span from 3 per cent at the lowest rate to 15 per cent at highest rate; in Nova Scotia from 3% to 16%, in New Brunswick from 2.5% to 14%, in Prince Edward Island from 3%to 16%, in Ontario from 3.2% to 11.5%, in Manitoban 12% in Saskatchewan, from 2% to 12%, in British Columbia from 2% to 12%, in Nunavut from 3% to 12%, in the Northwest Territories, from 4% to 11.5%, and in Yukon from 2% to 12%.

According to a June 1, 2020 report, there are two or three levels of corporate taxes in the provinces and territories—the first includes small businesses, with income generally up to $500,000, that are eligible for the "small-business deduction" (SBD); the second includes businesses engaged in manufacturing and processing (M&P) with income greater than $500,000 that are not eligible for federal SBD (%); and the third includes general income businesses, with non-M&P income, that are not eligible for SBD (%). Québec has three levels—the rate for the first level is c. 4% to 5%, for the second level it is 11.50%, and for the third level it is 11.50%.

=== British Columbia ===
In British Columbia the lower rate of corporate income tax is 2%. Effective January 1, 2018, the higher rate is 12%. Previously, it was 11%.

=== Manitoba ===
In Manitoba, the lower rate of Manitoba's provincial corporation income tax is 0% and the higher rate is 12%.

=== New Brunswick ===
In New Brunswick the lower rate of corporate income tax is 2.5%. Prior to April 1, 2018, it 3%. The higher rate is 14%. The "New Brunswick business limit is not be subject to the federal passive income business limit reduction that applies to tax years starting after 2018."

=== Newfoundland and Labrador ===
The lower rate of Newfoundland and Labrador income tax is 3% and the higher rate is 15%. "These rates also apply to income earned in the Newfoundland and Labrador offshore area."

=== Northwest Territories ===
The lower rate of Northwest Territories income tax is 4% and higher rate is 11.5%.

=== Nova Scotia ===
Effective April 1, 2020, Nova Scotia's lower rates decreased from 3% to 2.5% and the higher rate from 16% to 14%. These "rates also apply to the income earned in the Nova Scotia offshore area."

=== Nunavut ===
The "lower rate of Nunavut income tax is 3% effective July 1, 2019. It was previously 4%...The higher rate of Nunavut income tax is 12%."

=== Ontario ===
The Ontario basic income tax rate is 11.5% and the lower rate is 3.2% effective January 1, 2020. It was lowered from 3.5% in 2018 and from 4.5% in 2017.

=== Prince Edward Island ===
The lower rate of Prince Edward Island income tax is 3% effective January 1, 2020, a decrease from 3.5% in 2018, and from 4.5% before 2018. The higher rate of income tax is 16%.

=== Saskatchewan ===
The lower rate of Saskatchewan income tax is 2% and the higher rate is 12% effective January 1, 2018. Previously, it was 11.5%. Saskatchewan is the only province to have raised its SBD levels from $500,000 to $600,000.

=== Yukon ===
The lower rate of Yukon income tax is 2% and the higher rate of tax is 12%.

=== Alberta ===
On June 29, 2020, Premier Jason Kenney announced that the corporate tax rate would be lowered to 8% from 10% on July 1, 2020.

Historically, during World War II, the provinces had temporarily ceded some of their provincial tax regulations to the federal government in "exchange for "tax rental" payments".

In the early 1960s, Alberta, and most of the provinces "entered into bilateral Tax Collection Agreement[s] (TCA) with the federal government in respect of their income taxes on individuals."

In response to the unpopular policies of then Prime Minister of Canada, Pierre Elliot Trudeau—specifically the National Energy Program—in 1981, Alberta withdrew from the centralized corporate tax administration—the TCA. This represented the "rejection of federal control over tax policy-making".

In the 2010s, the Alberta Chamber of Commerce "advocated a return to the harmonized corporate base, citing in particular a 2006 Ontario study estimating that Ontario businesses would save $90 million annually in tax, and an additional $100 million annually in compliance costs."

=== Québec ===
Québec has three levels of corporate tax rates—the rate for the first level is c. 3% to 5%, for the second level it is 11.50%, and for the third level it is 11.50%.

== Corporate tax avoidance ==
Prior to the 1990s, corporations minimized interprovincial taxes by "locating income in provinces with lower rates."

=== General Anti-Avoidance Rule (GAAR) ===
Effective on September 13, 1988, the Government of Canada's General Anti-Avoidance Rule (GAAR) was introduced as a section of the Income Tax Act. In 2005, the federal GAAR, "was substantially amended to apply to a wider array of abusive transactions" and the amendments were retroactive to 1988.

In 1993, Gulf Canada won its case against the federal government regarding the reassessment of its FY 1974 and FY 1975 corporate income taxes, which resulted in a loss of about CA$1.2 billion to the public.

=== Aggressive tax planning (ATP) ===
Aggressive tax planning (ATP) is a "global phenomenon that threatens the integrity of national tax systems and has a negative effect on public finances", according to a 2009 Québec Department of Finance working paper. The OECD's 2006 "Seoul Declaration", which had expanded the 2004 Corporate Governance Guidelines on "tax and good governance", called for OECD members to create a "directory of aggressive tax planning schemes so as to identify trends and measures to counter such schemes." The OECD said that with the liberalisation of trade and capital, along with "advances in communications technologies" has made "enforcement of national tax laws "more difficult". This had led to the rise of "structures which challenge tax rules, and schemes and arrangements by both domestic and foreign taxpayers to facilitate non-compliance with our national tax laws."

Aggressive tax planning (ATP) was "one of the top four risks of tax non-compliance in Canada", according to a 2004 Canada Revenue Agency (CRA) report.

The 2009 Québec report said that tax practice had changed in Quebec and all western economies," from simply minimizing tax burdens in a way that complies with "both the letter and the spirit of the law" to the development of aggressive tax planning that has grown vigorously in the 2000s. This "proliferation of ATP schemes" reduced "government revenues" and impaired the "integrity of the tax regime". This can refer to inter-provincial ATP tax planning that seeks to avoid both provincial and federal income tax, or an ATP scheme seeking to avoid only provincial income tax. The market for ATP schemes contributed to the increase in tax intermediary firms with "sophisticated expertise for integrated management of their clients' tax situation", such as lawyers, accountants, and investment banks.

=== Québec Shuffle and Truffles ===
In the mid-1990s, "large oil and gas companies with significant financing needs" used loopholes in provincial tax laws to decrease their taxes, that were called the Ontario shuffle and the Québec truffle.

The 2009 Québec Finance paper referred to the 1996 Québec Shuffle—that made it possible for corporations to avoid paying any provincial tax—and the 1998 and 2006 Truffles, as examples of ATP schemes. Québec's tax laws were amended to prevent Québec Shuffle rollovers by changing the tax deferral rules. The inter-provincial ATP Truffles scheme placed the "residence of a trust in a different province from the one where the beneficiaries reside." and also avoided payment of provincial corporate taxes. Tax planners were able to benefit from the lack of harmonization between Quebec and federal rules related to the taxation of trusts, through the Quebec Truffle—which is a "play on shuffle and trust".

The Québec year-end shuffle refers to a tax planning structure that allows corporations to legally avoid paying taxes. A 2017 judgement in the British Columbia Court of Appeal in Veracity Capital Corporation v. Canada held that the Québec shuffle "did not constitute an avoidance transaction" under British Columbia's General Anti-Avoidance Rule (GAAR). The case dated back to July 2002, when a company used a tax planning structure that resulted in the company avoiding paying $1,175,249 of tax on the "taxable capital gain that would otherwise have been taxed in B.C." At that time, there was a capital gains tax in British Columbia on the sale of shares. To avoid paying the tax, the company transferred shares on a rollover basis to a new listed limited partnership in Québec," Veracity Capital Corporation Veracity Capital Corporation's taxation year ending on August 31, 2002 in Québec so "small directors’ fees were paid to the B.C. resident directors in July 2002". Federally and in British Columbia, Veracite's taxation year ending on June 30, 2003. This allowed the company to "allocate 100% of the taxable capital gain resulting from the sale of the shares to B.C. for the purposes of the first year-end in Québec." After August 31, 2002, Veracity "purchased units of a listed limited partnership in Québec" with a September 30, 2002 year end. This meant that a "pro rata portion of the gross revenues and salary expense of the limited partnership would be allocated to Veracity in its capacity as unit-holder. The result under the inter-provincial allocation rules was that approximately 90% of the taxable capital gain from the sale of the shares was allocated to Québec in respect of the second year-end in B.C."

This 2017 BC court judgment is significant as it is the "first appellate level case addressing a provincial general anti-avoidance rule in Canada." The BC Court of Appeals said that since the Canadian "taxation regime is not a harmonious scheme"—it is a " patchwork where provinces have the power to legislate as they please." Therefore "not all loopholes or plans to avoid tax are ipso facto abusive" and "taking advantage of the differences between provincial rules to avoid taxation is not on its face abusive tax planning."

According to a 2013 Canadian Tax Journal article, approximately $500 million was lost in tax revenue because of the Québec Truffle.

By 2007, Ontario, Québec, and Alberta worked collaboratively to "enhance anti-avoidance provisions". Then Alberta Premier Ed Stelmach, introduced the Alberta Corporate Tax Amendment Act. Prior to the closing of these loopholes, Through the so-called Ontario shuffle, corporations that were based in Alberta could reduce their taxable income by making "interest payments to related companies based in Ontario", which in some cases meant they only paid federal, not provincial taxes. The Québec truffle referred to a scheme whereby Québec corporations based in Alberta, shifted their income earned in Alberta to "trusts based in Québec, making them immune to Alberta taxes".

In 2020, when Alberta made a deep and rapid corporate tax rate cut, from 12%, which is the average provincial corporate tax rate, to 8%, University of Toronto economist, Michael Smart, cautioned that this could result in "Ontario-based companies booking profits in Alberta to pay lower tax rates—shades of the "Québec shuffle" that occurred in the 1980s when that province slashed corporate taxes to undercut Ontario."

=== Ontario Finco structure ===
The Ontario Finco structure, which is also referred to the Ontario shuffle, refers to the "corporate group financing structure". The interest of the Ontario Finco was not subject to any provincial corporate tax, only federal tax. Prior to joining the harmonized corporate tax system in 2009, Ontario had a number of anomalies in its "tax base relative to the federal definition" with the most significant being that Ontario took the American approach to determining the residence of a corporation by basing it on the jurisdiction of incorporation.

=== Income sprinkling ===
Income sprinkling or splitting is a "strategy that can be used by high-income owners of private corporations to divert their income to family members with lower personal tax rates." Historically, under Canadian corporate tax laws, high-earning individuals could incorporate their professional corporations to take advantage of tax benefits, by including family members with a lower income in a lower tax bracket as non-voting shareholders, and pay them dividends. Prior to 2018, under the "tax on split income" (TOSI) rules, taxes of dividends that corporations paid to family members who were "under the age of 18 would be subject to "kiddie tax" and were taxed at the highest individual tax rates." In January 2018, TOSI amendments were expanded so that the highest individual tax rates applied to "all family members, regardless of their age." The high-earning individuals, for example, doctors and dentists, could pay dividends on non-voting shares to family members with a lower income saving on taxes. The Family Tax Cut act (income splitting) was repealed during the 42nd Canadian Parliament (2015–2019) under Prime Minister Justin Trudeau.

In a 2017 paper, the Royal Bank of Canada (RBC) described how the proposed changes would limit "income sprinkling" to "family members receiving "reasonable" compensation from a private corporation." It would also "limit the multiplication of claims to the lifetime capital gains exemption."
