= Fiscal imbalance in Canada =

Fiscal imbalance (French, déséquilibre fiscal) is the term used in Canada to describe a monetary imbalance between the Canadian federal government and the provincial governments.

According to the fiscal imbalance theory, the federal government achieved an important surplus by cutting its contributions towards provinces, leaving provinces with responsibilities much too expensive for their resources. The theory was further developed in the "Seguin Report", commissioned by former Parti Québécois (PQ) Premier of Quebec Bernard Landry, and completed under former Liberal Quebec Minister of Finance Yves Séguin. The federal government, run by the Liberal Party of Canada until January 2006, denied that this imbalance exists, arguing, in part, that both the federal and provincial governments have access to the same major sources of revenue and that both orders of government face significant spending pressures and limited resources. However, the Conservative Party of Canada recognizes the imbalance. Following their victory in the 2006 federal election in January, they intended a solution be found during their mandate.

A similar situation arose during the Great Depression in the 1920s when the new welfare state severely burdened the provinces, but the federal government continued to run surpluses. This resulted in the 1937-1941 Rowell-Sirois Commission, whose most important result was the removal of restrictions on how provinces could raise money, and the transfer of the expensive Unemployment Insurance program from the provinces to the federal government.

In the past few years, the major issue of fiscal imbalance has been identified by all parties of the National Assembly of Quebec. The Parti libéral du Québec (PLQ) proposes to work with the federal government to solve the problem by increasing federal transfers to Quebec. Yves Séguin, of the PLQ, proposes transferring control of the Goods and Services Tax (GST), a value-added tax, from the federal government to the Quebec government. The PQ holds that independence for Quebec will solve the imbalance, with all powers to impose taxes being once again the jurisdiction of the Quebec government. The PQ proposes to uphold efforts to convince the federal government to give money back to Quebec until then.

All major federal parties but the Liberals recognize a monetary imbalance between the federal government and the provinces, and speak of plans to reduce such. The Bloc Québécois, a sovereigntist party at the federal level, is the strongest denouncer of the situation. Prime Minister Paul Martin and his federal Liberals prefer to speak of a fiscal "pressure" on provinces, not admitting directly to the responsibility of the Canadian government. In accepting an amendment to the Throne Speech after the 2004 federal election, the federal Liberals officially acknowledged the reality of the situation.

Federal Liberals assert that it is impossible for a true fiscal imbalance to exist, as the provincial governments have access to all the same sources of revenue as the federal government. The problem is not structural, as it was in earlier years, but political. The provincial governments are unwilling to risk their popularity by raising taxes, insisting instead the extra money come from the federal government. The federal Liberals partially blame the situation on the tax cuts introduced by many of the provincial governments.

The potential solution advocated by most of the provincial premiers is that the transfer payments from the federal government to the provinces be substantially increased. This has been occurring gradually as the federal government has regularly been increasing its transfer for health care spending. The Bloc Québécois supports Yves Séguin's suggestion that the GST be given to the provinces. Gordon Campbell, the former premier of British Columbia, has proposed that the federal government take over from the provinces the responsibility for programs that provide pharmaceutical products to low-income people, the elderly and people with disabilities.

== See also ==
- Fiscal imbalance
- Politics of Quebec
- Politics of Canada
- 2003 Quebec general election
- 2004 Canadian federal election
- Economy of Canada
- Federalism
