= Atlantic Accord =

1985 agreement between Canada and Newfoundland and Labrador

The Canada-Newfoundland and Labrador Atlantic Accord is an agreement signed in 1985 between the Government of Canada and the Government of Newfoundland and Labrador to manage offshore oil and gas resources adjacent to Newfoundland and Labrador.

== Background ==
In 1979, oil was first discovered off the coast of Newfoundland and Labrador.

The Pierre Trudeau government proposed that "Newfoundland should enjoy the major share of the revenue that offshore resources are expected to generate" in 1983.

== Implementation ==
Canada–Newfoundland and Labrador Atlantic Accord Implementation Act

Parliament of Canada
- Long title: An Act to implement an agreement between the Government of Canada and the Government of Newfoundland and Labrador on offshore petroleum resource management and revenue sharing and to make related and consequential amendments
- Citation: SC 1987, c 3
- Assented to: 1987-03-25
- Status: In force (amended)

Canada-Newfoundland and Labrador Atlantic Accord Implementation Newfoundland and Labrador Act
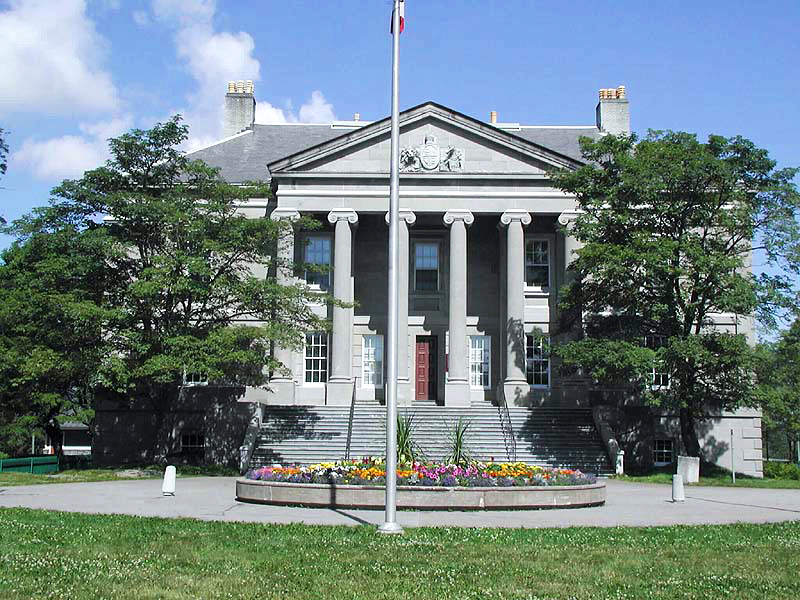

Newfoundland and Labrador House of Assembly
- Long title: An Act to implement an agreement between the Government of Canada and the Government of Newfoundland and Labrador on offshore petroleum resource management and revenue sharing
- Citation: RSNL 1990, c C-2
- Status: In force (amended)

The agreement established the Canada-Newfoundland and Labrador Offshore Petroleum Board, originally known as the Canada-Newfoundland Offshore Petroleum (C-NLOPB, formerly known as C-NOPB). The board became responsible for:

- developing resources (such as placing calls for bids)
- issuing exploration
- licensing significant discovery and production
- assessing royalties, interests and penalties
- administrating and enforcing agreements
- regulating operations
- sharing revenue

A 2003 report by PricewaterhouseCoopers revealed that the province was receiving a relatively small fraction of the revenue generated under the agreement.

In 2005, the provincial government and the federal government renegotiated the accord. At one point the provincial government ordered Canadian flags to be stripped from their poles in provincial buildings. The negotiations led to a transfer of CA$2,000,000 from the federal government to the provincial government.

In 2007, the federal government reneged on the agreement, under Stephen Harper through changes made to the equalization payments.

In 2018, the provincial government wrote to the federal government to request a review of the agreement, which was required to happen by 2019. In 2019, the federal government and the provincial government announced changes to the agreement.

In 2023, the federal government and the provincial government announced changes to the agreement, which would mean that offshore renewable energy would fall under the agreement. The amendments to the federal legislation were made under Bill C-49 which received royal assent in October 2024.

== Further developments ==
The name was also used to describe a 2005 cash transfer agreement between the Government of Canada and the governments of Nova Scotia and Newfoundland and Labrador under a similar legislative framework.
