= Mazankowski report =

The Mazankowski Report, is a commissioned report entitled "A framework for reform: report of the Premier's Advisory Council on Health" that was released on January 8, 2002. The 12-person advisory council, which was established by Ralph Klein, then Premier of Alberta in August 2001, was chaired by Don Mazankowski, who had previously served as cabinet minister under Prime Ministers Joe Clark and Brian Mulroney. The Premier's Council was charged with evaluating Alberta's health care system and formulating recommendations for reform. The Alberta government accepted all of the Council's recommendations.

== Responses to the report ==
The Alberta government accepted all 43 recommendations made by the Advisory Council on their report.

Researchers from the University of Alberta's Parkland Institute criticised the report by saying "a move towards a for-profit system isn't supported by the government's own data."

Campaign organisation Keep Medicare Public claimed that the report is "grossly exaggerating the scope of Alberta's health spending 'crisis' and its recommendations for reform would undermine the foundations of Medicare."

== Health reform at the federal level ==
The report of the Royal Commission on the Future of Health Care in Canada, also known as the Romanow Report, entitled "Building on values: the future of health care in Canada", was submitted in December 2002.

== See also ==
- Royal Commission on the Future of Health Care in Canada
- Canada Health Act
- Canada Health Transfer
- Canada Health and Social Transfer
- Indian Health Transfer Policy (Canada)
- Health care in Canada
- Canadian Institute for Health Information
- Canadian and American health care systems compared
- Canada Health Act
- Medicare (Canada)
