= Royal Commission on the Future of Health Care in Canada =

Commission on the Future of Health Care in Canada
- Also known as: Romanow Report
- Commissioner: Roy J. Romanow
- Inquiry period: 3 April 2001 – November 2002
- Authorized: Order in Council P.C. 2001-569

The Royal Commission on the Future of Health Care in Canada, also known as the Romanow Report, is a committee study led by Roy Romanow on the future of health care in Canada. It was delivered in November 2002.

Romanow recommended sweeping changes to ensure the long-term sustainability of Canada's health care system. The proposed changes were outlined in the Commission's Final Report, Building on Values: The Future of Health Care in Canada, which was tabled in the House of Commons on 28 November 2002.

Although the Report of the Royal Commission dealt with a wide range of issues, much of the early attention was paid to the recommendations with respect to the financing of health care in Canada and especially transfers from the federal government to provincial and territorial governments.

The Report set the stage for another round of federal-provincial/territorial bargaining leading to a significant agreement in September 2004 whereby the Government of Canada agreed to transfer an additional $41 billion over the next 10 years in support of an action plan on health. The new funding is meant to strengthen ongoing federal health support provided through the Canada Health Transfer (CHT) as well as focus resources on addressing the fact that Canadians, like citizens in other OECD countries, often have significant wait times for access to essential health care services.

== Issues highlighted by the Romanow Report ==
=== Aboriginal issues ===
The report identifies significant problems in the way that aboriginal health is managed. Surprisingly, this is largely not due to a lack of funding; there is simply a mismanagement of assets. Funding sources are fragmented and there is no established system to provide care. In addition, there are extensive equity concerns due to this fragmentation of funding and differential care available to different Aboriginal communities.

As a result, the report suggests that new administration procedures be put in place. Integration of on-reserve healthcare into the current system is not a popular option amongst aboriginal leaders, although serves as a reasonable option for urban aboriginal healthcare. Specifically, the report suggests the formation of Aboriginal Partnerships that are an administrative authority composed of representatives from different levels of government and the aboriginal community.

These partnerships may work in a method similar to a regional health authority. They will serve as an organization with a specific health goal, such as organizing the public health and primary care for a community. The partnership will be granted federal funds to pursue these health goals in a manner that Partnership executives agree upon. Aboriginal representation in the Partnership ensures that these services are fitting with the cultural needs of the Aboriginal community. Partnerships will also interface with the existing health system to coordinate access to resources such as diagnostics and specialized care.

In an urban setting, the Partnership will serve as a voluntary health organization that coordinates access to specific health facilities such as primary care and diagnostics. The Partnership will have similar representation from Aboriginal community ensuring that services provided in the urban environment are still sensitive to Aboriginal cultural and linguistic concerns. Partnerships are especially needed in urban settings due to the specific needs of urban Aboriginals for problems such as diabetes and addiction. Furthermore, Partnerships may serve as an additional urban community organization that interfaces with other such Aboriginal organizations to serve as activists for the socioeconomic status of Aboriginals.

An important point stressed by the Romanow report is that healthcare initiatives must be accountable towards the taxpayer and consumer. Aboriginal health is no different; Partnerships must be closely monitored and their effect on health outcomes determined. Changes in policy may be necessitated as this is a new approach.

== Romanow's recommendations ==
The conclusion of the Report set out 47 recommendations along with a timetable for their implementation.

Recommendation 1 – A new Canadian Health Covenant should be established as a common declaration of Canadians’ and their governments’ commitment to a universally accessible, publicly funded health care system. To this end, First Ministers should meet at the earliest opportunity to agree on this Covenant.

Recommendation 2 – A Health Council of Canada should be established by the provincial, territorial and federal governments to facilitate co-operation and provide national leadership in achieving the best health outcomes in the world. The Health Council should be built on the existing infrastructure of the Canadian Institute for Health Information (CIHI) and the Canadian Coordinating Office of Health Technology Assessment (CCOHTA).

Recommendation 3 – On an initial basis, the Health Council of Canada should: Establish common indicators and measure the performance of the health care system; Establish benchmarks, collect information and report publicly on efforts to improve quality, access and outcomes in the health care system; and coordinate existing activities in health technology assessment and conduct independent evaluations of technologies, including their impact on rural and remote delivery and the patterns of practice for various health care providers.

Recommendation 4 – In the longer term, the Health Council of Canada should provide ongoing advice and coordination in transforming primary health care, developing national strategies for Canada’s health workforce, and resolving disputes under a modernized Canada Health Act.

Recommendation 5 – The Canada Health Act should be modernized and strengthened by: Confirming the principles of public administration, universality and accessibility, updating the principles of portability and comprehensiveness, and establishing a new principle of accountability; Expanding insured health services beyond hospital and physician services to immediately include targeted home care services followed by prescription drugs in the longer term; Clarifying coverage in terms of diagnostic services; Including an effective dispute resolution process; and Establishing a dedicated health transfer directly connected to the principles and conditions of the Canada Health Act.

Recommendation 6 – To provide adequate funding, a new dedicated cash-only Canada Health Transfer should be established by the federal government. To provide long-term stability and predictability, the Transfer should include an escalator that is set in advance for five year periods.

Recommendation 7 – On a short-term basis, the federal government should provide targeted funding for the next two years to establish: a new Rural and Remote Access Fund; a new Diagnostic Services Fund; a Primary Health Care Transfer; a Home Care Transfer; and a Catastrophic Drug Transfer

Recommendation 8 – A personal electronic health record for each Canadian that builds upon the work currently underway in provinces and territories.

Recommendation 9 – Canada Health Infoway should continue to take the lead on this initiative and be responsible for developing a pan-Canadian electronic health record framework built upon provincial systems, including ensuring the interoperability of current electronic health information systems and addressing issues such as security standards and harmonizing privacy policies.

Recommendation 10 – Individual Canadians should have ownership over their personal health information, ready access to their personal health records, clear protection of the privacy of their health records, and better access to comprehensive and credible information about health, health care and the health system.

Recommendation 11 – Amendments should be made to the Criminal Code to protect Canadians’ privacy and to explicitly prevent the abuse or misuse of personal health information, with violations in this area considered a criminal offense.

Recommendation 12 – Canada Health Infoway should support health literacy by developing and maintaining an electronic health information base to link Canadians to health information that is properly researched, trustworthy and credible as well as support more widespread efforts to promote good health.

Recommendation 13 – The Health Council of Canada should take action to streamline technology assessment in Canada, increase the effectiveness, efficiency and scope of technology assessment, and enhance the use of this assessment in guiding decisions.

Recommendation 14 – Steps should be taken to bridge current knowledge gaps in applied policy areas, including rural and remote health, health human resources, health promotion, and pharmaceutical policy.

Recommendation 15 – A portion of the proposed Rural and Remote Access Fund, the Diagnostic Services Fund, the Primary Health Care Transfer, and the Home Care Transfer should be used to improve the supply and distribution of health care providers, encourage changes to their scopes and patterns of practice, and ensure that the best use is made of the mix of skills of different health care providers.

Recommendation 16 – The Health Council of Canada should systematically collect, analyze and regularly report on relevant and necessary information about the Canadian health workforce, including critical issues related to the recruitment, distribution, and remuneration of health care providers.

Recommendation 17 – The Health Council of Canada should review existing education and training programs and provide recommendations to the provinces and territories on more integrated education programs for preparing health care providers, particularly for primary health care settings.

Recommendation 18 – The Health Council of Canada should develop a comprehensive plan for addressing issues related to the supply, distribution, education and training, remuneration, skills and patterns of practice for Canada’s health workforce.

Recommendation 19 – The proposed Primary Health Care Transfer should be used to “fast-track” primary health care implementation. Funding should be conditional on provinces and territories moving ahead with primary health care reflecting four essential building blocks – continuity of care, early detection and action, better information on needs and outcomes, and new and stronger incentives to achieve transformation.

Recommendation 20 – The Health Council of Canada should sponsor a National Summit on Primary Health Care within two years to mobilize concerted action across the country, assess early results, and identify actions that must be taken to remove obstacles to primary health care implementation.

Recommendation 21 – The Health Council of Canada should play a leadership role in following up on the outcomes of the Summit, measuring and tracking progress, sharing information and comparing Canada’s results to leading countries around the world, and reporting to Canadians on the progress of implementing primary health care in Canada.

Recommendation 22 – Prevention of illness and injury, and promotion of good health should be strengthened with the initial objective of making Canada a world leader in reducing tobacco use and obesity.

Recommendation 23 – All governments should adopt and implement the strategy developed by the Federal, Provincial and Territorial Ministers Responsible for Sport, Recreation and Fitness to improve physical activity in Canada.

Recommendation 24 – A national immunization strategy should be developed to ensure that all children are immunized against serious illnesses and Canada is well prepared to address potential problems from new and emerging infectious diseases.

Recommendation 25 – Provincial and territorial governments should use the new Diagnostic Services Fund to improve access to medical diagnostic services.

Recommendation 26 – Provincial and territorial governments should take immediate action to manage wait lists more effectively by implementing centralized approaches, setting standardized criteria, and providing clear information to patients on how long they can expect to wait.

Recommendation 27 – Working with the provinces and territories, the Health Council of Canada should establish a national framework for measuring and assessing the quality and safety of Canada’s health care system, comparing the outcomes with other OECD countries, and reporting regularly to Canadians.

Recommendation 28 – Governments, regional health authorities, health care providers, hospitals and community organizations should work together to identify and respond to the needs of official language minority communities.

Recommendation 29 – Governments, regional health authorities, and health care providers should continue their efforts to develop programs and services that recognize the different health care needs of men and women, visible minorities, people with disabilities, and new Canadians.

Recommendation 30 – The Rural and Remote Access Fund should be used to attract and retain health care providers.

Recommendation 31 – A portion of the Rural and Remote Access Fund should be used to support innovative ways of expanding rural experiences for physicians, nurses and other health care providers as part of their education and training.

Recommendation 32 – The Rural and Remote Access Fund should be used to support the expansion of telehealth approaches.

Recommendation 33 – The Rural and Remote Access Fund should be used to support innovative ways of delivering health care services to smaller communities and to improve the health of people in those communities.

Recommendation 34 – The proposed new Home Care Transfer should be used to support expansion of the Canada Health Act to include medically necessary home care services in the following areas: Home mental health case management and intervention services should immediately be included in the scope of medically necessary services covered under the Canada Health Act; Home care services for post-acute patients, including coverage for medication management and rehabilitation services, should be included under the Canada Health Act; and palliative home care services to support people in their last six months of life should also be included under the Canada Health Act.

Recommendation 35 – Human Resources Development Canada, in conjunction with Health Canada should be directed to develop proposals to provide direct support to informal caregivers to allow them to spend time away from work to provide necessary home care assistance at critical times.

Recommendation 36 – The proposed new Catastrophic Drug Transfer should be used to reduce disparities in coverage across the country by covering a portion of the rapidly growing costs of provincial and territorial drug plans.

Recommendation 37 – A new National Drug Agency should be established to evaluate and approve new prescription drugs, provide ongoing evaluation of existing drugs, negotiate and contain drug prices, and provide comprehensive, objective and accurate information to health care providers and to the public.

Recommendation 38 – Working collaboratively with the provinces and territories, the National Drug Agency should create a national prescription drug formulary based on a transparent and accountable evaluation and priority-setting process.

Recommendation 39 – A new program on medication management should be established to assist Canadians with chronic and some life-threatening illnesses. The program should be integrated with primary health care approaches across the country.

Recommendation 40 – The National Drug Agency should develop standards for the collection and dissemination of prescription drug data on drug utilization and outcomes.

Recommendation 41 – The federal government should immediately review the pharmaceutical industry practices related to patent protection, specifically, the practices of evergreening and the notice of compliance regulations. This review should ensure that there is an appropriate balance between the protection of intellectual property and the need to contain costs and provide Canadians with improved access to non-patented prescription drugs.

Recommendation 42 – Current funding for Aboriginal health services provided by the federal, provincial and territorial governments and Aboriginal organizations should be pooled into single consolidated budgets in each province and territory to be used to integrate Aboriginal health care services, improve access, and provide adequate, stable and predictable funding.

Recommendation 43 – The consolidated budgets should be used to fund new Aboriginal Health Partnerships that would be responsible for developing policies, providing services and improving the health of Aboriginal peoples. These partnerships could take many forms and should reflect the needs, characteristics and circumstances of the population served.

Recommendation 44 – Federal and provincial governments should prevent potential challenges to Canada’s health care system by: Ensuring that any future reforms they implement are protected under the definition of “public services” included in international law or trade agreements to which Canada is party; and reinforcing Canada’s position that the right to regulate health care policy should not be subject to claims for compensation from foreign-based companies.

Recommendation 45 – The federal government should build alliances with other countries, especially with members of the World Trade Organization, to ensure that future international trade agreements, agreements on intellectual property, and labour standards make explicit allowance for both maintaining and expanding publicly insured, financed and delivered health care.

Recommendation 46 – The federal government should play a more active leadership role in international efforts to assist developing nations in strengthening their health care systems through foreign aid and development programs. Particular emphasis should be placed on training health care providers and on public health initiatives.

Recommendation 47 – Provincial, territorial and federal governments and health organizations should reduce their reliance on recruiting health care professionals from developing countries.

== See also ==
- Canada Health Act
- Canada Health and Social Transfer
- Canada Health Transfer
- Canadian and American health care systems compared
- Canadian Institute for Health Information
- First Nations and diabetes
- Health care in Canada
- Indian Health Transfer Policy (Canada)
- Mazankowski report
- Medicare (Canada)
