= History of medicine in Canada =

Hospitals in Canada were initially places which cared for the poor; as those with higher socioeconomic status were cared for at home. In Quebec during the 18th century, a series of charitable institutions, many set up by Catholic religious orders, provided such care.

The first medical schools were established in Lower Canada in the 1820s. These included the Montreal Medical Institution, which is the McGill University Faculty of Medicine today. In the mid-1870s, Sir William Osler changed the face of medical school instruction by introducing a hands-on approach. The College of Physicians and Surgeons of Upper Canada was established in 1839, and in 1869 it was permanently incorporated. In 1834, William Kelly, a surgeon with the Royal Navy, introduced the idea of preventing the spread of disease by sanitation measures following epidemics of cholera. In 1892, Dr. William Osler wrote the landmark text The Principles and Practice of Medicine, which dominated medical instruction in the West for the following half-century. Around this time, a movement began that called for the improved healthcare for the poor, focusing mainly on sanitation and hygiene. This period saw important advances including the provision of safe drinking water to most of the population, public baths and beaches, and municipal garbage services to remove waste from the city. During this period, medical care was severely lacking for the poor and minorities such as First Nations.

== 18th century ==
A 1797 petition in the Upper Canada Gazette to introduce a smallpox vaccination effort in Newark, Upper Canada and Lincoln County

Hospitals were initially places which cared for the poor; Others were cared for at home. In Quebec (formerly known as Canada (New France) and then as Lower Canada), a series of charitable institutions, many set up by Catholic religious orders, provided such care. As the country grew, hospitals grew with them. They tended to be not-for-profit, and were run by municipal governments, charitable organizations, and religious denominations (both Catholic and Protestant). These organizations tended to be at arm's length from government; they received subsidies from provincial governments to admit and treat all patients, regardless of their ability to pay. Dr. David Parker of the Maritimes was the first to operate using anesthetic. One of the first "modern" operations, the removal of a tumor, was performed by William Fraser Tolmie in British Columbia.

== 19th century ==
The first medical schools were established in Lower Canada in the 1820s. These included the Montreal Medical Institution, which is the faculty of medicine at McGill University today; in the mid-1870s, Sir William Osler changed the face of medical school instruction throughout the West by introducing a hands-on approach and U.F.T. The College of Physicians and Surgeons of Upper Canada was established in 1839, and in 1869 was permanently incorporated. In 1834, William Kelly, a surgeon with the Royal Navy, introduced the idea of preventing the spread of disease by sanitation measures following epidemics of cholera. In 1871, female physicians Emily Howard Stowe and Jennie Kidd Trout won the right for women to be admitted to medical schools and granted licences from the College of Physicians and Surgeons of Ontario. In 1883, Emily Stowe led the creation of the Ontario Medical College for Women, affiliated with the University of Toronto. In 1892, Osler wrote the landmark text The Principles and Practice of Medicine, which dominated medical instruction in the West for the next 40 years. Around this time, a movement began that called for improved health care for the poor, focusing mainly on sanitation and hygiene. This period saw important advances, including the provision of safe drinking water to most of the population, public baths and beaches, and municipal garbage services to remove waste from the city. During this period, medical care was severely lacking for the poor and minorities such as First Nations

== 20th century ==
The 20th century saw the discovery of insulin by Frederick Banting and his colleagues, Charles Best, John Macleod, and James Collip, in 1922. For this, Banting and Macleod of the University of Toronto won the 1923 Nobel Prize in Physiology and Medicine. Dr. Wilder Penfield, who discovered a successful surgical treatment for epilepsy called the "Montreal procedure", founded the Montreal Neurological Institute in 1934.

The early 20th century saw the first widespread calls for increased government involvement, and the idea of a national health insurance system had considerable popularity. During the Great Depression, calls for a public health system were widespread. Doctors who had long feared such an idea reconsidered, hoping a government system could provide some stability, as the depression had badly affected the medical community. However, governments had little money to enact the idea. In 1935, the United Farmers of Alberta passed a bill creating a provincial insurance program, but they lost office later that year and the Social Credit Party scrapped the plan due to the financial situation in the province. The next year a health insurance bill passed in British Columbia, but its implementation was halted over objections from doctors. William Lyon Mackenzie King promised to introduce such a scheme, but while he created the Department of Health, he failed to introduce a national program.

=== The beginning of coverage ===
Canadian health care spending for 1970 to 2007 compared with other nations

It was not until 1947 that the first Canadian province introduced near universal health coverage. Saskatchewan had long had a shortage of doctors, leading to the creation of municipal doctor programs in the early 20th century, in which a town would subsidize a doctor to practice there. Soon after, groups of communities joined to open union hospitals under a similar model. There had thus been a long history of government involvement in Saskatchewan health care, and a significant section of it was already controlled and paid for by the government. In 1946, the Co-operative Commonwealth Federation government in Saskatchewan passed the Saskatchewan Hospitalization Act, which guaranteed free hospital care for much of the population. Tommy Douglas had hoped to provide universal health care, but the province did not have the money.

In 1950, Alberta's Social Credit Party also introduced a public health care plan. Alberta, however, created Medical Services (Alberta) Incorporated (MS(A)I) in 1948 to provide prepaid health services. This scheme eventually provided medical coverage to over 90% of the population.

In 1957, the majority Liberal government under Louis St. Laurent passed the Hospital Insurance and Diagnostic Services Act to fund 50% of the cost of such programs for any provincial government that adopted them. The HIDS Act outlined five conditions: public administration, comprehensiveness, universality, portability, and accessibility. These remain the pillars of the Canada Health Act.

By 1961, all ten provinces had agreed to start HIDS Act programs. In Saskatchewan, the act meant that half of their current program would now be paid for by the federal government. C.C.F. Premier Woodrow Lloyd decided to use this freed money to extend the health coverage to also include physicians. Despite the sharp disagreement of the Saskatchewan College of Physicians and Surgeons, Lloyd introduced the law in 1962 after defeating the Saskatchewan doctors' strike in July.

=== Medical Care Act ===
The programs in Saskatchewan and Alberta proved a success and the federal government of Lester B. Pearson introduced the Medical Care Act in 1966 that extended the HIDS Act cost-sharing to allow each province to establish a universal health care plan – an initiative that was drafted and initiated by the Liberal Party and supported by the New Democratic Party (NDP). It also set up the Medicare system. In 1984, the Canada Health Act was passed under a majority Liberal government, which prohibited user fees and extra billing by doctors. In 1999, Prime Minister Jean Chrétien and most premiers reaffirmed in the Social Union Framework Agreement that they are committed to health care that has "comprehensiveness, universality, portability, public administration and accessibility."

== See also ==
- Healthcare in Canada
- Healthcare in the United States
- History of public health in Canada
- History of public health in the United States
