= Canada Health Transfer =

Canadian government payment transfer program

The Canada Health Transfer (CHT; French: Transfert canadien en matière de santé) is the Canadian government's transfer payment program in support of the health systems of the provinces and territories of Canada. The program was originally combined with the Canada Social Transfer in a program known as the Canada Health and Social Transfer. It was made independent from the Canada Health and Social Transfer program on April 1, 2004 to allow for greater accountability and transparency for federal health funding led by then prime minister Paul Martin.

== Overview ==
Canada Health Transfer payments by year since FY2005

Unlike Equalization payments, which are unconditional, the CHT is a block transfer; the funds must be used by provinces and territories for the purposes of "maintaining the national criteria" for publicly provided health care in Canada (as set out in the Canada Health Act).

The CHT is made up of a cash transfer. In 2008-09, CHT cash transfer payments from the federal government to the provinces and territories were $22.6 billion and tax point transfers were worth $13.9 billion. The cash transfer is expected to grow to $28.6 billion in 2012-2013, a growth rate of approximately six per cent. Annual cash levels are set in legislation up to the 2013-14 fiscal year as a result of the September 2004 Health Accord between the federal government and the provinces/territories.

While the CHT is allocated on an equal per capita basis, the CHT cash component is not because it takes into account the value of provincial/territorial tax points. The value of a tax point represents the amount of revenue that is generated by one percentage point of a particular tax (in the case of the CHT and the CST, the personal income tax or the corporate income tax). Since provinces do not have identical economies and, therefore, have unequal capacity to raise tax revenues, a tax point is worth more in a wealthy province than in a poorer province.

Currently Alberta and Ontario, the two provinces with the highest revenue raising ability, receive lower per capita CHT cash payments than the other provinces.

However, beginning in 2014-15, the Canada Health Transfer allocation to provinces will be determined solely on an equal per capita cash basis and no longer include tax point transfers. According to economist Livio Di Matteo, this will result in 'a particularly large windfall to Alberta.'

The CHT, which is set to top $36 billion in 2016-17, is now divided among the provinces on a purely per-capita basis.

== History ==
=== Inception (2003) ===
The Canada Health Transfer was created by the 2003 First Ministers Health Accord signed by the provincial premiers and Jean Chrétien, prime minister of Canada at the time. The accord, signed on 3 February 2003, is a compromise between the two levels of governments, as the provincial premiers did not obtain a federal contribution as large as suggested in the Romanow Report. Jean Chrétien left satisfied from the meeting, talking of a deal on a fundamental reform whereas the provincial premiers showed disappointment. The Premier of Quebec, Bernard Landry even mentioned that the deal was an example of predatory federalism.

These difficult negotiations were held in a context of controversy over the existence of a fiscal imbalance between the federal government and the provinces. The 2003 Health Accord introduced several measures to improve the healthcare system in Canada, notably introducing the Canada Heath Transfer starting on 1 April 2004 to increase transparency and accountability on the use of federal transfers.

=== 2004 Ten-Year Agreement (2004–2014) ===
Little over a year thereafter on 15 September 2004 another accord on healthcare was signed during a First Ministers Conference. This 10-year plan outlined $18 billion in increased transfers to the provinces over 6 years, notably through increases in the CHT:

- The CHT was to be increased by $3 billion in 2004-05 and $2 billion in 2005-06;
- A new CHT base set at $19 billion starting in 2005-06, greater than suggested in the Romanow Report;
- An escalation factor set at 6% starting in 2006-07.

=== 2011 Reform (2014–2024) ===
Jim Flaherty, federal minister of Finance, announced in December 2011 a reform package for the CHT to take over from the 2004 Agreement after 2014. The reform plans for 2 successive phases:

- The 6% escalation factor is maintained through 2016-17;
- Starting in 2017-18 the escalation factor is abolished and replaced by an indexation on nominal GDP with a floor at 3% starting in 2018-19.

The latter phase was heavily criticized by some provincial ministers, notably Dwight Duncan (Ontario) who pointed out that the abolition of the 6% escalation factor in favour of a 3%-minimum escalation would withdraw 36 billion dollars of financing to the provinces.

On 2 December 2020, a Bloc motion asking the federal government to increase health transfers by the end of 2020 was adopted by 176 votes against 148 with the support of both the Conservative Party and the NDP.

Starting in 2024-2025, the population by province statistic used for the computation of the CHT is based on the July 1 estimate and no longer the June 1 estimate.

=== 2023 Reform (2024–2028) ===
On 7 February 2023 the government announced that the CHT would grow at a minimum rate of 5% per annum for fiscal years 2023-2024 to 2027-2028 through annual top‑up payments. Only provinces who have reached an arrangement with the federal government pursuant to the Working together to improve health care for Canadians federal framework will qualify for the top-up. Such agreements should contain provisions improving collection and sharing of health information

The first agreement was signed with the province of British Columbia on 10 October 2023. All provinces eventually reached an agreement with the Federal Government by the 1 December 2024 deadline, the last province to sign being Quebec on 27 March 2024.

== See also ==
- Indian Health Transfer Policy (Canada)
- Canada Health Act
- Canada Health and Social Transfer
- Health care in Canada
- Canadian Institute for Health Information
- Canadian and American health care systems compared
- Medicare (Canada)
