= Revised Statutes of Canada =

The Revised Statutes of Canada (French: Lois révisées du Canada, R.S.C. or RSC) consolidates current federal laws in force, incorporating amendments into acts, adding new substantive acts enacted since the last revision and deleting rescinded acts. Supplements to the RSC contain new or amended statutes, while consolidations republish laws for convenience without changing their legal effect. The Statutes of Canada (SC) are the compilation of all the laws passed by the Parliament.

== History ==
There have been six revisions: in 1886, 1906, 1927, 1952, 1970, and 1985.

== Publication ==
The Publication of Statutes Act does not apply to the Revised Statutes.

== Iterations of revised statutes ==
- The Revised Statutes of Canada RSC 1896 Volume 1, Volume 2 on Google Books.
- The Revised Statutes of Canada RSC 1906 Volume 1, Volume 2, Volume 3, Volume 4.
- The Revised Statutes of Canada RSC 1952 Volume 1, Volume 2, Volume 3, Volume 4, Volume 5, Volume 6.
- The Revised Statutes of Canada RSC 1970 Index, Volume 1, Volume 2, Volume 3, Volume 4, Volume 5, Volume 6, Volume 7.
