= Experience modifier =

In the insurance industry in the United States, an experience modifier or experience modification is an adjustment of an employer's premium for worker's compensation coverage based on the losses the insurer has experienced from that employer. An experience modifier of 1 would be applied for an employer that had demonstrated the actuarially expected performance. Poorer loss experience leads to a modifier greater than 1, and better experience to a modifier less than 1. The loss experience used in determining the modifier typically comprises three years but excluding the immediate past year. For instance, if a policy expired on January 1, 2018, the period reflected by the experience modifier would run from January 1, 2014 to January 1, 2017.

== Methods of calculation ==
Experience modifiers are normally recalculated for an employer annually by using experience ratings. The rating is a method used by insurers to determine pricing of premiums for different groups or individuals based on the group or individual's history of claims. The experience rating approach uses an individual's or group’s historic data as a proxy for future risk, and insurers adjust and set insurance premiums and plans accordingly. Each year, a newer year's data is added to the three year window of experience used in the calculation, and the oldest year from the prior calculation is dropped off. The other two years worth of data in the rating window are also updated on an annual basis.

Experience modifiers are calculated by organizations known as "rating bureaus" and rely on information reported by insurance companies. The rating bureau used by most states is the NCCI, the National Council on Compensation Insurance. But a number of states have independent rating bureaus: California, Michigan, Delaware, and Pennsylvania have stand-alone rating bureaus that do not integrate data with NCCI. Other states such as Wisconsin, Texas, New York, New Jersey, Indiana, and North Carolina, maintain their own rating bureaus but integrate with NCCI for multi-state employers.

The experience modifier adjusts workers compensation insurance premiums for a particular employer based on a comparison of past losses of that employer to what is calculated to be "average" losses of other employers in that state in the same business, adjusted for size. To do this, experience modifier calculations use loss information reported in by an employer's past insurers. This is compared to a calculation of expected losses for a company in that line of work, in that particular state, and adjusted for the size of the employer. The calculation of expected losses utilizes past audited payroll information for a particular employer, by classification code and state. These payrolls are multiplied by Expected Loss Rates, which are calculated by rating bureaus based on past reported claims costs per classification.

Errors in experience modifiers can occur if inaccurate information is reported to a rating bureau by a past insurer of an employer. Some states (Illinois and Tennessee) prohibit increases in experience modifiers once a workers compensation policy begins, even if the higher modifier has been correctly calculated under the rules. Most states allow increases in experience modifiers if done relatively early in the term of the workers compensation insurance policy, and most states prohibit increases in experience modifier late in the term of the policy.

The detailed rules governing calculation of experience modifiers are developed by the various rating bureaus. Although all states use similar methodology, there can be differences in details in the formulas used by independent rating bureaus and the NCCI.

In many NCCI states, the Experience Rating Adjustment plan is in place, allowing for the 70% reduction in the reportable amount of medical-only claims. That is, for claims where there has been no payment to the worker for lost time, but only for medical expenses. This gives employers an incentive to report all claims to their insurers, rather than trying to pay for medical-only claims out of pocket. Discounting medical-only claims in the experience modifier calculation greatly reduces the impact of medical-only claims on the modifier.

== Formula and calculations ==
The formula primarily used by the NCCI is the following.

$\frac{I+(C*(1-A)+G)+(A*F)}{E+(C*(1-A)+G)+(A*C)}$

A = Weight Factor
G = Ballast
I = Actual Primary Losses
H = Actual Incurred Losses
F = Actual Excess Losses  (H-I)
E = Expected Primary Losses
D = Expected Incurred Loses
C = Expected Excess Losses (D-E)

The formula is broken down into 3 main categories or subsections for understanding.

1. Primary Losses
  - Primary losses show up as both I and E in the above formula, E is for "Expected" primary losses vs actual. This expected value is determined based on a company's payroll cost with a little actuarial calculations.
  - $I$
  - $E$
2. Stabilizing Value
  - This is a calculation based on expected excess losses, a weighting factor, and a Ballast factor.
  - The weighting factor and Ballast factor are determined from proprietary calculations that are not published publicly.
  - $(C*(1-A)+G)$
3. Ratable Excess
  - Using the weighting factor the Ratable excess is simply the excess losses times this factor.
  - $(A*F)$
  - $(A*C)$

These 3 categories are summed up, with Actual numbers divided by Expected numbers, notice that the Stabilizing value does not change between the numerator and denominator.

$\frac{ActualPrimaryLosses + StabilizingValue + ActualRatableExcess}{ExpectedPrimaryLosses + StabilizingValue + ExpectedRatableExcess}$

=== A note about losses ===
In the EMR calculation there are 4 fundamental losses that are necessary for the calculation, they are:

1. D = Expected Incurred Losses
2. E = Expected Primary Losses
3. H = Actual Incurred Losses
  - Claims under $2,000.
4. I = Actual Primary Losses
  - All claims including Actual Incurred Losses

The losses that are not part of this fundamental 4 are,

1. C = Expected Excess Losses
  - $(D-E)$
2. F = Actual Excess Losses
  - $(H-I)$

== Examples ==
Unemployment insurance is experience rated in the United States; companies that have more claims resulting from past workers face higher unemployment insurance rates. The logic of this approach is that these are the companies that are more likely to cause someone to be unemployed, so they should pay more into the pool from which unemployment compensation is paid. Unemployment insurance is financed by a payroll tax paid by employers. Experience rating in unemployment insurance is described as imperfect, due in large part to the fact that there are statutory maximum and minimum rates that an employer can receive without regard to its history of lay-off. If a worker is laid off, generally the increased costs to the employer due to the higher value of unemployment insurance tax rates are less than the UI benefits received by the worker.
