= Job lock =

Aspect of employment

The term job lock is used to describe the inability of an employee to freely leave a job because doing so will result in the loss of employee benefits (usually health or retirement related). In a broader sense, job lock may describe the situation where an employee is being paid higher than scale or has accumulated significant benefits, so that changing jobs is not a realistic option as it would result in significantly lower pay, less vacation time, etc.

== Overview ==
Because the greatest source of insurance for most Americans is Employer Provided Health Insurance (EPHI) and an employee cannot take their EPHI with them when they leave their job, benefits-related job lock is a concern in the United States.

The nonportability of EPHI is what causes workers to get locked into their present jobs, hence the term job lock. Bridget Madrian argued in 1994 that the link between EPHI and labor market mobility was an important factor in evaluating several proposals to reform the US health care system. The study by Madrian (1994) estimated that job-lock reduced the voluntary turnover rate of those with EPHI by 25 percent.

Legislative efforts that have attempted to address health-insurance related job lock in the US are the Consolidated Omnibus Budget Reconciliation Act of 1985 (COBRA) and the Health Insurance Portability and Accountability Act of 1996 (HIPAA). However, employers can require their former workers to pay 102 percent of the full premium for COBRA among many other hurdles and HIPAA doesn't ensure that workers who change jobs will have access to health insurance coverage on the new job or that the coverage offered will be affordable. Thus, neither COBRA nor HIPAA ensures affordability of health insurance—the main cause of job lock.

== Causes ==
The potential for less extensive health coverage at the new job increases the financial risk associated with moving jobs, making change in jobs a very costly endeavor, so workers are more likely to stay locked into their current jobs instead of risking the job transfer.

If employees knew that all their illnesses would receive identical coverage regardless of whether they worked, where they worked, or how long they had been on the job, health insurance would not be a deterrent to worker mobility.

While health insurance may be purchased on an individual basis in states that permit medical underwriting, individuals with health conditions may be declined coverage as well as face high premiums or benefit exclusions.

An example of a job lock due to a defined benefit pension plan would be someone who has been working for a company for 20 years, thus accruing a higher retirement income benefit. If they leave to work for another company their benefits are reset and they eventually realize a lower level of retirement benefits.

== Prevalence ==
A 1987 National Medical Expenditure Survey (NMES) that sampled married men in the United States aged 20–55 found job mobility rates were 30–31% lower among those with employment-provided health insurance coverage, compared with those without it. An NMES literature review in the same year found that studies typically reported a 20–40% reduction in mobility rates due to employment-related health insurance. A 1984 Panel Study of Income Dynamics examining mobility rates among full-time workers aged 25–55 found no statistically significant results. A Survey of Income and Program Participation (SIPP) (1985, 1986, 1987) found that state and federal policy to mandate continuation of coverage increased the job mobility of prime-age male workers. A 1984 SIPP found that for dual-earner married men and women, there was "strong evidence" of job lock among women, but "weak evidence" of job lock among men.

When attempting to estimate how frequently job lock occurs, one must control for outside factors that may influence a worker's decision other than the risk of losing health care. Other factors can include initial wages and expected wage offers at new employment, other fringe benefits, experience, and job security.

== Impact ==
Job lock has three negative implications for society. One implication is that those who want to switch jobs prefer another job because there is a higher utility associated with it (e.g. better suits their skills and talents). However, if they are “stuck” at a job, the negative externality is that they are being inefficient workers and not as productive for the company and society. Workers are discouraged from switching to jobs where they are more efficient producers, and this immobility of labor resources leads to a lower level of overall productivity and national income.

The second implication is that the high risk consumers are more likely to face job lock for fear of losing coverage for their routine medical expenditures (they know their expected value of health bills). Employers offer health insurance benefits to ensure that their workers are healthy and, therefore, productive workers. However, since job lock is common in the high risk employees, employers are ultimately keeping the high risk employees as a part of their company.

The third implication has been coined by economists as "entrepreneurship lock". Similar to the issue of job lock, an “entrepreneurship lock” occurs when a person is hesitant to leave his or her job and become an entrepreneur, out of fear for losing health insurance and other benefits associated with the waged job. However, in this case they are not leaving for a separate job, but rather self-employment. Employer provided health insurance has been shown to significantly decrease the number of self-employed, and the bundling of health insurance coverage and employment together, has a negative impact on business creation in the US. Public health insurance (like in Europe) has been found to have a positive impact on the supply of businesses in an economy, because of the entrepreneur's positive contributions to the economy through job creation, innovation and economic growth. The entrepreneurship lock has a negative impact on both society and on the employee. In terms of society, decreased self-employment and entrepreneurship may have a negative impact on innovation. Furthermore, entrepreneurship has been shown to increase life satisfaction when compared to salary positions.

== See also ==
- Switching barriers
- Golden handcuffs – extra pay, to encourage an employee to stay with the company
