= Canadian Institute for Health Information =

Canadian not-for-profit organization

Canadian Institute for Health Information (CIHI)
- Type: Private, not-for-profit
- Industry: Health care, health indicators, biostatistics, health informatics
- Founded: 1994
- Headquarters: Canada
- Number of locations: 4 locations
- Key people: Anderson Chuck, President and CEO
- Products: Health Information, Reports
- Number of employees: 1000
- Website: www.cihi.ca

The Canadian Institute for Health Information (CIHI) is an independent, not-for-profit organization, that is almost fully funded by Health Canada, that provides information on Canada's health systems and the health of Canadians. CIHI provides comparable and actionable data and information that are used to accelerate improvements in health care, health system performance and population health across Canada.

== Historical overview ==
CIHI was incorporated under the Canada Corporations Act in 1994. Federal, provincial, and territorial governments created CIHI as a "not-for-profit, independent organization dedicated to forging a common approach to Canadian health information". CIHI has a unique mandate to make health information "publicly available" to Canadians.

CIHI is governed by a 16-member Board of Directors that links federal, provincial and territorial governments with non-governmental health groups. Board members represent all health sectors and regions of Canada. The membership of the Board is dominated by Deputy Ministers of Health, although it does add a small number of academics to its associates.

CIHI has offices in: Toronto and Ottawa as well as branches in Montreal, and Victoria.

== Mandate ==
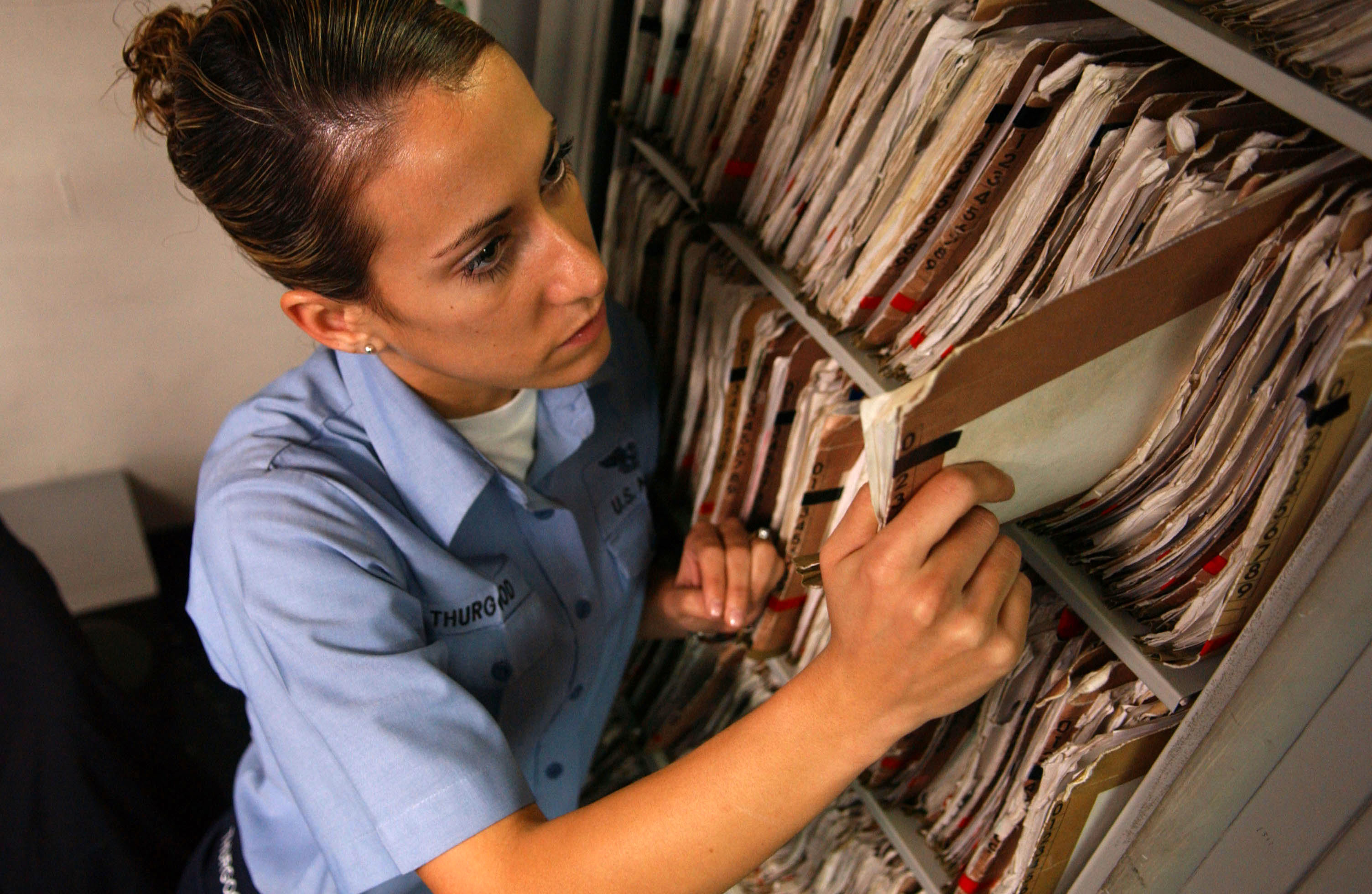
A medical record folder being pulled from the cabinet

CIHI's core mandate is to deliver comparable and actionable information to accelerate improvements in health care, health system performance and population health across the continuum of care.

Stakeholders use the broad range of health system databases, measurements and standards, together with evidence-based reports and analyses, in their decision-making processes. CIHI protects the privacy of Canadians by ensuring the confidentiality and integrity of the health care information.

CIHI produces various reports to support policy makers and health systems research.

== Data sharing agreements ==
CIHI tracks data in the different provinces with the help of information that is provided by hospitals, regional health authorities, medical practitioners and government bodies. This information is used by these various bodies to assess the various facets of our health care system and use it as a planning tool. There are several different submission applications available, some being system specific.

The Electronic Data Submission Service (eDSS), a data transmission tool, is used by institutions and organizations (such as hospitals) to submit data files securely to CIHI. eDSS requires a registered client access codes that provides a user the ability to submit data to CIHI.

Other applications include the Canadian MIS Database Submission reports provide feedback to those providing the data, ensuring that the data provided meets the technical requirements of the MIS standards, these are private reports that can only be viewed by a selected representative. The CJRR web based data submission tool allows those included in the Canadian Joint Replacement Registry to enter and submit data and produce various reports over the internet in real time. The Home Care Reporting System (HCRS) submission report provides those authorized with secure and timely access to reports generated by through from the data that is provided by HCRS. The e-Management Reports tool allows clients to see a web-based snapshot of all of their data submissions to six of CIHI's data holdings. Users can also access summaries of their submissions, statistics on error rates and timeliness.

Data requests

Researchers, decision-makers and health managers can request specific data from one or more of CIHI's databases. Data can be retrieved at an aggregate or record level. CIHI responds to data requests on a cost-recovery basis, which costs $160 an hour for Canadian health care facilities, media (data requests only), governments, not-for-profit health agencies, universities (except for students through the Graduate Student Data Access Program), health professionals and researchers from the public sector (Price A clients), OR $320 an hour for private commercial operations (including but not limited to software vendors and consultants), foreign clients (Price B clients) and others not qualifying for Price A.

Graduate Student Data Access Program

CIHI has set up a Graduate Student Data Access Program (GSDAP) that provides qualifying graduate students with access to CIHI's data at no cost whatsoever. Graduate students may only use this program in order to fulfill academic requirements of their program.

The objective of the GSDAP is to:

- To build the capacity of graduate students to undertake health service research;
- To increase awareness of CIHI and CIHI's data holdings, and the importance of data quality and privacy, as graduate students pursue health service careers.

Students must be conducting research and can access data through the various databases that fall under the following subject headings, health services, health spending and health human resources. Their research must fall in line with CIHI's mandate "to provide accurate and timely information that is required for sound health policy, effective management of the health care system and public awareness of health determinants."

== Databases ==
CIHI manages a number of Canadian health databases. These include:

The Health Personnel Database
- National Physician Database (NPDB)
- Registered Nurses Database (RNDB)
- Pharmacist Database (PDB)
- Occupational Therapist Database (OTDB)
- Medical Radiation Technologist Database (MRTDB)
- Medical Laboratory Technologist Database (MLTDB)
- Physiotherapist Database (PTDB)
- Scott's Medical Database (SMD)

CIHI health spending databases

- Canadian Management Information System Database (CMDB)
- National Health Expenditure Database (NHEX)

Health services information

- Discharge Abstract Database (DAD)
- National Rehabilitation Reporting System (NRS)
- National Prescription Drug Utilization Information System (NPDUIS)
- Organization for Economic Co-operation and Development (OECD) Health Database (Canadian Segment)
- National Ambulatory Care Reporting System (NACRS)
- Canadian Joint Replacement Registry (CJRR)
- National Trauma Registry (NTR)
- Therapeutic Abortions Database (TADB)
- Ontario Mental Health Reporting System (OMHRS)
- Hospital Morbidity Database (HMDB)
- National Health Expenditure Database (NHEX)
- Canadian Organ Replacement Register (CORR)
- Continuing Care Reporting System (CCRS)
- Hospital Mental Health Database (HMHDB)
- Canadian Management Information System Database (CMDB)
- Canadian Multiple Sclerosis Monitoring System (CMSMS)

Each CIHI database record is accompanied by Data Quality Documentation that considers coverage, collection and response, and general data limitations. This documentation is informed by the CIHI Data Quality Framework, which outlines a data quality work cycle, dimensions of data quality (Accuracy, Timeliness, Comparability, Usability, Relevance), and guidelines for data quality assessment reports. Each database is also subject to a Privacy Impact Assessment.

Provincial database management

CIHI also plays a role in provincial database management. Although the Ontario Case Costing Initiative (OCCI) is a Ministry of Health and Long-Term Care (MOHLTC) database, it depends on "methodology... based on the Canadian Institute for Health Information (CIHI) MIS Guidelines". CIHI also manages the Ontario Mental Health Reporting System (OMHRS), an Ontario exclusive database. Under the OMHRS, "hospitals collect and submit information to CIHI. CIHI collects and processes MDS-MH data and provides... outcome measures and quality indicators reports to the hospitals". This provincial reporting system is "scalable [and] designed for pan-Canadian usage and expansion... to other Canadian jurisdictions".

Vendor licensing

CIHI furthermore provides vendor licensing for OMHRS and other databases; "vendors providing... data collection software to participating facilities must be licensed with CIHI". These databases depend on CIHI's Vendor Licensing Agreement. Vendors must renew their license annually.

== Canadian Population Health Initiative (CPHI) ==
The Canadian Population Health Initiative is a significant component of CIHI's outreach strategy. The CPHI was created and integrated with CIHI in 1999 with funding from Health Canada as part of the Roadmap I project. CPHI's specific focus is expanding the public's knowledge of population health issues by accomplishing two main goals: fostering a better understanding of factors that affect the health of individuals and communities; and contributing to the development of policies which reduce inequities and improve the health and well-being of Canadians. CPHI achieves these goals mainly through funding population health research, gathering and analyzing population health data, and providing the public and policy-makers alike with numerous reports, presentations, and other publications.

CPHI reports are released regularly in its main publication Improving the Health of Canadians alongside Health of the Nation, an e-newsletter that was launched in February 2004 in conjunction with the organization's flagship series. In addition to these regular reports, CPHI has also released numerous other publications and products covering a range of topics that have been identified by CPHI as priority issues throughout its history. From 2004 to 2007, CPHI reporting focused mainly on the issues of obesity, place and health, and youth health. Between 2007 and 2010, CPHI's priority themes included mental health, gaps and inequalities in health care services, geographical disparities in health, and promoting healthy weights.

== Electronic health records ==
In 2003 Canada Health Infoway Inc. and the CIHI signed a Memorandum of Understanding that formalized a partnership to develop and maintain standards required in support of Electronic Health Record (EHR) data definitions and standards in Canada. Infoway led the development of EHR Solution standards and acted as the overall program manager for EHR standards-related work, whereas CIHI's operated as the preferred partner in the development of these standards. CIHI's role also encompassed continued responsibility for data definitions, content standards and classification systems because of CIHI's widely recognized role as leader in the development of health informatics standards and records, and its record of successful collaborations with other health organizations in Canada. This initiative was aimed mainly at improving primary health care (PHC) in Canada, the most commonly experienced type of health care among Canadians. Interoperable EMRs are intended to assist in ensuring that PHC clinicians have timely and relevant information necessary to deliver, coordinate and administer care. Additionally, EMR information generated at the point of service can also be used to support quality improvement initiatives, such as clinical program management, research, and monitoring the health of the population, as well as to improve the efficiency of the health care system overall.

CIHI led the project and achieved a major milestone in 2011 with the establishment of the Draft Pan-Canadian Primary Health Care Electronic Medical Record Content Standard. The PHC EMR CS consists of 106 data elements that are commonly found in EMRs, used to support both primary uses of EMR data, such as reminders and alerts for patients with chronic conditions, and health system uses, such as a jurisdictional diabetes management registry. Moving forward, CIHI and its partners' plans include establishing more products and services that facilitate the adoption and implementation of the PHC EMR CS in addition to enacting strategies and plans for the longer-term governance and maintenance of the PHC EMR CS so that it remains clinically and technically relevant in the future.

== As a research tool ==
CIHI uses data from governments and hospitals across Canada to determine comparative statistics and costing algorithms that are available for use by healthcare ministries, hospital boards and the general public. According to former CIHI president and CEO Richard Alvarez, CIHI's scope of research and data tracking is wide-ranging and broad. In a 2000 interview, Alvarez said of CIHI: "You name it, we track it," including subjects such as physician migration patterns, availability of nurses, supply and demand of organs, and survival rates for transplant patients. For example, in 2000 CIHI determined that the rate of caesarean births in different regions of the country varied from a low of 12% to a high of 28%. This CIHI generated information was then used by hospital boards to measure themselves against the national and international benchmark (15% in 2000).

A 2009 study in the journal Chronic Diseases in Canada compared perinatal information in the CIHI's Discharge Abstract Database (DAD) with information found in a range a smaller clinically focused databases. According to findings of the researches, CIHI's DAD data compared favourably with the other databases and proved accurate for many of the diagnoses/procedures examined. The authors of the report concluded by supporting the use of the data in the CIHI DAD for national perinatal surveillance and research, with a caveat that appropriate inference rest on an understanding of clinical practice and the use of sensitivity analyses to identify robust findings.

The CIHI DAD is used to identify patients admitted for hip fracture surgery to any acute care hospital in Canada between 2003 and 2012 in the Canadian Collaborative Study of Hip Fractures.

== Privacy and security ==
CIHI ensures the confidentiality, integrity and availability of its health information through a comprehensive and integrated privacy and security program. Its Privacy and Security Risk Management Framework outlines how the organization approaches data governance, and maintains privacy and security protection. CIHI enacts numerous policies and practices to prohibit personal identification, one key policy being strict levels of data suppression.

In the past, some news media outlets have raised concerns about the safety of personal health records in large medical/science databases like CIHI. In 2001, a Toronto Star article expressed fears that large health information vendors like CIHI could potentially leak the private health information of Canadians. The article suggested that the identities of individuals who had abortions and profiles of the mentally ill could potentially be leaked from CIHI's databases if proper security practices were not in place. The article also surmised that the greatest danger to patient and research subject privacy was the possibility of CIHI's health information being compromised through involvement with commercial entities. However, the findings of a three-year review by the Information and Privacy Commissioner of Ontario (IPC) published in a 2008 report allayed some of these concerns and largely supported CIHI's assertion that the organization's security policies, procedures and protocols ensure high standards of privacy protection. According to the report, the "IPC is satisfied that CIHI continues to have in place practices and procedures that sufficiently protect the privacy of individuals whose personal health information it receives and that sufficiently maintain the confidentiality of that information," and that as of October 31, 2008, the IPC was satisfied that CIHI met the requirements of the Personal Health Information Protection Act.

Since 2005, CIHI has maintained prescribed entity status under the Personal Health Information Protection Act (PHIPA). Prescribed entity status gives an organization access to personal health data from government health information custodians, without patient consent.

== See also ==
- Canada Health Act
- Canada Health Transfer
- Canada Health and Social Transfer
- Indian Health Transfer Policy (Canada)
- Health care in Canada
- Canadian and American health care systems compared
- Medicare (Canada)
- Health Evidence Network of Canada
