= Hospital Insurance and Diagnostic Services Act =

Repealed Canadian legislation for health care funding

Parliament of Canada
- Long title: An Act that reimbursed one-half of provincial and territorial costs for hospital and diagnostic services administered under provincial and territorial health insurance programs
- Enacted by: Parliament of Canada
- Assented to: May 1, 1957
- Commenced: July 1, 1958

Legislative history
- Bill title: Bill 320
- Introduced by: Paul Martin Sr., Minister of National Health and Welfare
- Status: Repealed

The Hospital Insurance and Diagnostic Services Act (French: Loi sur l’assurance-hospitalisation et les services diagnostiques, HIDS) is a statute passed by the Parliament of Canada in 1957 that reimbursed one-half of provincial and territorial costs for hospital and diagnostic services administered under provincial and territorial health insurance programs. Originally implemented on July 1, 1958, with five participating provinces, by January 1, 1961, all ten provinces were enlisted. The federal funding was coupled with terms and conditions borrowed from the Saskatchewan Hospital Services Plan, introduced in 1947 as the first universal hospital insurance program in North America. In order to receive funding, services had to be universal, comprehensive, accessible and portable. This stipulation was dropped in 1977 with the Established Programs Financing Act and then reinstated in 1984 in the Canada Health Act. Widely acknowledged as the foundation for future developments in the Canadian health care system, the HIDS Act was a landmark example of federal-provincial cooperation in post-war Canada.

== Background ==
Prior to World War II, health care in Canada was privately funded and delivered, with the exception of services provided to the sick poor that were financed by local governments. The experience of the 1930s left many Canadians in challenging financial situations. As personal financial situations deteriorated, the municipal governments were overwhelmed. Though the provinces provided relief payments for food, clothing, and shelter, additional medical costs were beyond the capacity of most of the provincial budgets. Many Canadians were not receiving adequate medical care, and those that did were overwhelmed with the associated costs. As such, preventable diseases and deaths were still common occurrences.

Ten years of depression, followed by six years of war, formed the social context of the ambitious federal Green Book proposals. In a bid for unprecedented cooperation between the federal and provincial governments, these initiatives formed the foundations of a national program for social security, including provisions for health insurance. However, the failure to come to a consensus on the required allocation of tax resources at the Dominion-Provincial Conference in August 1945 precluded adoption and delayed subsequent action. Although the Green Book proposals were not adopted, they effectively created an appetite for government-funded health services.

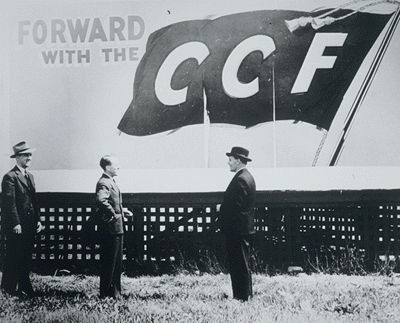
Cooperative Commonwealth Federation Party banner

Despite a lack of commitment for federal funding, Saskatchewan proceeded with a plan for provincial hospital insurance. From the collective efforts of the "wheat economy" came a cooperative movement towards efficient agencies to deliver services to Saskatchewan’s sparse population. Strong local engagement contributed to the creation of the union hospital system and municipal hospital care plans. However, a solution to the problem of providing medical and hospital services to a population reeling from the devastating effects of the depression required a greater provincial contribution. The Co-operative Commonwealth Federation won their first majority government in 1944. Continuing the Liberal health insurance platform that introduced "A Bill Respecting Health Insurance," Tommy Douglas, as the new premier, signalled his commitment to the provision of health services by assuming the role of Health Minister as well. By 1947, Saskatchewan introduced the first universal hospital insurance program in North America.

Saskatchewan's decision to launch the Saskatchewan Hospital Services Plan accelerated and influenced the development of other provincial insurance plans. The British Columbia Hospital Insurance Service was passed in early 1948 and followed soon after by the Alberta insurance system. The success of these provincial plans combined with the volume of illness and associated costs, in addition to provincial disparities in health coverage, fuelled debate on the topic of a federally funded health service. There was much disagreement as to the appropriate scope, funding allocation, and administration of such a plan.

After several years of debate between the stakeholders, including Canadian medical professional associations and the provincial governments, the federal government made an offer to fund approximately one half of the national cost of diagnostic services and in-patient hospital care for provinces that implemented insurance plans. Five provinces, namely British Columbia, Alberta, Saskatchewan, Ontario, and Newfoundland, accepted the proposal, laying the groundwork for a Canadian health insurance plan.

== Overview ==
On May 1, 1957, the HIDS Act was formally legislated in Canada in response to the increasing pressures for national comprehensive health insurance. Under the Act, the federal government agreed to fund approximately 50% of the costs of provincial or territorial insurance plans for hospital and diagnostic services. Formally, federal funding comprised 25% of the per capita costs for hospital services in Canada plus 25% of the per capita costs for hospital services in the province or territory multiplied by the number of insured persons in that jurisdiction. In practice this meant that provinces who spent more than the national average on a per-capital basis would receive a transfer covering less than 50% of its expenditures.

Funding was made available to any province or territory that agreed to make insured hospital services available to the region under uniform provisions.

=== Provisions ===
Participating provinces and territories were obligated to satisfy four funding conditions as follows:

- Comprehensiveness: All-encompassing in-patient and out-patient hospital services as well as diagnostic services were to be made available under the insurance plan.
- Universality: Services were to be made available to all residents of the province or territory.
- Accessibility: Services were to be made reasonably accessible to insured persons in a manner that did not preclude or impede access either directly or indirectly.
- Portability: Provincial plans were to provide coverage for out-of-province Canadian residents who were insured by home provincial or territorial plans.

Provinces and Territories were also obligated to limit co-payments and other "deterrent" fees to ensure that patients were not placed under financial burden at the point of care. Though there was no other explicit provision preventing provinces and territories from demanding financial contribution for services from patients, such charges would have reduced the federal contribution since, under the cost-sharing arrangement, federal funding was proportional to provincial and territorial contributions. Therefore, the Act intrinsically deterred provinces and territories from charging patients for services.

=== Coverage ===
Provincial and territorial insurance plans were to cover acute, convalescent, and chronic care of patients, including diagnostic services and in-patient drug administration in hospital facilities. However, coverage was not provided for hospitals for tuberculosis, mental hospitals, nursing homes, capital expenditures, or administrative costs.

=== Funding ===
Each province and territory was to be responsible for administering its own plan; therefore, each had the right to decide how to raise its proportion of funding for the insurance program, either through insurance premiums or taxation.

=== Delivery ===
Under the Act, insured services could only be delivered by hospitals, most of which were private entities. Hospital employees including physicians, laboratory technicians, and radiologists were to be paid via a fee-for-service model negotiated with the provincial or territorial administrative body.

The passage of the HIDS Act was the first milestone in the evolution of national health insurance in Canada and provided the foundation for all future Canadian Health legislation.

== Outcomes ==
By 1961, almost all Canadians were entitled to comprehensive hospital care benefits, protecting them from large hospital bills. The HIDS act enabled hospital operations that were not previously feasible and facilitated access to care for who could not otherwise afford it.

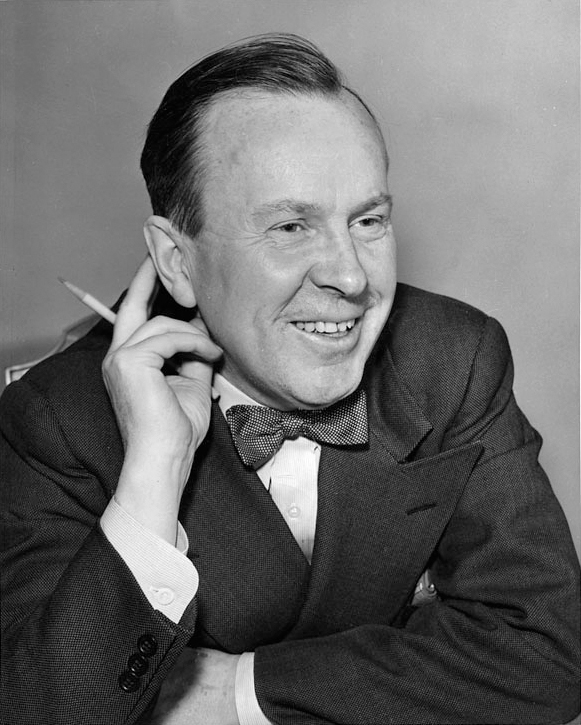
Lester B. Pearson

The HIDS Act laid the foundation for other notable developments in the Canadian health care system. One of the criticisms of the Act was that it did not cover medical services, which in 1955 comprised approximately 40% of national healthcare costs. Following the adoption of the HIDS Act, then, extending health insurance to cover additional medical services was next on the federal agenda. At the Federal-Provincial Conference in July, 1965, the decision for Medicare was made. Then, on July 1, 1967, the governing Liberals under Lester B. Pearson introduced the Medical Care Act, covering 50% of physician costs outside of a hospital.

Together, the HIDS Act and Medical Care Act brought hospital and physician services to all Canadians, regardless of their ability to pay. Though criticized for imposing federal priorities on provincial jurisdiction, provincial governments were left with no option other than to meet the federal provisions or forgo supplementary funding altogether. To address these concerns, the Established Programs Financing Act was passed in 1977, transferring the responsibility of the program to the provinces by decoupling the amount of the federal transfer from the provisions. Some provinces levied user charges and authorized extra-billing, which threatened universal and free access to healthcare. In response, the federal government enacted the Canada Health Act in 1984 to re-instate the principles of the HIDS Act and also the Medical Care Act. Those Acts were then repealed.

== See also ==
=== Related links ===
- Established Programs Financing
- Canada Health Act
- Medical Care Act

=== Bibliography ===
- Hospital Insurance and Diagnostic Services Act, S.C. 1957, c. 28
- An Act to amend the Hospital Insurance and Diagnostic Services Act, S.C. 1958, c. 6
- Hospital Insurance and Diagnostic Services Act, R.S.C. 1970, c. H-8
