= User fee =

A user fee is a fee, tax, or impost payment paid to a facility owner or operator by a facility user as a necessary condition for using the facility.

People pay user fees for the use of many public services and facilities. At the federal level in the United States, there is a charge for walking to the top of the Statue of Liberty, to drive into many national parks, and to use particular services of the Library of Congress.

States may charge tolls for driving on highways or impose a fee on those who camp in state parks. Communities usually have entrance fees for public swimming pools and meters for parking on local streets as well as perhaps even parking spaces at public beaches, dump stickers and postage stamps. In the United States, the Highway Trust Fund is supported by per-gallon taxes on fuel, acting as a user fee where those who drive more (and thus use more fuel) pay proportionally more for transportation infrastructure. State fuel taxes have a similar user-fee model, including pilot programs that shift from a per-gallon fee to one based upon distance.

In international development, user fees refer to a system fee for basic health care, education, or other services implemented by a developing country to make up for the costs of these services.

The International Monetary Fund often recommends that nations start charging fees for these services in order to reduce their budget deficits. This position is more and more challenged by many people who claim that user fees hurt the poorest the most. Some even argue that they should be free at the point of use.

The alternative to funding facilities and services with user fees is to fund them with broad-based taxes on income, sales, or property. Unlike user fees, taxes are paid by a much larger percentage of the population, including those who don't necessarily use or benefit from a specific facility or service.
