= Health Council of Canada =

- Founded: 2003-2014
- Type: Nonprofit organization
- Purpose: Health, Health Care System, Medicare (Canada)
- Location: Toronto, Ontario, Canada
- Key people: Council Chair, Dr. Jack Kitts; Health Council of Canada CEO, John G. Abbott; Health Council of Canada COO, Kathryn MacDonald
- Website: healthcouncilcanada.ca

The Health Council of Canada was a national, independent, public reporting agency based in Toronto, Ontario, Canada. Announced as part of the 2003 First Ministers' Accord on Health Care Renewal with a mandate to report publicly to Canadians, the Health Council provided a system-wide perspective on health care reform related to the 2003 Accord’s policy and program commitments as well as those contained in the 2004 10-Year Plan to Strengthen Health Care. In 2010, the Health Council’s mandate was expanded to include the nationwide dissemination of information on best practices and innovation in health care.

== History ==
Created in 2003, the Health Council of Canada produced more than 60 reports on a variety of health care themes, such as Aboriginal health, access and wait times, health promotion, health system performance, home and community care, pharmaceuticals management, and primary health care.

The work of the Health Council of Canada was funded by Health Canada, overseen by 13 independent councillors and one ex-officio councillor appointed by the federal, provincial, and territorial governments (excluding the Government of Quebec), and supported by a professional secretariat based in Toronto.

In addition to its reports, the Health Council of Canada assessed and highlighted innovations that were contributing to a higher-quality health care system in a searchable database called the Health Innovation Portal. Launched in November 2012, the portal featured practices, policies, programs and services that could be scaled up or adopted elsewhere in Canada, ideally to improve health outcomes in the most cost-effective manner possible. Notable features of the portal included a searchable database with more than 400 innovative practices covering a range of health care themes, a user-friendly search function, and customizable outputs for health policy researchers.

The Health Council also hosted national symposia, roundtables and town halls on critical health care topics such as system sustainability, health human resources, integrated care, patient engagement, and quality improvement. It continually engaged key stakeholders on important health policy issues in its work, online and through its social media channels. The Health Council was also an active contributor to the online Evidence Network for health care journalists and researchers as well as McMaster University’s Evidence-Informed Healthcare Renewal (EIHR) portal.

In April 2013, the federal government announced that its funding for the Health Council of Canada would end after March 2014. According to the federal government, with the end of the accords in 2014, the Health Council had completed its mandate.

In September 2013, an independent evaluation conducted by KPMG found that "the Health Council is the top [Canadian] organization that comes to mind among its key audiences when it comes to seeking information on both health system performance and innovative practices in health care." The Health Council of Canada’s work will still be available online. Content from the Health Innovation Portal has been transferred to Accreditation Canada’s leading practices database, and the Health Council’s website is archived online.

== Select publications ==
HCC publications include "Better health, better care, better value for all: Refocusing health care reform in Canada", Progress reports, the Canadian Health Care Matters series, Aboriginal health reports, "Seniors in need, caregivers in distress: What are the home care priorities for seniors in Canada?" and "Innovative Practices Evaluation Framework."
