= Bibliography of Brian Mulroney =

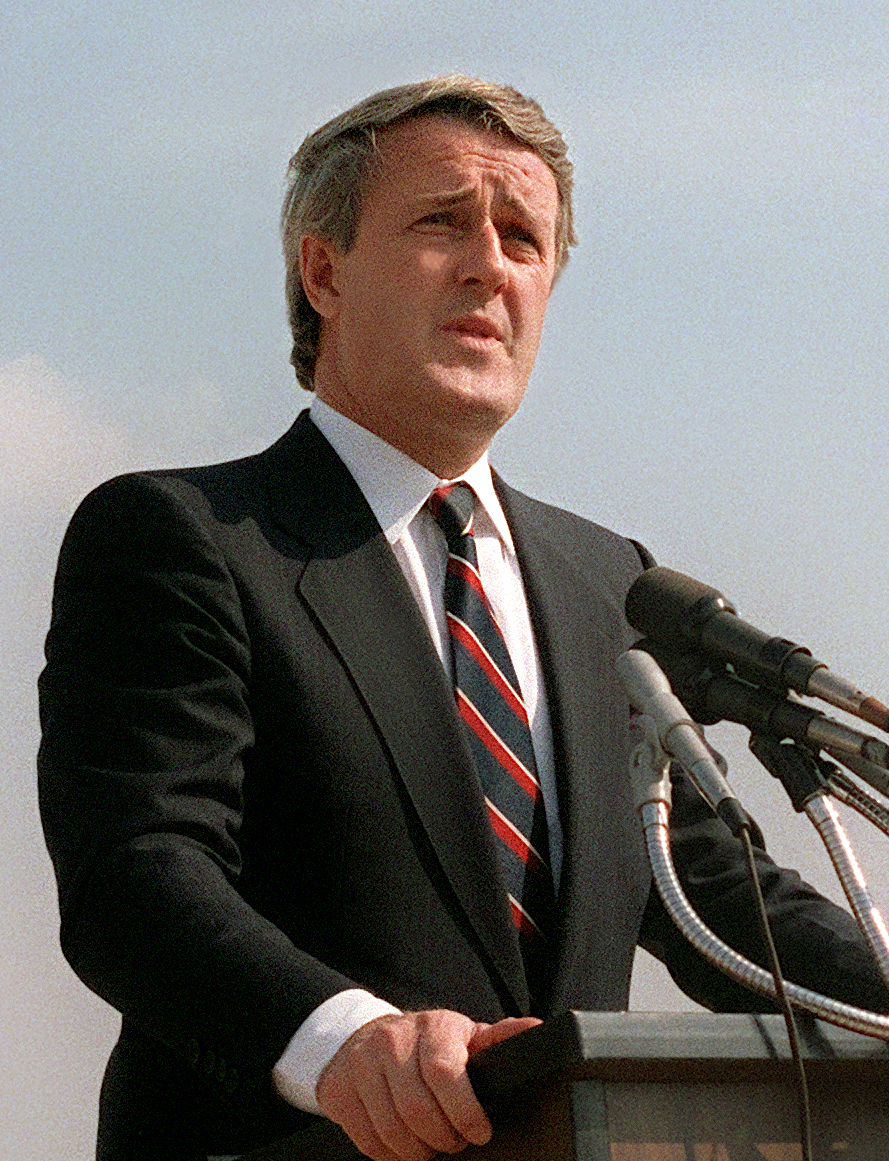
Mulroney in 1984

Brian Mulroney was a Canadian lawyer, businessman, and politician who served as the 18th prime minister of Canada from 1984 to 1993. He was the author of two books: Where I Stand (1983) and Memoirs: 1939-1993 (2007), both published by McClelland & Stewart.

Mulroney has been the subject of a variety of literary works. This bibliography includes written and published works examining Mulroney's political career and policies, limited to non-fiction books specifically discussing Mulroney and his time as prime minister from notable authors and publishers. Tertiary sources, satire, and self-published literature are excluded.

== Books by Mulroney ==
List of written and published works by Brian Mulroney
Book title	Year	Publisher	Identifiers	Notes
Where I Stand	1983	McClelland & Stewart	ISBN 978-0-7710-6671-9; OCLC 10196788	
Memoirs: 1939–1993	2007	McClelland & Stewart	ISBN 978-0-7710-6536-1; OCLC 86225969	

== Books about Mulroney ==
List of written and published works about Brian Mulroney
Author(s)	Book title	Year	Publisher	Identifiers	Notes
Patrick Brown, Rae Murphy, Robert Chodos	Winners, Losers: The 1976 Tory Leadership Convention	1976	James Lorimer & Company	ISBN 978-0-8886-2105-4; OCLC 2524393	
Nick Auf der Maur, Rae Murphy, Robert Chodos	Brian Mulroney: The Boy from Baie Comeau	1984	James Lorimer & Company	ISBN 978-0-8886-2693-6; OCLC 12217109	
L. Ian MacDonald	Mulroney: The Making of the Prime Minister	1984	McClelland & Stewart	ISBN 978-0-7710-5469-3; OCLC 11973348	
David Bercuson, J. L. Granatstein, W. R. Young	Sacred Trust? Brian Mulroney and the Conservative Party in Power	1986	Doubleday Canada	ISBN 978-0-3852-5060-3; OCLC 14903849	
John Sawatsky	The Insiders: Government, Business, and the Lobbyists	1987	McClelland & Stewart	ISBN 978-0-7710-7949-8; OCLC 18984652	
Claire Hoy	Friends in High Places: Politics and Patronage in the Mulroney Government	1987	Key Porter Books	ISBN 978-1-5501-3047-8; OCLC 18052925	
Eric Hamovitch, Rae Murphy, Robert Chodos	Selling Out: Four Years of the Mulroney Government	1988	James Lorimer & Company	ISBN 978-1-5502-8101-9; OCLC 19975863	
Linda McQuaig	The Quick and the Dead: Brian Mulroney, Big Business and the Seduction of Canada	1991	Penguin Books	ISBN 978-0-1401-3292-2; OCLC 24377661	
John Sawatsky	Mulroney: The Politics of Ambition	1991	Macfarlane Walter & Ross	ISBN 978-0-9219-1206-4; OCLC 25965485	
Stevie Cameron	On the Take: Crime, Corruption and Greed in the Mulroney Years	1994	Macfarlane Walter & Ross	ISBN 978-0-9219-1273-6; OCLC 31290084	
William Kaplan	Presumed Guilty: Brian Mulroney, the Airbus Affair, and the Government of Canada	1998	McClelland & Stewart	ISBN 978-0-7710-4454-0; OCLC 39381142	
William Kaplan	A Secret Trial: Brian Mulroney, Stevie Cameron, and the Public Trust	2004	McGill–Queen's University Press	ISBN 978-0-7735-2846-8; OCLC 55973127	
Peter C. Newman	The Secret Mulroney Tapes: Unguarded Confessions of a Prime Minister	2005	Vintage Canada	ISBN 978-0-6793-1352-6; OCLC 67860454	
Raymond B. Blake	Transforming the Nation: Canada and Brian Mulroney	2007	McGill–Queen's University Press	ISBN 978-0-7735-3214-4; OCLC 123127480	
Fen Osler Hampson	Master of Persuasion: Brian Mulroney's Global Legacy	2018	Signal Books	ISBN 978-0-7710-3907-2; OCLC 1033596888	

== See also ==
- List of books about prime ministers of Canada
- Bibliography of Canada
