= 1988 Canadian federal budget =

Michael Wilson and the Mulroney government's fourth national spending plan

1988 Budget of the Canadian Federal Government Securing Economic Renewal
- Presented: 10 February 1988
- Country: Canada
- Parliament: 33rd
- Party: Progressive Conservative
- Finance minister: Michael Wilson
- Deficit: $27.947 billion

The Canadian federal budget for fiscal year 1988–89 was presented to the House of Commons of Canada by finance minister Michael Wilson on 10 February 1988. It was the fourth budget after the 1984 Canadian federal election and would be the last before the 1988 Canadian federal election.

== Taxes ==
=== Personal income taxes ===
Michael Wilson presented an important reform of the tax system in June 1987. As a result, the budget 1988 did not bring forward important changes to the tax system with a few exceptions:

- Increase in Child Benefits: after the Minister of National Health and Welfare presented a new policy on child care, the budget provides for a doubling of deductible child care expenses (from $2,000 to $4,000 per year for each eligible child) and repealed the overall maximum deduction limit of $8,000 per year. The Refundable Child Tax Credit is increased by a supplement of $100 in the 1988 tax year and another $100 in the 1989 tax year for low and middle-income families. That supplement is however reduced by 25% of the aforementioned child care expenses deduction;
- National Labour-Sponsored Venture Capital Tax Credit : the tax credit previously introduced in the 1985 budget is extended :
  - Prior to the budget, only shares which benefited from a provincial tax credit could qualify for the federal tax credit;
  - Starting in 1988 the provincial tax credit criterion is repealed.
  - The cap on cumulative federal and provincial tax credits is however maintained at 40% of the cost of the shares or $700, whichever is the lesser.

=== Corporate income taxes ===
The budget included changes of rules for associated corporations with a clarification of the definition of associated corporations to prevent multiple use of the small business deduction.

=== Other taxes ===
==== Excise taxes ====
Excise taxes on gasoline and aviation gasoline is increased by $0.01 per litre. The measure was projected to yield $300 million in yearly revenues.

== Expenditures ==
The budget provides for a reduction of $300 million in non-statutory spending for 1989–1990 to keep the deficit in line with the projections made in the June 1987 White Paper on tax reform. These reductions do not affect social programs and transfers to provinces and explicitly excludes Official Development Assistance (i.e. international aid) and the Department of National Defence.

== Reactions ==
=== Opposition ===
Ed Broadbent, leader of the New Democratic Party joked that the budget was a gift for opposition parties. Broadbent and John Turner, the leader of the Opposition, strongly criticized the increase in gasoline excise tax and the general fiscal policy of the Mulroney government. The NPD leader decried a policy that only benefits high-earners and raises taxes for the middle class and joked that “the only good thing about this budget is that it's almost certain to be the last Conservative budget.”

The finance critic and Quebec lieutenant of the Liberal Party, Raymond Garneau blasted the budget as a “a Canada for the rich, but not a Canada for the average Canadian, not a Canada for the poor” pointing that Mr. Wilson increased taxes by $22 billion since 1984.

=== Provinces ===
Quebec's finance minister, Gérard D. Levesque declared he was disappointed that the federal government did not reduce its deficit faster and added that deficit reduction should have been the priority of a budget that was more a track record than a budget. Lastly, the minister expressed his disappointment towards the lack of measures to help families or Quebec's economic development whereas Alberta, Northern Ontario and the Atlantic provinces benefited from significant measures.

== Aftermath ==
=== Execution ===
Budgetary items in billions of dollars
Element	1987-1988	1988-1989	
Element	Actual	Budget	Actual
Tax revenues	79.87	103.30	90.74
Non-tax revenues	5.92	103.30	6.71
Program expenditures	(89.73)	(132.3)	(96.51)
Public debt charge	(26.66)	(132.3)	(29.03)
Deficit	(30.61)	(28.90)	(28.08)
Non-budgetary transactions	9.04	6.60	9.93
Financial requirements	(21.57)	(22.30)	(18.15)

== Notes and references ==
=== Official documents ===
- Budget documents:
  - Department of Finance (10 February 1988). Budget Papers: Securing Economic Renewal (PDF). Ottawa: Government of Canada.
  - Department of Finance (10 February 1988). The Budget Speech (PDF). Ottawa: Government of Canada.
- Other documents:
  - Department of Finance (18 June 1987). Tax reform 1987, income tax reform (PDF). Ottawa: Government of Canada.

=== Enacted legislations ===
- An Act to amend the Income Tax Act, the Canada Pension Plan, the Unemployment Insurance Act, 1971, the Federal-Provincial Fiscal Arrangements and Federal Post-Secondary Education and Health Contributions Act, 1977 and certain related Acts, S.C. 1988, c. 55
