= Patrick MacAdam =

Canadian writer and political insider

Patrick "Pat" MacAdam (15 September 1934 – 19 May 2015) was a Canadian writer and longtime Conservative Party insider born in Glace Bay, Nova Scotia. He died in Ottawa on 19 May 2015 after a years long battle with cancer.

== Early and political life ==
MacAdam attended St. Francis Xavier University, in Antigonish, Nova Scotia from 1952 until 1956. He served as the editor-in-chief of the student newspaper The Xaverian Weekly in 1955, the same year he met longtime friend Brian Mulroney when Mulroney was a freshman and MacAdam was a senior.

MacAdam would serve as a political advisor to Mulroney during his term as Prime Minister of Canada, taking a job at the High Commission of Canada in London. After Mulroney's term ended in 1993, MacAdam was accused of tax evasion, and eventually convicted in 1997.

== Writing ==
In addition to a weekly column in the Ottawa Sun, MacAdam wrote several books:

- The record speaks! (1961)
- Unbelievable Canadian War Stories (2006)
- "Big Cy" and Other Characters: Pat MacAdam's Cape Breton (2006), nominated for a Stephen Leacock Award in 2007.
- Gold Medal Misfits (2007)
- Mulroney's Man: Memoirs and Misadventures of an Ottawa Insider (2008)
