= The Secret Mulroney Tapes =

2005 biography of Brian Mulroney by Peter C. Newman

- Author: Peter C. Newman
- Genre: Biography
- Publisher: Random House Canada
- Publication date: August 15, 2006
- Pages: 480
- ISBN: 9780679313526

The Secret Mulroney Tapes: Unguarded Confessions of a Prime Minister is a biography of former Prime Minister of Canada Brian Mulroney, by writer and former Mulroney confidant Peter C. Newman.

The book was released by Random House Canada on September 12, 2005.

== Content and controversies of the book ==
The book is based on hours of taped interviews, amounting to more than 7400 pages of transcripts, with Mulroney himself, family, friends, colleagues and contemporaries.

In the book, Mulroney opens up his darkest secrets and his innermost thoughts. In the interviews, he proclaimed himself the greatest prime minister since John A. Macdonald, and claimed that Pierre Trudeau opposed the Meech Lake Accord to try to destroy him. Mulroney claims that "Trudeau's contribution was not to build Canada but to destroy it, and I had to come in to save it."

Mulroney describes his successor Kim Campbell as a "very vain person who blew the 1993 election because she was too busy screwing around with her Russian boyfriend" (Gregory Lekhtman), resulting in "the most incompetent campaign I've seen in my life."

Campbell responded to the news by saying that Mulroney just wanted a "scapegoat who would bear the burden of his unpopularity".

== Mulroney's reaction ==
Via a spokesman, Mulroney said he was "devastated" and "betrayed" by Newman. He went further, saying "I was reckless in talking with Peter C. Newman... This was my mistake and I'm going to have to live with it." Mulroney also said that most of the time he was not aware that his conversations were being recorded. Lawyer Julian Porter rebuts this claim, however:

"Senator Pat Carney also disputed comments made by Mr. Mulroney’s spokesman, Luc Lavoie, on Monday that many of the remarks were made in late-night conversations and the former prime minister was unaware he was being taped. Mr. Lavoie told reporters Mr. Mulroney felt betrayed by Mr. Newman. 'He told his colleagues he was doing the taping with Peter Newman,' Senator Carney said yesterday. 'We were all aware. We may have thought he was crazy, but we were all aware.' This view (Mulroney's) is disputed by Newman, who claims that an agreement was struck between the two men in 1976, shortly before Mulroney's first run at the leadership of the Progressive Conservative party. Newman claims that Mulroney agreed to grant him privileged access on a regular basis should Mulroney become Prime Minister. According to Newman, Mulroney wanted someone to write a definitive history of his time as Prime Minister, warts and all. 'I don't want a puff job,' Mulroney allegedly told Newman. Newman writes that he didn't get one, and that the only pre-condition was that any book (based on the interviews) be published after Mulroney left office, which happened in early 1993. The original agreement allegedly also included a provision granting Newman access to documents from the Mulroney period -- some of them cabinet confidences -- in order to round out the book and provide historical evidence and perspective to Mulroney's taped words. In 1995, Newman writes that Mulroney changed the terms of the agreement and denied access to the documents."

Newman now says this wasn't the book he wanted to write, but that he was prevented from writing an unbiased historical look at Mulroney's term in office because he wasn't given everything that he was originally promised. Unwilling to let the tapes sit unused, Newman instead wrote this book, which was released September 12, 2005. There has been speculation that the reason behind Mulroney's alleged decision not to grant access to the documents originally promised was that he was planning to release his own memoirs, which were published on September 10, 2007, under the title Memoirs: 1939–1993. It has been suggested by some media outlets that Newman released his book before Mulroney could get his own edited and sanitized version of events out.

After the publication of the book, Jean Charest, a former Cabinet minister under Mulroney and former premier of Quebec, came to his defence in a press conference, saying that he agreed with the statement that "Nobody has achievements like this ... you cannot name a Canadian prime minister who has done as many significant things as I did, because there are none." Charest noted that Mulroney was the father of Free Trade and argues that the GST was a good thing for the Canadian economy.

Newman has pledged to make the tapes available publicly at a later date. The original tapes are now located in a special collections archive at the University of Toronto, where Newman says they will remain safe for future historians.

== CBC special ==
On November 21, 2005, the Canadian Broadcasting Corporation broadcast a two-hour feature documentary based on the tapes. In the documentary, select excerpts from the tapes were intercut between commentary from Newman. The biggest difference between the documentary and the book was the documentary's inclusion of Peter Newman's voice from the audio tapes. Rarely seen archival news footage of Mulroney formed the bulk of the visuals for this program. This program was produced and directed by Mike Sheerin, who had previously been nominated for a Gemini Award for making the Life and Times of Peter C. Newman. After the documentary aired, the book was listed as the #5 bestselling non-fiction book in Canada according to Maclean's, whereas the previous week it had been #7.

== Mulroney lawsuit ==
On November 23, 2005, Mulroney filed a lawsuit against Newman, arguing that Newman had broken the terms of the deal about how the tapes should be used, as well as what would happen to them if Newman did not produce the "scholarly and serious" biography of him that Mulroney expected.

The suit had three main demands:

- Newman ceases any future plans to print or broadcast the tapes, with the court imposing a permanent injunction to ensure he doesn't.
- Any money Newman has already made from the tapes is to be donated to two hospitals in Toronto and Montreal.
- The tapes are to be turned over to Library and Archives Canada.

Prior to this, on November 17, 2005, Mulroney's friend, scandal-ridden former media lord Conrad Black, filed a libel suit against Newman for "falsely and maliciously accusing him of breaking criminal laws, including mail and wire fraud and money laundering in his 2004 book about Black." It is notable that these are the same charges that Black faced in the United States in 2007, some of which he was convicted on.

On December 5, 2005, Mulroney accepted an honorary Doctor of Laws degree from Concordia University. During the speech, he joked that he would be brief because he could only speak at length when he was being recorded, making a passing joke about the tapes.
