= 1985 Canadian federal budget =

Michael Wilson and the Mulroney government's first national spending plan

1985 Budget of the Canadian Federal Government
- Presented: 23 May 1985
- Country: Canada
- Parliament: 33rd
- Party: Progressive Conservative
- Finance minister: Michael Wilson
- Total revenue: 77.742 billion
- Total expenditures: 111.131 billion
- Deficit: $33.389 billion

The 1985 Canadian federal budget for fiscal year 1985–86 was presented by Minister of Finance Michael Wilson in the House of Commons of Canada on 23 May 1985. This is the first federal budget under the premiership of Brian Mulroney, and generally increased taxes.

== Background ==
The budget is the first presented in the 33rd Canadian Parliament, following the 1984 federal election during which the Progressive Conservatives won a landslide majority. The previous fiscal year (1983–84) saw, at the time, the largest post-war deficit of the federal government at 37.16 billion.

=== November 1984 Statement ===
Prior to the 1985 Budget, Michael Wilson delivered an Economic Statement in the House of Commons on 8 November 1984. The Economic Statement announced a $4.2 billion deficit reduction package for 1985-86. The package included for instance:

- Reduction of the size of the federal public service;
- Pay cuts for the Prime Minister (15%) and Cabinet ministers (10%) on 1 January 1985.

The Statement also announced amendments to the Foreign Investment Review Act to facilitate foreign investments into Canada, and tabled documents to implement tax announcements made in prior budgets that had not yet been implemented through legislation. Notably the 1% rate increase in the federal sales tax on 1 October 1984 is confirmed.

The Statement announced that the personal exemptions were to be indexed by 4.6% for 1985.

Despite the measures announced, the deficit for 1985-86 was estimated at $34.9 billion, versus the estimate of the February 1984 budget of a $27.9 billion deficit for the same period.

== Taxes ==
We're asking that Canadians pay 1$ more per day in taxes to make a better world

— Micheal Wilson, 1985 Budget speech

=== Personal income taxes ===
The budget brought significant changes to income taxes, notably:

- Introduced the Lifetime Capital Gains Exemption (LCGE)
  - The budget provided for a $500,000 exemption lifetime exemption for capital gains (Note: The exemption is phased-in at $20,000 in 1985, $50,000 in 1986, $100,000 in 1987, $200,000 in 1988, $300,000 in 1989 and finally $500,000 in 1990 and thereafter.) to encourage investment and risk-taking.
  - To account for the LCGE several other tax incentives were abolished or rolled back (Note: For instance: Indexed Security Investment Plans were repealed starting 1 January 1986; Capital gains no longer qualify for the $1,000 investment deduction; Transfer of farm capital gains to RRSPs is repealed as of 24 May 1985.)
- A new tax credit of up to 20% (Note: The credit is computer as the lesser of: 20% of the cost of the shares acquired or; 40% of the cost of the share minus the benefit provided by the provincial government.) is allowed for investments in Labour-Sponsored Venture Capital Funds (LSVCF) with the following limitations:
  - The federal credit is capped at $700 by year.
  - The credit is conditional upon the province of the taxpayer providing at least a 20% tax credit.
- Repealed the Registered home ownership savings plan (RHOSP) that was created in 1974.
  - Starting the day after budget day, RHOSP contributions would not be deductible and no contribution can be made after 31 December 1985. (Note: They would otherwise by reincluded in the taxpayer's income if made between 22 May 1985 and 31 December 1985.)
  - Funds left in RHOSP after 22 May 1985 could be withdrawn tax-free. Income earned in a RHOSP after 31 December 1985 was to be included in the owner's taxable income, effectively ending the last desirable feature of RHOSPs.

Several revenue increase measures were also announced:

- Full tax indexation is dropped starting in 1986 and replaced with a partial indexation whereby tax brackets and the basic exemption are indexed on the CPI increase in excess of 3%. No indexation is to take place if CPI is below 3%.
- A temporary 5% surtax is implemented on federal tax between $6,000 and $15,000 and 10% on tax in excess of $15,000. The temporary surtax was slated to last between 1 July 1985 (Note: The effective surtax rate in 1985 is 2.5% for income between $6,000 and $15,000 and 5% for income above that threshold.)and 31 December 1986.
- The federal tax reduction is repealed starting in 1986.

=== Corporate income taxes ===
A temporary 5% surtax on large corporations was announced, effective between 1 July 1985 and 30 June 1986. The surtax does not apply to income eligible to the small business deduction.

=== Capital tax ===
A temporary 1% surtax on the capital tax payable by large financial institutions effective between 1 January 1986 and 31 December 1987. The surtax is calculated as 1% of capital in excess of $200 million. The surtax was deductible for corporate income taxes

=== Other taxes ===
==== Federal Sales Tax ====
The Federal Sales Tax rates are increased on 1 January 1986:

- From 6 to 7% for construction goods, cable and television services;
- From 13 to 14% for alcoholic beverages and tobacco;
- From 10 to 11% for all other taxable goods.

The previous 1% temporary increase, slated to end on 31 December 1988, is permanently extended.

The federal sales tax exemption is repealed for the following goods:

- Candy and confectionery, soft drinks;
- Pet food;
- Hygiene products (soaps, shampoos, creams...) excluding feminine hygiene and contraceptives;
- Surgical and dental instruments;
- Wood-burning stoves, heat pumps, solar heaters and similar goods.

==== Excise taxes ====
Various excise taxes were increased in the budget:

- Tax on gasoline is increased by $0.02 per litre starting on 3 September 1985, to avoid the increase affect the summer vacation season;
- Automatic indexation of excise taxes on alcohol and tobacco is dropped however:
  - Excise tax on alcoholic beverages is increased by 2%;
  - Excise tax on tobacco is increased by 1%.

==== Energy taxes: Western Accord implementation ====
The budget follows the signature of the Western Accord between the federal government and the governments of Alberta, British Columbia and Saskatchewan that was slated to enter into force on 1 June 1985. The budget introduced measures to implement the Accord, notably:

- Phased-out repeal of the Petroleum and Gas Revenue Tax (PGRT) between 1 January 1986 and 31 December 1988;
- Retroactive repeal of the Incremental Oil Revenue Tax (IORT) for production after 31 December 1984;
- The Canadian Ownership Special Charge (COSC) is suspended by regulation starting on 1 June 1985. The legislative measures and the Canadian Ownership Account special fund to be deleted at a later date;
- Amendments to the Excise Tax Act to repeal the sections related to the Natural Gas and Gas Liquids Tax (NGGLT); (Note: The NGGLT rate was set at 0% since 1 February 1984.)
- The oil export charge created on 1 October 1973 is repealed.

== Expenditures ==
The newly-elected government had already established a Ministerial Task Force on Program Review headed by Deputy Prime Minister Erik Nielsen in September 1984. In the November 1984 Economic Statement the Minister of Finance had announced $4.2 billion of expenditure cuts for fiscal year 1985-86 through various measures:

- A reduction of 2% of the number of jobs in 1986-87 in the federal government and a further 1% for each of the following four years;
- The repeal of the automatic indexation of departmental budgets;
- A new cash management strategy to better use surplus cash balances in Crown corporations;
- A new real properties management strategy to better monetize federal assets;
- Cost recovery initiatives to use user-payer principles in the delivery of federal services and goods.

=== Transfer Programs ===
==== Partial indexation of Transfers to Individuals ====
The major initiative of the budget on the expenditure side was the partial deindexation of most major transfer programs beginning 1 January 1986:

- If the CPI increase for the year was above 3% the indexation rate would be equal to the CPI increase minus 3%;
- The indexation would be 0% if CPI increase was below 3%.

Most major programs (notably Old Age Security and Family Allowances) were subjected to the new partial indexation rule whereas the Guaranteed Income Supplement and veterans' benefits remained fully indexed to CPI.

==== Cuts to Transfers to Provinces ====
The government announced a cap to the growth of the Established Programs Financing fiscal arrangements until FY1990-91, saving the federal government $2 billion over the period.

== Reactions ==
The budget garnered generally mixed reaction.

=== Editorials ===
On 24 May 1985, several newspapers' main headline focused on the tax increases:

- La Presse : “Wilson Taxes Everywhere”;
- The Globe and Mail : “Ottawa increases the tax load”;
- The Gazette : “Taxes up, up, up as budget hits ordinary Canadians hard”

Columnist Alain Dubuc of La Presse pointed out that the budget was disappointing in that it did not drastically reduce the federal deficit while containing few measures for job creation and several tax increases. Most French-language columnists pointed out the uncertainty over the success of the measures announced in the budget.

Jeffrey Simpson of The Globe and Mail painted a nuanced picture of the budget pointing overall that the return to “fiscal sanity” was long overdue. L. Ian MacDonald of The Gazette expressed that the budget was a risky gamble, increasing taxes on the middle class and providing tax incentives to businesses could provide politically explosive should the recovery not materialize.

=== Opposition ===
The Opposition Parties strongly rejected the budget:

- Don Johnston (Liberal MP for Saint-Henri—Westmount) described it as "one of the worst Budgets that has ever been presented to the House of Commons";
- John Turner (Liberal Leader of the Opposition) called it an "attack on the elderly, the poor and the middle class".

=== Unions ===
Union response was favorable to fiercely negative:

- Employer organizations generally applauded the deficit reductions initiatives and the jobs incentives announcements;
- Trade unions criticized the inequalities of the efforts contained in the budget.

=== Provinces ===
Quebec Finance Minister Yves Duhaime pointed the budget embraced "tragic realism", applauded the incentives for job creations provided to SMEs but criticized the cuts to the transfers to provinces.

The National Assembly of Quebec passed a unanimous motion criticizing the deindexation of Old Age Security.

The budget garnered a very positive reaction from former Quebec finance minister Jacques Parizeau. He applauded the courage of the deindexation and the repeal of the RHOSP as a way to inject $2 billion into the economy.

== Aftermath ==
=== June 27 Ministerial Statement ===
On June 27, following weeks of protests by elderly Canadians, the Minister of Finance rose in the House of Commons to announce he would reinstate the full indexation of the Old Age Security program:

We have met with many senior citizens. We have listened carefully to their views on this matter. I know I speak for all my Cabinet and caucus colleagues when I say that we have been impressed by the concerns they have expressed. [...] Therefore, I am announcing today that Old Age Security payments will remain fully indexed to the Consumer Price Index.

— Michael Wilson, Minister of Finance

To compensate the additional costs incurred by the full indexation, he announced that:

- The deficit-reduction surtax affecting large corporations was to be extended by 6 months;
- Excise taxes on gasoline were to be increased by an additional $0.01/litre starting 1 January 1987.

=== Legislative history ===
The budget was implemented through multiple bills over the years following the budget:

- Changes to income taxes were legislated through Bill C-84 which was read a third time and adopted by the House of Commons on 21 January 1986 in a 146–47 vote and received royal assent on 13 February 1986.
- Changes to the federal sales tax, excise taxes and the implementation of the Western Accord were legislated through Bill C-80 who received royal assent on 4 March 1986.
- Cuts to transfers to province were legislated through Bill C-96 which was read a third time and adopted by the House of Commons on 19 June 1986 in a 90–22 vote and received royal assent on 27 June 1986.

=== Execution ===
Budgetary items in billions of dollars
Element	1984-1985	1985-1986	
Element	Actual	Budget	Actual
Tax revenues	65.49		71.61
Non-tax revenues	5.40		5.22
Program expenditures	(86.76)		(85.79)
Public debt charge	(22.46)		(25.44)
Deficit	(38.32)		(34.40)
Non-budgetary transactions	8.52		4.13
Financial requirements	(29.80)		(30.27)

== Notes and References ==
=== References ===
==== Budget documents ====
- Budget Papers 1985 – Supplementary Information and Notices of Ways and Means Motions on the Budget (PDF). Ottawa. 23 May 1985.
- Budget Speech
- Budget in Brief

==== Enacted legislations ====
- An Act to amend the Income Tax Act and related statutes, and to amend the Canada Pension Plan, the Unemployment Insurance Act, 1971, the Financial Administration Act and the Petroleum and Gas Revenue Tax Act, S.C. 1986, c. 6
- An Act to amend the Excise Tax Act and the Excise Act and to amend other Acts in consequence thereof, S.C. 1986, c. 9
