= Brian Mulroney =

Prime Minister of Canada from 1984 to 1993

The Right Honourable Brian Mulroney PC CC GOQ
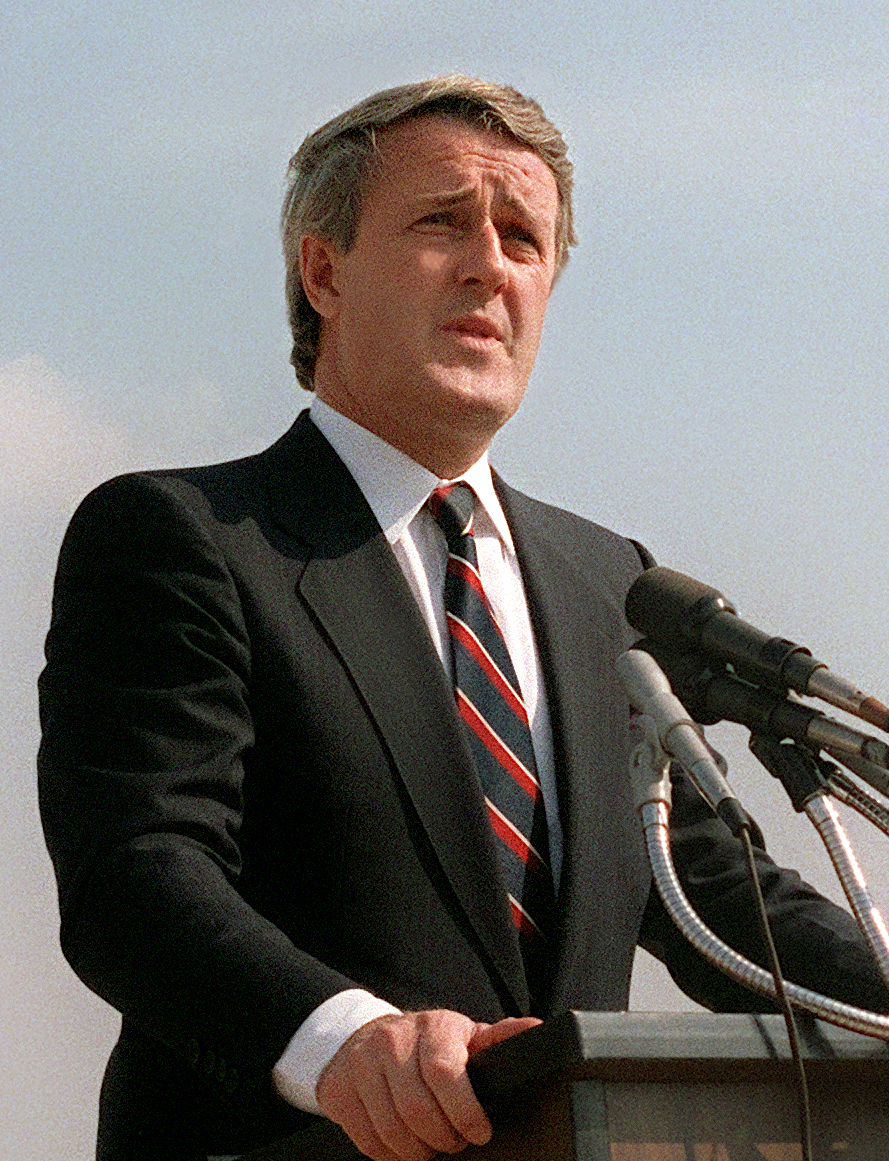
- Mulroney in 1984

18th Prime Minister of Canada
- In office September 17, 1984 – June 25, 1993
- Monarch: Elizabeth II
- Governors General: Jeanne Sauvé; Ray Hnatyshyn
- Deputy: Erik Nielsen; Don Mazankowski
- Preceded by: John Turner
- Succeeded by: Kim Campbell

Leader of the Opposition
- In office August 29, 1983 – September 17, 1984
- Monarch: Elizabeth II
- Prime Minister: Pierre Trudeau; John Turner
- Preceded by: Erik Nielsen
- Succeeded by: John Turner

Leader of the Progressive Conservative Party
- In office June 11, 1983 – June 13, 1993
- Preceded by: Joe Clark (Note: Erik Nielsen acted from February 19 to June 11, 1983)
- Succeeded by: Kim Campbell
Member of Parliament constituencies
In office November 21, 1988 – October 25, 1993
Preceded by	Charles-André Hamelin
Succeeded by	Gérard Asselin
Constituency	Charlevoix
In office September 4, 1984 – November 21, 1988
Preceded by	André Maltais
Succeeded by	Charles Langlois
Constituency	Manicouagan
In office August 29, 1983 – September 4, 1984
Preceded by	Elmer MacKay
Succeeded by	Elmer MacKay
Constituency	Central Nova

Personal details
- Born: Martin Brian Mulroney; March 20, 1939 Baie-Comeau, Quebec, Canada
- Died: February 29, 2024 (aged 84) Palm Beach, Florida, U.S.
- Resting place: Notre Dame des Neiges Cemetery, Montreal, Quebec
- Party: Progressive Conservative (1955–2003); Conservative (from 2003)
- Spouse: Mila Pivnički (m. 1973)
- Children: 4, including Caroline and Ben
- Relatives: Jessica Mulroney (daughter-in-law)
- Education: St. Francis Xavier University (BA); Université Laval (LLB)
- Brian Mulroney's voice Mulroney on the concerns of the Gulf Crisis; Recorded August 9, 1990

Martin Brian Mulroney (Note: PC CC GOQ (/mʊlˈruːni/ muul-ROO-nee)) (March 20, 1939 – February 29, 2024) was a Canadian lawyer, businessman, and politician who served as the 18th prime minister of Canada from 1984 to 1993. He led the Progressive Conservative Party of Canada and served as a member of Parliament (MP) from 1983 to 1993.

Born in the eastern Quebec city of Baie-Comeau, Mulroney studied political science and law. He then moved to Montreal and gained prominence as a labour lawyer. He ran for leader of the Progressive Conservative Party in 1976, placing third. He was appointed as president of the Iron Ore Company of Canada in 1977. In 1983, Mulroney defeated former prime minister Joe Clark to become leader of the Progressive Conservatives. Mulroney led the party to a landslide victory in the 1984 federal election, winning the second-largest percentage of seats in Canadian history—at 74.8%—and receiving over 50% of the popular vote. He led the party to a second majority government in the 1988 federal election.

Mulroney's tenure as prime minister was marked by the introduction of major economic reforms, such as the Canada–United States Free Trade Agreement, later expanded through the North American Free Trade Agreement (NAFTA); the goods and services tax (GST), which replaced the manufacturers' sales tax; and the privatization of 23 of Canada's 61 Crown corporations, including Air Canada and Petro-Canada. Mulroney attempted to secure Quebec's support of the Constitution Act, 1982 by introducing the Meech Lake Accord and later the Charlottetown Accord. Both proposed recognizing Quebec as a distinct society, extending provincial powers, and extensively changing the Canadian constitution; however, the accords failed to be ratified, with the Meech Lake Accord's demise reviving Quebec separatism and leading to the formation of the Bloc Québécois. Mulroney also faced criticism for his response to the Air India Flight 182 bombing, the largest mass killing in Canadian history. In 1993, his government signed the Nunavut Land Claims Agreement, leading to the creation of the territory of Nunavut. In foreign policy, Mulroney's government strengthened Canada's ties with the United States, ordered military intervention in the Gulf War, and played a leading role within the Commonwealth to sanction the apartheid regime in South Africa. On the environment, he signed a treaty with the United States on acid rain, made Canada the first developed country to ratify the Convention on Biological Diversity, added eight national parks, and passed the original Environmental Protection Act and Environmental Assessment Act.

The unpopularity of the GST and the controversy surrounding its passage in the Senate, combined with the early 1990s recession, the prevalence of Canada's chronic budget deficit, the collapse of the Charlottetown Accord, and the rise of the Bloc and the Reform Party (the latter a result of growing Western alienation), caused a stark decline in Mulroney's popularity. He resigned in June 1993 and was succeeded by his cabinet minister Kim Campbell. In the election later that year, the Progressive Conservatives were reduced from a parliamentary caucus of 156 to two, with its support being eroded by the Bloc and Reform parties. In his retirement, Mulroney served as an international business consultant and sat on the board of directors of multiple corporations. He has generally ranked above average in rankings of Canadian prime ministers, but his legacy remains contentious. He was criticized for his role in the resurgence of Quebec nationalism and accused of corruption in the Airbus affair, a scandal which came to light several years after he left office.

== Early life and education ==
Mulroney was born on March 20, 1939, in Baie-Comeau, Quebec, a remote town in the Côte-Nord region of the province. He was the son of Irish Canadian Catholic parents, Mary Irene (née O'Shea) and Benedict Martin Mulroney, who was a paper mill electrician. As there was no English-language Catholic high school in Baie-Comeau, Mulroney completed his high school education at a Roman Catholic boarding school in Chatham, New Brunswick, operated by St. Thomas University. In 2001, St. Thomas University named its newest academic building in his honour. Benedict Mulroney worked overtime and ran a repair business to earn extra money for his children's education, and he encouraged his oldest son to attend university.

Mulroney would frequently tell stories about newspaper publisher Robert R. McCormick, whose company had founded Baie-Comeau. Mulroney would sing Irish songs for McCormick, and the publisher would slip him $50. Mulroney grew up speaking English and French fluently.

=== Family ===
On May 26, 1973, Mulroney married Mila Pivnički, the daughter of a Serbian-Canadian doctor, Dimitrije Pivnički, from Novi Bečej. Many PC campaign buttons featured both Mulroney's and Mila's faces, and Ontario premier Bill Davis commented to Brian, "Mila will get you more votes for you than you will for yourself."

The Mulroneys have four children:

- Caroline Mulroney Lapham (born 1974) – Since 2018, the Member of Provincial Parliament for York—Simcoe and a provincial cabinet minister in the ministry of Doug Ford. Like Mulroney, she contested the Ontario Progressive Conservative Party leadership in 2018 without having previously been an electoral candidate, and placed third on the first ballot behind Ford and runner-up Christine Elliott. Mulroney said that she was the most like him "in her mindset" and that she would have been the most likely to follow in his footsteps into politics.
- Benedict (Ben) Mulroney (born 1976) – A radio and television personality and host of The Ben Mulroney Show on 640 Toronto. From 2016 to 2021, he hosted the CTV morning show Your Morning. He is married to stylist Jessica Mulroney, and their three children served as page boys and bridesmaids during the wedding of Prince Harry and Meghan Markle on May 19, 2018.
- Mark Mulroney (born 1977) – A banking executive. In August 2025, it was announced that he would join CIBC as a global vice chair. His name was mentioned by the press as a potential contender leading up to the 2017 and 2020 federal Conservative leadership contests.
- Nicholas Mulroney (born 1985) – Co-founder of Bond Bakery Brands, an investment platform for independent commercial bakeries.

=== Education ===
Mulroney entered St. Francis Xavier University in the fall of 1955 as a 16-year-old first-year student. His political life began when he was recruited to the campus Progressive Conservative group by Lowell Murray and others early in his first year. Murray, who was appointed to the Senate of Canada in 1979, became Mulroney's close friend, mentor, and adviser. Mulroney made other important, lasting friendships with Gerald Doucet, Fred Doucet, Sam Wakim, and Patrick MacAdam. Mulroney enthusiastically embraced political organization and assisted the local PC candidate in his successful 1956 Nova Scotia provincial election campaign; the PCs, led provincially by Robert Stanfield, won a surprise victory.

Mulroney became a youth delegate and attended the 1956 leadership convention in Ottawa. While initially undecided, Mulroney was captivated by John Diefenbaker's powerful oratory and easy approachability. Mulroney joined the Youth for Diefenbaker committee, which was led by Ted Rogers, a future scion of Canadian business. Mulroney struck up an early friendship with Diefenbaker, who won the leadership, and received telephone calls from him.

Mulroney won several public speaking contests at St. Francis Xavier University, was a star member of the school's debating team, and never lost an interuniversity debate. He was also very active in campus politics, serving with distinction in several model parliaments, and was campus prime minister in a Maritimes-wide Model Parliament in 1958.

Mulroney assisted with the 1958 national election campaign at the local level in Nova Scotia. This campaign led to the largest majority in the history of the Canadian House of Commons. After graduating from St. Francis Xavier with a degree in political science in 1959, Mulroney at first pursued a law degree from Dalhousie Law School in Halifax. It was around this time that Mulroney also cultivated friendships with the Tory premier of Nova Scotia, Robert Stanfield, and his chief adviser Dalton Camp. In his role as an advance man, Mulroney assisted with Stanfield's successful 1960 re-election campaign. Mulroney neglected his studies and became seriously ill during the winter term. He was hospitalized and, despite receiving extensions for several courses because of his illness, left his program at Dalhousie after the first year. He then applied to Université Laval in Quebec City and continued his legal studies there later in 1960.

In Quebec City, Mulroney befriended future Quebec Premier Daniel Johnson Sr. and frequented the provincial legislature, making connections with politicians, aides, and journalists. At Laval, Mulroney built a network of friends, including Lucien Bouchard, Bernard Roy, Michel Cogger, Michael Meighen, and Jean Bazin, that would play a prominent role in Canadian politics for years to come.

Mulroney secured a temporary appointment in Ottawa during the summer of 1962 as executive assistant to Alvin Hamilton, minister of agriculture. Then, a federal election was called. Hamilton took Mulroney with him on the campaign trail, where the young organizer gained valuable experience.

== Labour lawyer (1964–1976) ==
After graduating from Laval in 1964, Mulroney moved to Montreal to join the law firm Howard, Cate, Ogilvy et al. The firm at the time was the largest law firm in the Commonwealth of Nations. Despite twice failing his bar exams, the firm kept him due to his charming personality. Mulroney finally passed the exam and was admitted to the Quebec bar in 1965, after which he began practising as a labour lawyer. He worked on Laurent Picard's Commission of Inquiry on the St. Lawrence Ports. He was noted for ending several strikes along the Montreal waterfront, where he met fellow lawyer W. David Angus of Stikeman Elliott, who would later become a valuable fundraiser for his campaigns. In addition, he met another lawyer at Stikeman Elliott, Stanley Hartt, who later played a vital role assisting him during his political career as Mulroney's chief of staff.

In 1966, Dalton Camp, who by then was president of the Progressive Conservative Party, ran for re-election in what many believed to be a referendum on Diefenbaker's leadership. Diefenbaker had reached his 70th birthday in 1965. Mulroney joined with most of his generation in supporting Camp and opposing Diefenbaker, but due to his past friendship with Diefenbaker, he attempted to stay out of the spotlight. With Camp's narrow victory, Diefenbaker called for a 1967 leadership convention in Toronto. Mulroney joined Joe Clark and others in supporting former justice minister E. Davie Fulton. After Fulton withdrew, Mulroney helped shift most of his organization's support to Robert Stanfield, who won. Mulroney, then 28, would soon become a chief adviser to the new leader in Quebec.

Mulroney's professional reputation was further enhanced when he ended a strike that was considered impossible to resolve at the Montreal newspaper La Presse. In doing so, Mulroney and the paper's owner, Canadian businessman Paul Desmarais, became friends. After his initial difficulties, Mulroney's reputation in his firm steadily increased, and he was made a partner in 1971.

Mulroney gained wider recognition during the Cliche Commission in 1974, which was set up by Quebec premier Robert Bourassa to investigate the situation at the James Bay Project, Canada's largest hydroelectric project. Violence and dirty tactics had broken out as part of a union accreditation struggle. To ensure the commission was non-partisan, Bourassa, the Liberal premier, placed Robert Cliche, a former leader of the provincial New Democratic Party, in charge. Cliche asked Mulroney, a Progressive Conservative and a former student of his, to join the commission. Mulroney asked Lucien Bouchard to join as counsel. The committee's proceedings, which showed Mafia infiltration of the unions, made Mulroney well known in Quebec, as the hearings were extensively covered in the media. The Cliche Commission's report was largely adopted by the Bourassa government. A notable incident included the revelation that the controversy may have involved the office of the premier of Quebec when it emerged that Paul Desrochers, Bourassa's special executive assistant, had met with the union boss André Desjardins, known as the "King of Construction," to ask for his help with winning a by-election in exchange for a guarantee that only companies employing workers from his union would work on the James Bay project. Although Bouchard favoured calling in Robert Bourassa as a witness, Mulroney refused, deeming it a violation of "executive privilege". Mulroney and Bourassa would later cultivate a friendship that would turn out to be extremely beneficial when Mulroney ran for re-election in 1988.

=== 1976 Progressive Conservative leadership election ===
The Stanfield-led Progressive Conservatives lost the 1974 election to the Pierre Trudeau-led Liberals, leading to Stanfield's resignation as leader. Mulroney, despite never having run for elected office, entered the contest to replace him. Mulroney and provincial rival Claude Wagner were both seen as potentially able to improve the party's standing in Quebec, which had supported the federal Liberals for decades. Mulroney had played the lead role in recruiting Wagner to the PC party a few years earlier, and the two wound up as rivals for Quebec delegates, most of whom were recruited by Wagner, who even blocked Mulroney from becoming a voting delegate at the convention. In the leadership race, Mulroney spent an estimated $500,000, far more than the other candidates, earning him the nickname "Cadillac candidate". At the 1976 leadership convention, Mulroney placed second on the first ballot behind Wagner. His expensive campaign, slick image, lack of parliamentary experience, and vague policy positions did not endear him to many delegates, and he was unable to build on his base of support. He was overtaken by eventual winner Joe Clark on the second ballot. Mulroney was the only one of the eleven leadership candidates who did not provide full financial disclosure of his campaign expenses, and his campaign finished deeply in debt.

== Business leadership (1976–1983) ==
Mulroney became executive vice-president of the Iron Ore Company of Canada, a joint subsidiary of three major U.S. steel corporations. Mulroney earned a salary well into the six-figure range. In 1977, he was appointed company president. Drawing upon his labour law experience, he instituted improved labour relations, and, with commodity prices on the rise, company profits soared during the next several years. In 1983, Mulroney successfully negotiated the closing of the Schefferville mine, winning a generous settlement for the affected workers. Following his defeat in the 1976 leadership race, Mulroney struggled with alcohol abuse and depression for several years; he credited his wife, Mila, with helping him recover. In 1979, he stopped drinking alcohol permanently. During his IOC term, he made liberal use of the company's executive jet, frequently flying business associates and friends on fishing trips. Mulroney also maintained and expanded his extensive political networking among business leaders and conservatives across the country. As his business reputation grew, he was invited onto several corporate boards.

== Opposition leader (1983–1984) ==
Joe Clark led the Progressive Conservative Party to a minority government in the 1979 federal election, ending 16 years of continuous Liberal rule. Clark's government fell after a successful no-confidence motion over the budget in December 1979. The PCs subsequently lost the federal election held two months later to Trudeau and the Liberals. Many Tories were also annoyed with Clark over his delay in making patronage appointments after he became prime minister in June 1979. By late 1982, Joe Clark's leadership of the Progressive Conservatives was being questioned in many party circles and among many Tory members of Parliament, despite his solid national lead over Prime Minister Pierre Trudeau in opinion polls.

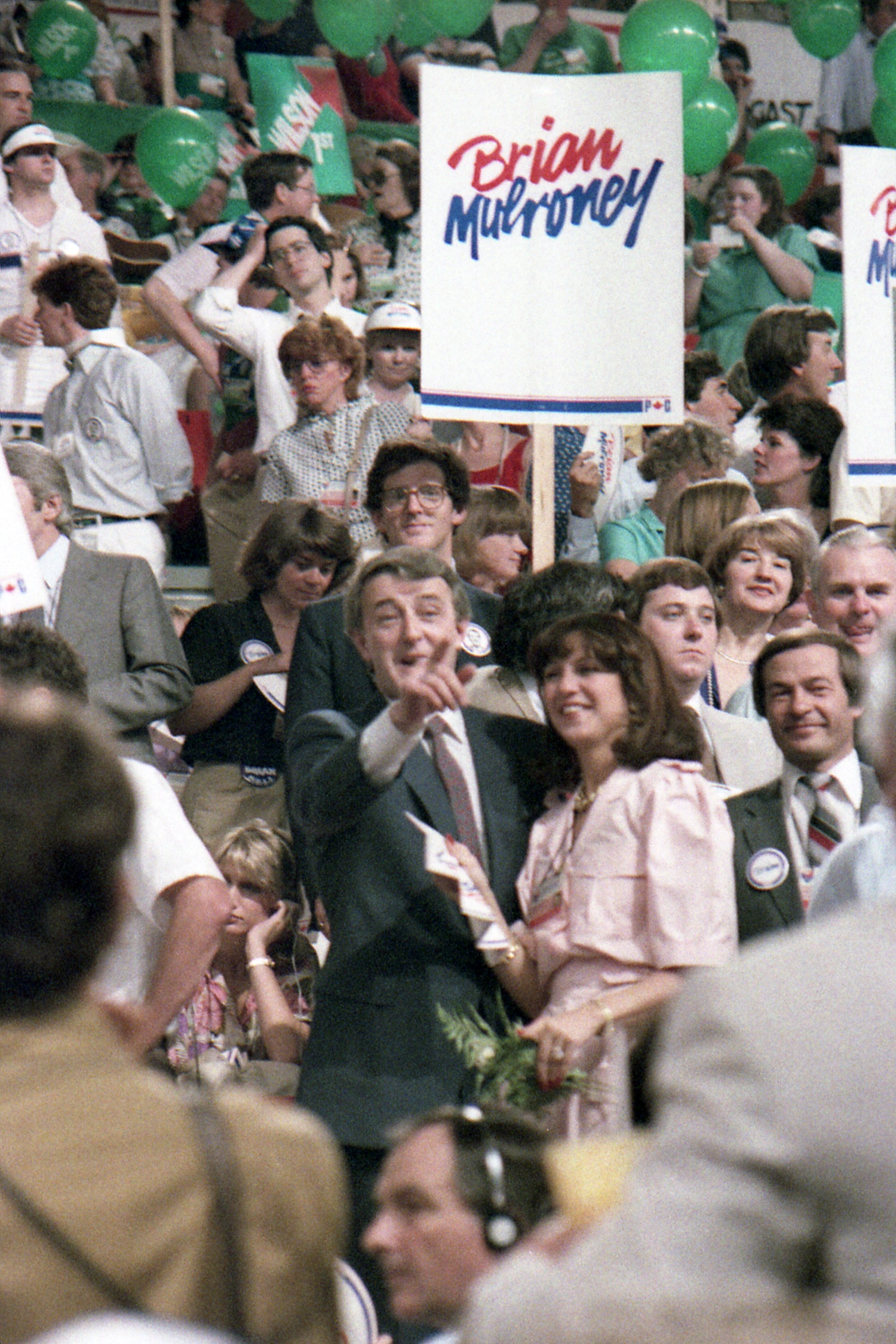
Mulroney on the floor of the 1983 leadership convention

Mulroney, while publicly endorsing Clark at a press conference in 1982, organized behind the scenes to defeat him at the party's leadership review. Clark's key Quebec organizer, Rodrigue Pageau, was secretly working for Mulroney, undermining Clark's support. When Clark received an endorsement by only 66.9 percent of delegates at the party convention in January 1983 in Winnipeg, he resigned and ran to regain his post at the 1983 leadership convention. Despite still not being a member of Parliament, Mulroney ran against him, campaigning more shrewdly than he had done seven years before. Mulroney had been criticized in 1976 for lacking policy depth and substance, a weakness he addressed by making several major speeches across the country in the early 1980s, which were collected into a book, Where I Stand, published in 1983.

Mulroney also avoided much of the showmanship of his earlier campaign, for which he had been criticized. Mulroney was elected party leader on June 11, 1983, beating Clark on the fourth ballot, attracting broad support from the many factions of the party and especially from representatives of his native Quebec. Pundits noted that a poll of delegates on the final ballot showed that Mulroney had won a bare majority of Clark's home province of Alberta and that Clark had won a bare majority in Mulroney's home province of Quebec. Mulroney's strong showing among Ontario delegates (65 percent to 35 percent) seemed to account for most of his margin of victory. A New York Times article from 1984 argued that Mulroney was elected from "the right-wing elements" within the party. Tasha Kheiriddin, writing in La Presse, argued that "Brian Mulroney's injuries to Joe Clark in 1983 took more than 15 years to heal, as various factions continued to compete for leadership roles in the field and youth wings."

Two months later, Mulroney entered Parliament as the MP for Central Nova in Nova Scotia, winning a by-election in what was then considered a safe Tory seat after Elmer MacKay stood aside in his favour. The Progressive Conservatives only had one seat in Mulroney's home province of Quebec.

Throughout his political career, Mulroney's fluency in English and French, with Quebec roots in both cultures, gave him an advantage that eventually proved decisive.

By the start of 1984, as Mulroney began learning the realities of parliamentary life in the House of Commons, the Tories took a substantial lead in opinion polling. Trudeau was widely expected to lose to Mulroney in the general election, which had to be held by 1985. Trudeau announced his retirement in February and was succeeded as Liberal leader and prime minister by his former finance minister, John Turner, in June. The Liberals then surged in the polls to take a lead after trailing by more than 20 percentage points. Only four days after being sworn in as prime minister, Turner called a general election for September. However, the Liberal election campaign organization was in disarray, leading to a weak campaign.

In the early days of the campaign, Mulroney made several gaffes regarding patronage, insulting ambassador Bryce Mackasey with the phrase "there's no whore like an old whore". Most of the campaign is best remembered for his attacks on a raft of Liberal patronage appointments. In his final days in office, Trudeau had controversially appointed a flurry of senators, judges, and executives on various governmental and crown corporation boards, widely seen as a way to offer "plum jobs" to loyal members of the Liberal Party. Upon assuming office, Turner had been under pressure to advise governor general Jeanne Sauvé to cancel the appointments—which convention would then have required Sauvé to do. Turner did not, instead appointing several more Liberals to prominent political offices per a signed legal agreement with Trudeau.

Turner had planned to attack Mulroney over the patronage machine that the latter had set up in anticipation of victory. In a televised leaders' debate, Turner launched what appeared to be the start of a blistering attack on Mulroney by comparing his patronage machine to that of the old Union Nationale in Quebec. Mulroney successfully turned the tables by pointing to the recent raft of Liberal patronage appointments. He demanded that Turner apologize to the country for making "these horrible appointments." Turner replied, "I had no option," saying he had to let the appointments stand. Mulroney famously responded:

You had an option, sir. You could have said, 'I am not going to do it. This is wrong for Canada, and I am not going to ask Canadians to pay the price.' You had an option, sir—to say 'no'—and you chose to say 'yes' to the old attitudes and the old stories of the Liberal Party. That, sir, if I may say respectfully, is not good enough for Canadians.

Turner struggled to respond to Mulroney's remarks. He repeated, "I had no option." A visibly angry Mulroney called this "an avowal of failure" and "a confession of non-leadership." The exchange led news coverage the next day, with most of them paraphrasing Mulroney's counterattack as "You had an option, sir—you could have said 'no.'" Many observers believe that at this point, Mulroney assured himself of becoming prime minister.

On September 4, Mulroney and the Tories won the second-largest majority government by percentage of seats in Canadian history, winning 74.8 percent of seats in the House of Commons; the 1958 election had seen the Tories win 78.5 percent of seats. Mulroney's government took 211 seats, three more than their previous record in 1958 and the highest number ever won by any party in Canadian history. The Liberals won only 40 seats, which, at the time, was their worst performance ever and the worst defeat for a governing party at the federal level in Canadian history. The Progressive Conservatives won just over half of the popular vote (compared to 53.4 percent in 1958) and led in every province, emerging as a national party for the first time since 1958. Especially important was the Tories' performance in Mulroney's home province, Quebec. The Tories had only won the most seats in that province once since 1896: in the 1958 Tory landslide. Amid anger at Trudeau and following Mulroney's promise of a new deal for Quebec, the province shifted its support strongly toward Mulroney. The Tories had only won one seat out of 75 in 1980 but took 58 seats in 1984. Mulroney yielded Central Nova back to MacKay and instead ran and won in the eastern Quebec riding of Manicouagan, which included Baie-Comeau.

In 1984, the Canadian Press named Mulroney "Newsmaker of the Year" for the second straight year, making him only the second prime minister to have received the honour both before becoming prime minister and while serving as prime minister (the other being Lester Pearson).

== Prime Minister (1984–1993) ==
The first Conservative majority victory in 26 years—and only the second in 54 years—initially seemed to give Mulroney a strong position. The Tories had won just over half the popular vote, and no other party crossed the 50-seat mark. Although it appeared as though he had wide discretion to take Canada in virtually any direction he wanted, his position was far more precarious than his parliamentary majority would suggest. Mulroney's support was based on a grand coalition of socially conservative populists from the West, Quebec nationalists, and fiscal conservatives from Ontario and Atlantic Canada. Such diverse interests became difficult for him to reconcile as the years went on, and eventually led to the collapse of the grand coalition entirely in 1993.

Most of Mulroney's ministers had little government experience, resulting in conflicts of interest and embarrassing scandals. Many Tories expected patronage appointments due to the long time out of government. Mulroney included a large number of Westerners in his cabinet (including Clark as minister of external affairs). He also faced setbacks outside economic and constitutional policy. For example, he moved CF-18 servicing from Manitoba to Quebec in 1986, even though the Manitoba bid was lower and the company was better rated. Mulroney also received death threats for exerting pressure on Manitoba over French language rights.

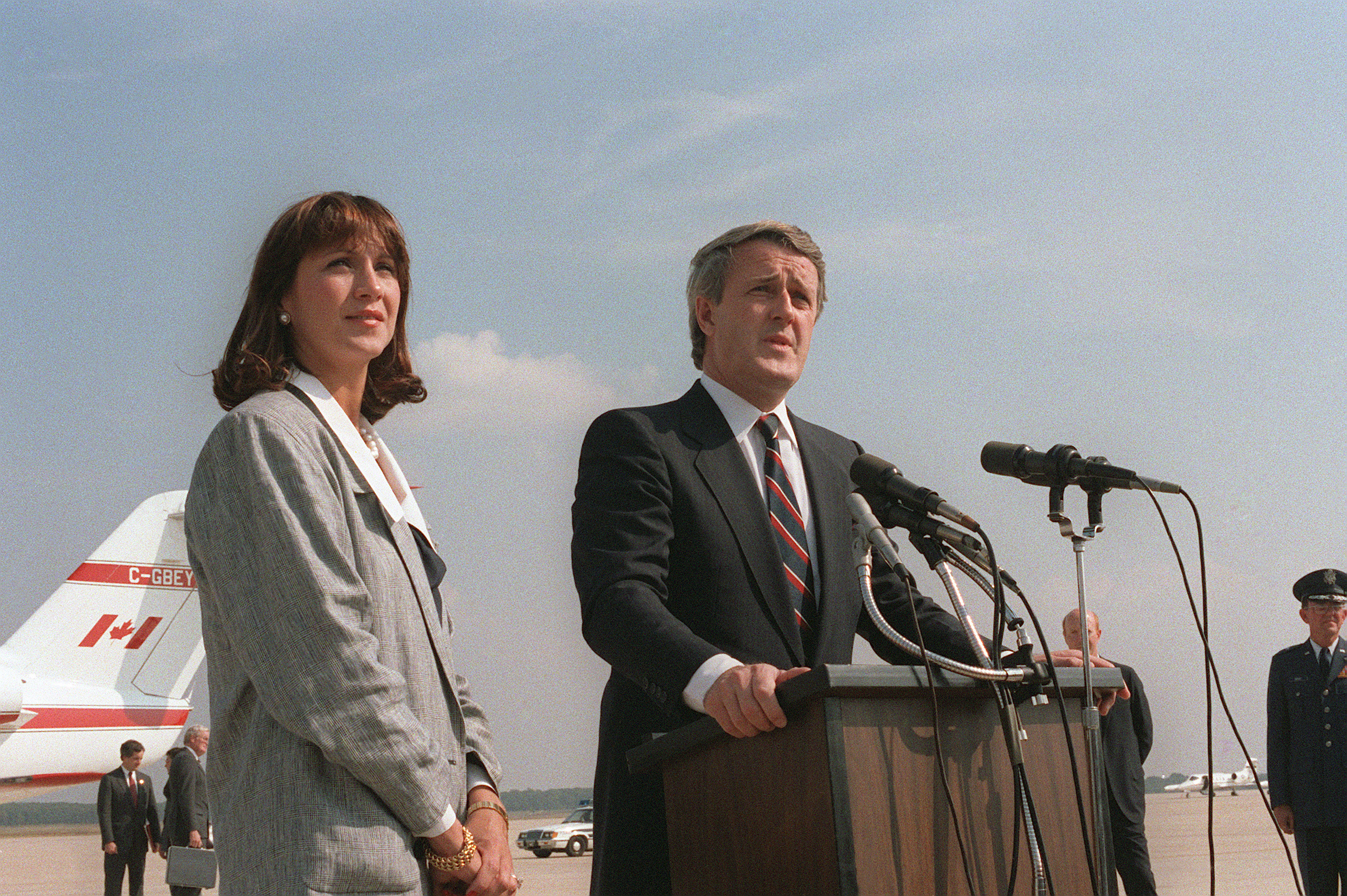
Mila (left) and Brian (right) Mulroney at Andrews Air Force Base in September 1984

=== Economic policy ===
==== Social programs and spending ====
Although Mulroney had referred to social programs as a "sacred trust" when he was Opposition leader in 1983, he began to reduce expenditures on the programs when he came into office. In terms of old age security, Mulroney's government gradually reduced its benefits at middle-income levels and above. Mulroney's government cut spending on unemployment insurance (UI) and reduced the number of workers eligible for benefits. In its first budget in 1985, the Mulroney government announced that registered home ownership savings plan (RHOSP) contributions would not be deductible if made after May 22, 1985 (funds left in the RHOSP after this date could be withdrawn tax-free, "regardless of the use" (Note: Withdrawals made prior to May 22, 1985, must meet usage requirements to be received tax-free.)) and no contribution could be made after December 31, 1985; (Note: They would otherwise be reincluded in the taxpayer's income if made between May 22, 1985, and December 31, 1985.) the government also announced that income earned in an RHOSP after December 31, 1985, was to be included in the owner's taxable income, effectively ending the last desirable feature of RHOSPs. In 1990, the government limited cost-sharing under the Canada Assistance Plan in three provinces in response to their concerns that unemployed workers would apply for cost-shared provincial social assistance (as a result of rising unemployment). Also in 1990, Mulroney's government eliminated its financial contribution to UI, making all UI costs covered by worker and employer contributions. In spring 1993, the government lowered benefits for unemployed Canadians and eliminated benefits for the unemployed who failed to prove the reason they left their job.

In 1985, Mulroney's government introduced a four-year plan to restructure family benefits. Starting in 1986, family allowances were partially indexed to the cost of living. For three years, from 1986 to 1988, the refundable child tax credits were increased to $549 per year. Starting in 1989, the tax credits were partially indexed in the same manner as family allowances. That same year, as part of the government's program to target social benefits to low- and middle-income Canadians, universal family allowances ended as high-income parents were required to repay all of their benefits at tax-filing time. This system maintained and increased a tax deduction for childcare expenses, benefiting high-income families the most. In 1992, the government replaced family allowances with a new Child Tax Benefit that included the family allowance, the Refundable Child Tax Credit, and a non-refundable child tax credit. The new benefit paid a maximum of $85 per month per child up to the age of 18 and was tax-free. It was income-tested on the net family income reported in the preceding year's income tax returns.

Mulroney's government reduced the federal workforce by 1 percent each year from 1986 to 1991, resulting in the laying off of 11,000 federal employees. Mulroney's government transferred a significantly increased share of the costs of universal health care and higher education to the provinces, departing from the previous standard of cost-sharing between the two levels of government. As a result, some provinces had to drop insurance coverage for certain medical procedures and drugs. Mulroney's government eliminated subsidies to government-owned passenger rail and postal services, resulting in the closing of post offices in some small towns and the elimination of certain train routes. The government also introduced fees for forwarding misdirected letters. Under Mulroney, military spending growth was reduced to 1.5 percent per year and foreign aid growth was reduced to 3 percent per year. Mulroney also put spending limits on medicare.

==== Deficit ====
One of Mulroney's priorities was to lower the deficit, which under Pierre Trudeau had increased from $667 million in the 1968 budget to $37.2 billion in the 1984 budget. By 1988, Mulroney's government had cut the deficit to $28 billion, but it subsequently increased. The Progressive Conservatives' final budget in 1993 produced a deficit of $38.5 billion, about the same level as when Trudeau left office. As a percent of GDP, the deficit was reduced from 8.3 percent to 5.6 percent during Mulroney's tenure.

List of budgets passed by the Mulroney government Figures are in billions of unadjusted Canadian dollars.
Budget	1985	1986	1987	1988	1989	1990	1991	1992	1993
Deficit	$33.389	$29.842	$29.017	$27.947	$29.143	$33.899	$32.319	$39.019	$38.5

The worldwide recession of the early 1990s significantly damaged the government's financial situation. Mulroney's inability to improve the government's finances, as well as his use of tax increases to deal with it, were major factors in alienating the Western conservative portion of his power base; this contrasted with his tax cuts earlier as part of his "pro-business" plan, which had increased the deficit. At the same time, the Bank of Canada began to raise interest rates in order to meet a zero inflation target; the experiment was regarded as a failure that exacerbated the effect of the recession in Canada. Annual budget deficits ballooned to record levels, reaching $42 billion in his last year of office. These deficits grew the national debt dangerously close to the psychological benchmark of 100 percent of GDP, further weakening the Canadian dollar and damaging Canada's international credit rating.

==== Taxation ====
Mulroney's government de-indexed personal income tax brackets and eliminated open corporate tax loopholes. The government also increased taxes on alcohol, tobacco and gasoline. In 1988, Mulroney's government reduced the corporate income tax from 36 percent to 28 percent. That year, his government increased the capital gains tax inclusion rate from 50 percent to 66.67 percent before increasing it to 75 percent in 1990.

Mulroney's government passed a major tax reform bill, Bill C-139, which was made effective on January 1, 1988. It included reforms to personal and corporate income taxes. The bill expanded the tax base for personal and corporate income; lowered rates applicable to taxable income; supplanted exemptions with credits; and removed certain deductions for personal income tax. The bill replaced the 1987 rate schedule of 10 brackets (with rates ranging from 6 to 34 percent) with a schedule of only three brackets (with rates of 17 percent, 26 percent, and 29 percent). The bill also limited the lifetime capital gains exemption to $100,000; lowered capital cost allowances; established limitations on deductible business expenses; and cut the dividend tax credit.

In August 1989, Mulroney's government announced the introduction of a nine percent national sales tax, the goods and services tax (GST), to replace the hidden 13.5 percent manufacturers' sales tax (MST). The government argued that the MST damaged the Canadian economy's competitiveness as it only applied to domestically manufactured goods, as opposed to the new GST, which applied to domestic and imported goods. The GST did not apply to basic groceries, prescription drugs, health and dental care, educational services, daycare, and legal aid. Following public backlash, Mulroney's government reduced the tax to seven percent. Although the government argued that the GST was not a tax increase but a tax shift, its visibility made it extremely unpopular, and many polls showed that as many as 80 percent of Canadians opposed it. Two Progressive Conservative MPs from Alberta, David Kilgour and Alex Kindy, left the party in protest of the tax. The Senate with a Liberal majority refused to pass the GST. Mulroney used Section 26 (the Deadlock Clause), a little-known Constitutional provision, allowing him in an emergency situation to ask the Queen to appoint eight new senators. On September 27, 1990, with the Queen's approval, Mulroney added the eight new senators, giving the Tories their first majority in the Senate in nearly 50 years. In December 1990, the GST was passed in the Senate and was made effective on January 1, 1991. Mulroney's use of an emergency clause was controversial and contributed to his decline in popularity.

One of the causes of the early 1990s recession was several tax increases instituted by Mulroney's government between 1989 and 1991. The introduction of the goods and services tax and increases related to excise and payroll taxes were estimated to have reduced real GDP growth by 1.6, 2.4 and 5.1 percentage points in 1990, 1991 and 1992, respectively. Had these tax increases not been implemented, the national debt would have increased significantly.

==== Privatizations ====
Mulroney's government privatized many of Canada's Crown corporations. In 1984, the Government of Canada held 61 Crown corporations. Under Mulroney, it sold off 23 of them, including Air Canada, which was completely privatized by 1989, although the Air Canada Public Participation Act continued to make certain requirements of the airline. Mulroney's government also privatized Connaught Laboratories in 1984 through two public issues (one in 1984 and one in 1987) and Petro-Canada in 1991.

==== Energy policy ====
On June 1, 1985, Mulroney's government negotiated the Western Accord on Energy with the governments of the oil-producing provinces. It permitted the full deregulation of oil prices and allowed the market forces of international and local supply and demand to determine prices. This accord abolished the National Energy Program, which was a policy of Trudeau's Liberal government that was highly unpopular in the Western provinces.

=== Environmental policy ===
The environment was a key focus of Mulroney's government. His government added eight new national parks (including Bruce Peninsula and South Moresby), and passed the Canadian Environmental Assessment Act and Canadian Environmental Protection Act.

In 1987, Mulroney hosted an international climate conference in Montreal, Quebec. There, 46 nations signed the Montreal Protocol to limit the use and production of chlorofluorocarbons (CFCs); this agreement came after the discovery that CFCs were depleting the ozone layer.

Mulroney secured the U.S.–Canada Air Quality Agreement, an environmental treaty on acid rain, with United States president George H. W. Bush in 1991. Both nations committed to reducing the emissions of the air pollutants (sulphur dioxide and nitrogen oxide) that caused acid rain through a cap-and-trade system. Negotiations began in 1986 when Mulroney first discussed the issue with then-president Ronald Reagan. Mulroney repeatedly pressed the issue in public meetings with Reagan in 1987 and 1988.

Under Mulroney, Canada became the first industrialized country to ratify the 1992 Convention on Biological Diversity at the Earth Summit in Rio de Janeiro, Brazil. Conference experts claimed that Canada's signing of the treaty motivated the United Kingdom and Germany to pledge their support and thus avoid the convention's defeat. The conference also introduced the United Nations Framework Convention on Climate Change, which sought to reduce greenhouse gas emissions to an environmentally friendly level; Canada was the first Group of Seven (G7) nation to sign the treaty. At the convention, Mulroney pledged $260 million from Canada toward advancing sustainable development for developing nations; this included an offer to forgive $145 million in debts owed to Canada by Latin American nations on the condition that the sum of money be used for sustainable development and social programs. At the end of the conference, Mulroney stated, "I leave this conference believing we have a better chance of saving the world than we had when we came here."

By 1992, the population of breeding-age cod off Newfoundland and Labrador had dropped to one percent of its estimated peak. Concerned about the overfishing of cod stocks off the coast of the province, Mulroney's government imposed a moratorium on cod fishing in the summer of that year. It initially set the ban for a minimum of two years, but later extended it indefinitely. This resulted in the layoff of 30,000–40,000 workers. Mulroney's government introduced the Northern Cod Adjustment and Recovery Program (NCARP) that provided unemployment insurance payments and retraining to workers; most of the workers viewed this as insufficient. In the first decade of the ban, Newfoundland and Labrador's population fell by 10 percent as people left to search for work.

=== Immigration ===
Mulroney's government significantly boosted Canada's annual immigration targets, moving them up from around 84,000 to over 250,000 by the early 1990s, a major policy shift focusing on economic class via the points system, reflecting a broader strategy to grow the population and labour force.

=== Social policy ===
On September 22, 1988, Mulroney issued an official apology on behalf of the Canadian government for Japanese Canadian internment during World War II. Mulroney's government provided a $300-million compensation package, which included $21,000 to each of the remaining 13,000 survivors, $12 million for a Japanese community fund, and $24 million to create a Canadian race relations foundation.

Mulroney argued that he had established the Deschênes Commission of inquiry on Nazi war criminals soon after he was first elected in 1984, even though it was controversial among "communities where Nazi criminals posed as respectable citizens."

On issues of abortion, Mulroney declared he was opposed to "abortion on demand" but gave no details on what that meant legally. In the spring of 1988, the Mulroney government offered a compromise solution that would give easy access to abortion in the early stages of pregnancy and criminalize abortions later in pregnancy. The bill was defeated in the House of Commons by 147 votes to 76 in a free vote, with opposition from both MPs who opposed easy access to abortion and those who opposed adding abortion restrictions to the Criminal Code. Some pro-life social conservatives who played a role in Mulroney's 1984 landslide were disappointed by this move, as they were in favour of outlawing abortion completely, regardless of the circumstances. In 1989, the government introduced a much stricter bill. If enacted, it would ban all abortions unless a doctor ruled the woman's life or health would be threatened. Anyone found in violation of the law could be imprisoned for up to two years. In another free vote, the House of Commons passed the new bill by nine votes. A few months later, the bill failed in the Senate on a tie vote. Under the rules of the Senate, a tie meant the measure was defeated. This was the last time the federal government attempted to enact abortion laws. Today, abortion in Canada remains completely legal at all stages of pregnancy, regardless of the reason.

In 1991, Frank magazine ran a satirical advertisement for a contest inviting young Tories to "Deflower Caroline Mulroney." Her father was incensed and threatened physical harm toward those responsible before joining several women's groups in denouncing the ad as an incitement to rape on national television. Frank editor Michael Bate described the spoof, which was intended to mock her father for bringing her to public adult-oriented events, as "clumsy" but expressed no regrets. Bate also expressed sympathy for her father's reaction to the spoof.

=== Attempted constitutional reform ===
==== Meech Lake Accord ====
A major undertaking by Mulroney's government was an attempt to resolve the divisive issue of national unity. In 1981, Quebec premier René Lévesque, leader of the Quebec nationalist Parti Québécois government, had been the only provincial premier not to agree to the package of constitutional amendments which patriated the Constitution of Canada. In the 1985 Quebec provincial election, the Parti Québécois government suffered a landslide defeat to the Liberals led by Robert Bourassa. Some believed that the new Quebec government's moderate stance on nationalism would allow the province to formally endorse the constitution. Mulroney wanted Quebec to endorse the constitution and wanted to include Quebec in a new agreement with the rest of Canada. In August 1986, Mulroney met with provincial premiers in Edmonton, Alberta, where the ministers agreed to the "Edmonton Declaration". It stated that a "Quebec Round" of constitutional talks would be based on Bourassa's five conditions for Quebec to endorse the constitution (recognition of Quebec's distinct character (Quebec being historically Catholic and majority French-speaking); a veto for Quebec in constitutional matters; input from Quebec into the appointment of Supreme Court justices; entrenchment of Quebec's role in immigration; and a limit on the federal spending power) and would occur before further reforms were undertaken.

Mulroney called a First Ministers' conference with the ten provincial premiers for April 30, 1987, at Willson House, located on the shores of Meech Lake, Quebec, in the Gatineau Hills. During the conference, Mulroney negotiated the Meech Lake Accord, a package of constitutional amendments designed to satisfy Quebec's demand for recognition as a "distinct society" within Canada. The accord also devolved some powers to the provinces, such as giving them a role in nominating people to serve in some federal institutions (e.g., the Senate and Supreme Court of Canada); allowing provinces to withdraw from federally-financed social programs on the condition that the province establish its own program that meets national standards; giving constitutional status to federal–provincial immigration agreements; and mandating annual First Ministers' conferences (the accord also required that Senate reform and fisheries be discussed at the conferences), which made the federal-provincial consultative process constitutional. At a final roll call at 4:45 a.m. on June 3, 1987, hours before the signing ceremony, Mulroney knowingly breached convention by taking the vote in reverse order around the table instead of the traditional order of a province's entry into confederation. At the symbolic signing ceremony, the premiers signed the Accord. The agreement would have changed the constitution's amending formula. It therefore needed to be ratified by the federal parliament and the legislatures of all ten provinces. As well, other parts of the accord were made under the general amendment provision. That meant that there was a three-year deadline for those amendments to pass. On June 23, 1987, Quebec became the first province to approve the accord, triggering the three-year time limit provided for by section 39(2) of the Constitution Act, 1982; this meant that June 22, 1990, would be the last possible day the accord could pass.

Opinion polls showed that a majority of Canadians supported the accord. Some believed the accord would weaken Quebec separatism. Critics believed the accord would weaken the federal government's authority, and some from English Canada worried the "distinct society" clause would give Quebec special status to the detriment of the other nine provinces. Mulroney told the Toronto Star, "You can have the old style of warring federalism, or you can have genuine co-operative federalism, on which we're trying to build a new country." As criticism grew, support for the accord declined outside of Quebec; some there feared its failure would spark a backlash in the province and damage national unity.

A commission headed by Mulroney's former cabinet minister, Jean Charest, recommended a companion accord that would address the concerns of other provinces, affirm that the distinct society clause would be subject to the Charter, and provide greater protections for minority language rights in the provinces. Mulroney's environment minister and Quebec lieutenant, Lucien Bouchard, viewed the companion accord as a betrayal of Meech and subsequently praised the Parti Québécois in a telegram. Mulroney reportedly demanded Bouchard clarify the remark or resign, and Bouchard supplied a lengthy letter of resignation on May 22, 1990. Mulroney claimed he fired Bouchard. Bouchard left the Progressive Conservatives soon afterward. After the failure of the Accord, Bouchard convinced several other Tories and Liberals to join him to form the Bloc Québécois, a pro-sovereigntist party.

In early June 1990, all premiers finally agreed to ratify the accord (Note: In June 1987, all ten premiers agreed to ratify the Accord. Between then and June 1990, three anti-Meech premiers took office: Frank McKenna became premier of New Brunswick in October 1987, Gary Filmon became premier of Manitoba in 1988, and Clyde Wells became premier of Newfoundland and Labrador in 1989. The three premiers refused to support the Accord until their concerns were met in June 1990.) provided that further constitutional discussions were held on an elected Senate, the amending formula, equality, and Indigenous issues. Around that time, New Brunswick agreed to ratify the agreement. Manitoba and Newfoundland and Labrador remained the only provinces not to have ratified it; they only had a few weeks left. Unanimous support from every member of the Manitoba Legislative Assembly was required to bypass the necessary public consultations in the assembly and proceed with ratification. On June 12, 1990, Member of the Legislative Assembly of Manitoba Elijah Harper announced his opposition to the Accord on the grounds that Indigenous groups had not been consulted. Harper's opposition prevented the amendment from proceeding; thus, the accord failed to pass in the legislature. This allowed the premier of Newfoundland and Labrador, Clyde Wells (who revoked the province's previous assent though reluctantly agreed to ratify the accord in June 1990), to excuse himself from bringing the accord to a vote in the Newfoundland and Labrador House of Assembly. The accord failed to be ratified as Manitoba and Newfoundland and Labrador did not approve of it by the June 23, 1990, deadline.

==== Charlottetown Accord ====
Following the failure of Meech Lake, Mulroney made a second attempt to secure Quebec's endorsement of the constitution. He appointed his foreign minister, Joe Clark, as the first minister responsible for constitutional affairs on April 21, 1991. Clark was responsible for establishing a new accord to end the constitutional deadlock with Quebec. Mulroney's government appointed two Quebec bodies (the Allaire Committee and the Belanger-Campeau Committee) and two national bodies (the Beaudoin-Edwards Committee and the Spicer Commission) to engage in discussions regarding constitutional reform. These bodies generated various reports, including the federal document titled Shaping Canada's Future Together. The Mulroney government then held five national conferences to discuss the proposals in the document. The conferences led to another federal report titled A Renewed Canada. Afterward, negotiations between the federal, provincial, and territorial governments occurred. Unlike the Meech Lake Accord, Indigenous peoples were included in the discussions. Quebec joined the negotiations in the final stages. The negotiations culminated in the Charlottetown Accord, which was unveiled in Charlottetown, Prince Edward Island, on August 28, 1992.

The accord gave provinces jurisdiction over forestry, mining, cultural affairs, (Note: The federal government would still have power over national groups such as the Canadian Broadcasting Corporation (CBC) and the National Film Board.) and other areas; required the federal government to negotiate policy with the provinces in certain areas such as telecommunications, labour and training, regional development, and immigration; abolished disallowance (which gives the federal Cabinet power to overrule provincial legislation within one year of it being passed); and required provincial consent before the federal government could gain power over provincial infrastructure projects. The accord allowed provinces to create their own social programs and mandated the federal government to compensate provinces as long as the provincial social programs met national standards. It also mandated the federal government to compensate provinces that withdrew from any constitutional amendment that transferred provincial powers to the federal government; the compensation would allow provinces to fund their own programs. In addition, the accord addressed Indigenous self-government and contained the "Canada Clause", which defined Canadian values including egalitarianism, multiculturalism, and recognition of Quebec as a distinct society. Finally, the accord entrenched the structure and appointment process for the Supreme Court of Canada in the constitution; changed the Senate into a Triple-E Senate with reduced powers (such as requiring a majority of all senators and a majority of Francophone senators in certain votes); increased the number of seats in the House of Commons; guaranteed Quebec at least a quarter of the Commons' seats; and increased the number of matters that require unanimous approval for a constitutional amendment.

The accord was supported by the federal government and all ten provincial governments. Although it could have been ratified as a constitutional amendment, Mulroney's government insisted on holding a national referendum to avoid a repetition of the criticism that the Meech Lake Accord was agreed upon without public approval. On October 26, 1992, two referendums, one national (without Quebec) and one in Quebec, were held, asking if Canadians agreed with the Charlottetown Accord. Nationally, 54.3 percent opposed the accord. In Quebec, 56.7 percent opposed it. Many saw the accord's defeat as a protest against Mulroney's government, which was heavily unpopular due to the failure of the previous Meech Lake Accord, the introduction of the GST, and the early 1990s recession.

=== Foreign policy ===
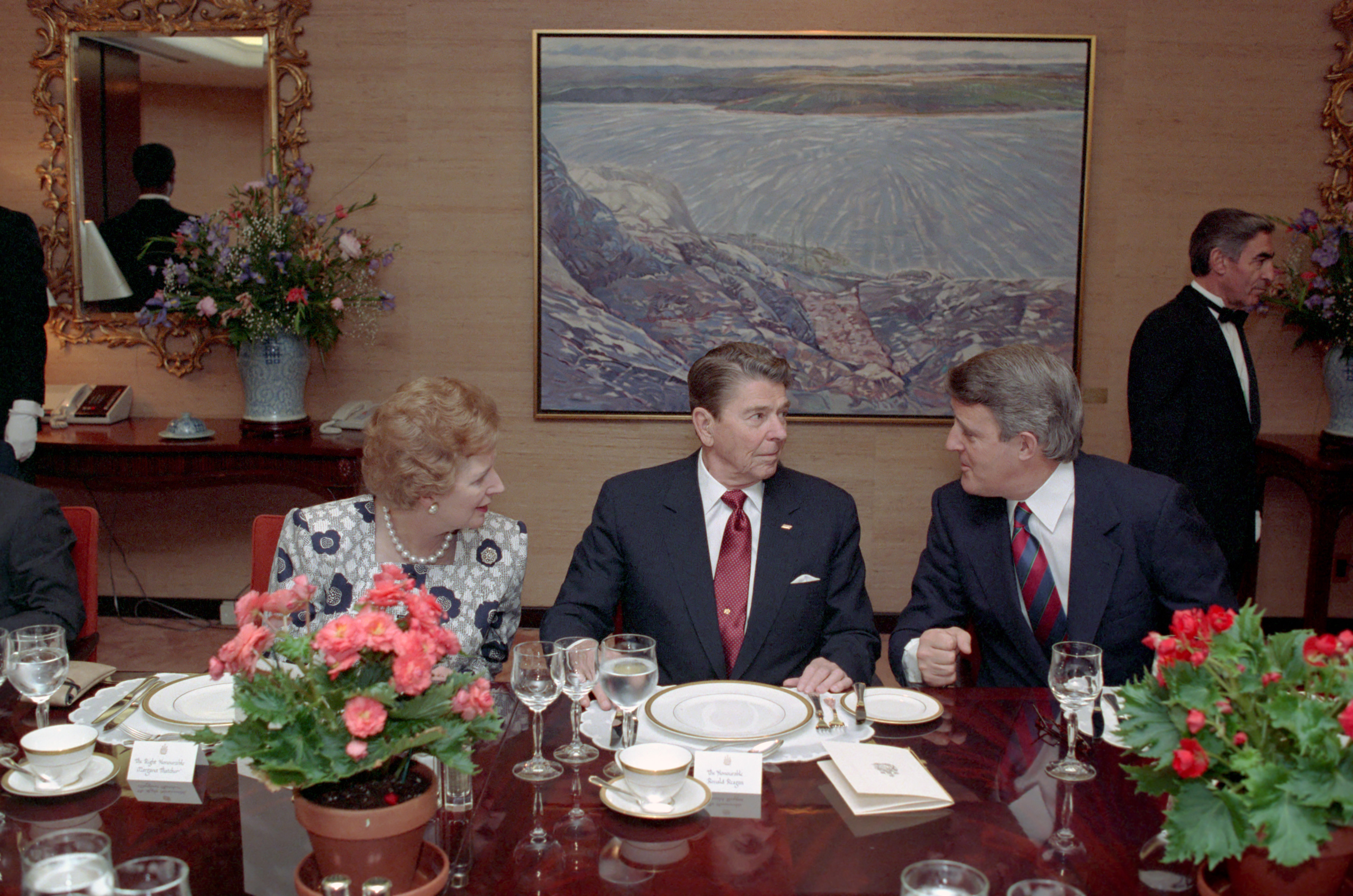
Mulroney with US President Ronald Reagan and UK Prime Minister Margaret Thatcher in 1988

As prime minister, Mulroney strengthened Canada's relations with the United States, moving away from Pierre Trudeau's third option policy of reducing American influence on Canada. Mulroney established a close relationship with U.S. president Ronald Reagan. On March 17 and 18, 1985, the "Shamrock Summit" between Mulroney and Reagan was held in Quebec City. The summit gained its name from the two leaders' Irish background, and because the meeting started on St. Patrick's Day. At the summit, Mulroney and Reagan sang When Irish Eyes are Smiling; this signified the camaraderie between the two leaders and a turning point in Canada–United States relations.

The Air India Flight 182 bombing, which originated in Montreal, occurred on June 23, 1985. This was the largest terrorist act before the September 11 attacks, with the majority of the 329 victims being Canadian citizens. Mulroney sent a letter of condolence to Indian Prime Minister Rajiv Gandhi, sparking an uproar in Canada since he did not call the families of the actual victims to offer condolences. Furthermore, there were several warnings from the Indian government to the Mulroney government about terrorist threats toward Air India flights. Questions remain as to why these warnings were not taken more seriously and whether the events leading to the bombing could have been prevented.

In November 1984, Mulroney sent his newly appointed Canadian ambassador to the United Nations, Stephen Lewis, to the Headquarters of the United Nations in New York City to persuade the General Assembly to take action against the ongoing Ethiopian famine. Days later, the UN and the Red Cross launched an effort to save seven million starving Ethiopians and 22 million others in Africa. The Mulroney government's efforts to aid Ethiopia differed from those of the United States and the United Kingdom, two Western nations which avoided taking action against the famine due to Ethiopia's Marxist regime. Mulroney's foreign affairs minister, Joe Clark, became the first senior Western official to visit Ethiopia during the famine, ahead of UN officials. Mulroney's government spent tens of millions of dollars to match private donations to combat the famine. Canada contributed more than 10 percent of international aid to Ethiopia. After the famine, Mulroney's government increased aid and development funding to Africa.

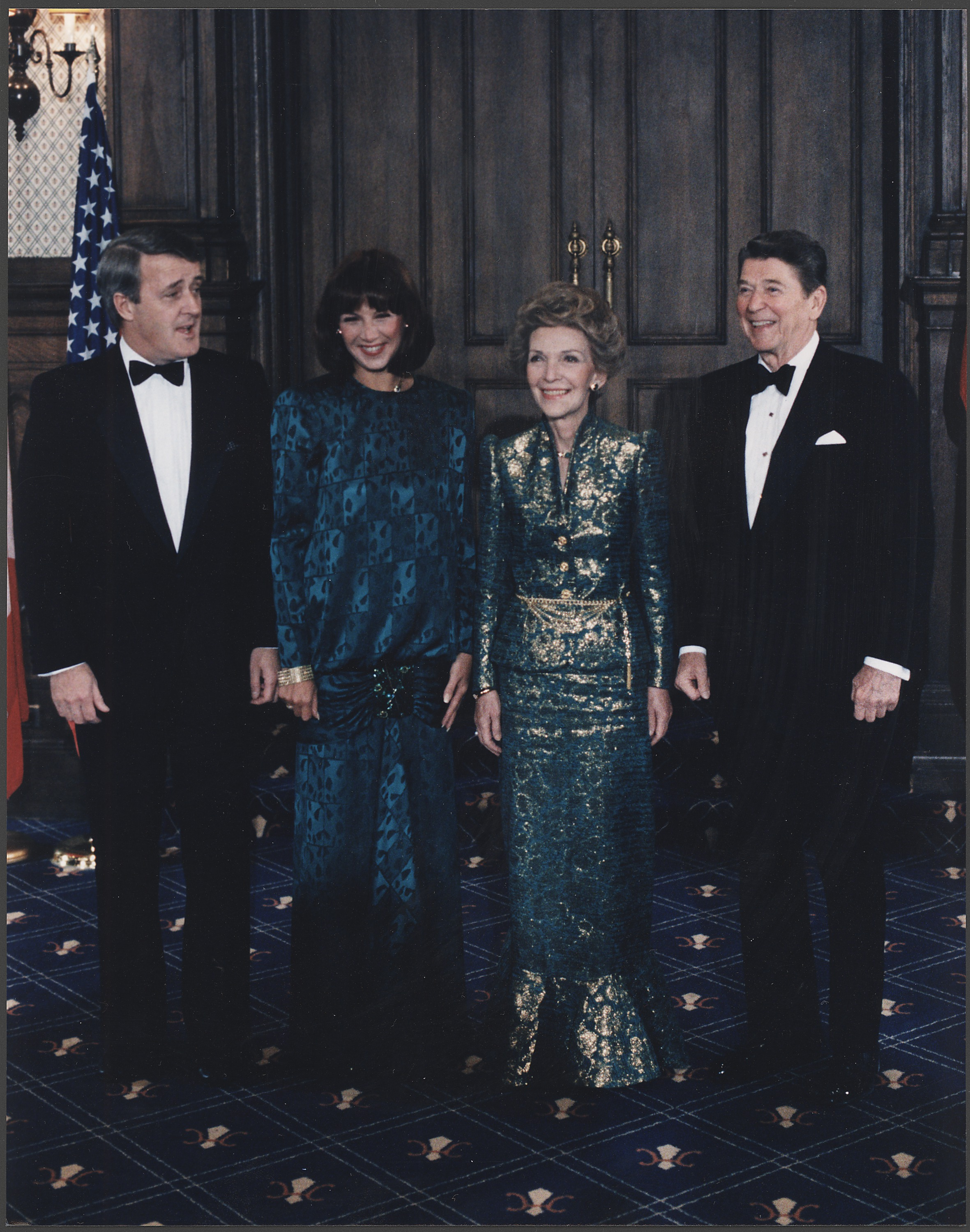
The Mulroneys with the Reagans in Quebec City, Canada, on March 18, 1985, the second day of the "Shamrock Summit."

On December 2, 1991, Canada became the first Western nation to recognize Ukraine as an independent country, the day after the landslide referendum in favour of independence in Ukraine.

==== Apartheid ====
Mulroney's government opposed the apartheid regime in South Africa. Beginning in 1985, Mulroney led an effort within the Commonwealth to sanction the South African government with the goal of pressuring them to end apartheid and release anti-apartheid activist Nelson Mandela from prison. This put Mulroney at odds with British prime minister Margaret Thatcher, who opposed apartheid but believed the sanctions could harm Britain's economic ties to the country and cause unemployment in South Africa. United States president Ronald Reagan also opposed sanctions, believing that Mandela and other leaders of the African National Congress were communists. At an October 23, 1985, United Nations General Assembly meeting, Mulroney stated, "if there is no progress in the dismantling of apartheid, [Canada]'s relations with South Africa may have to be severed completely"; he restored this line in his speech after he originally removed it at the advice of External Affairs. After an August 1986 meeting in London, Canada, along with other Commonwealth nations, implemented 11 new sanctions on South Africa, including bans on new air links, new investment, and the promotion of tourism. and imports of South African coal, metals and agricultural goods.

The day after Mandela was released on February 11, 1990, he spoke with Mulroney by telephone, thanking him for his efforts to end apartheid. Mandela chose the Parliament of Canada as the first legislature he would address. On June 18 of that year, Mandela spoke in the House of Commons of Canada, where he thanked Mulroney and Canadians. The two remained in contact after they left politics; during his annual business trips to South Africa, Mulroney visited Mandela.

==== Free trade and 1988 re-election ====
Critics noted that Mulroney had originally professed opposition to free trade during the 1983 leadership campaign, although the 1985 report of the MacDonald Commission suggested free trade to him. Negotiations between Canada and the United States for a free trade treaty started in May 1986. In October 1987, a deal was reached; the Canada–United States Free Trade Agreement (CUSFTA) stated that all tariffs between the two countries would be eliminated by 1998. This deal was achieved not least because of Mulroney's close relationship with U.S. president Ronald Reagan. This agreement was controversial; while Mulroney used his massive majority in the House of Commons to pass the bill, the Liberal-dominated Senate demanded an election before proceeding to a ratification vote. This prompted Mulroney to ask Governor General Jeanne Sauvé on October 1 to dissolve Parliament and call an election for November 21.

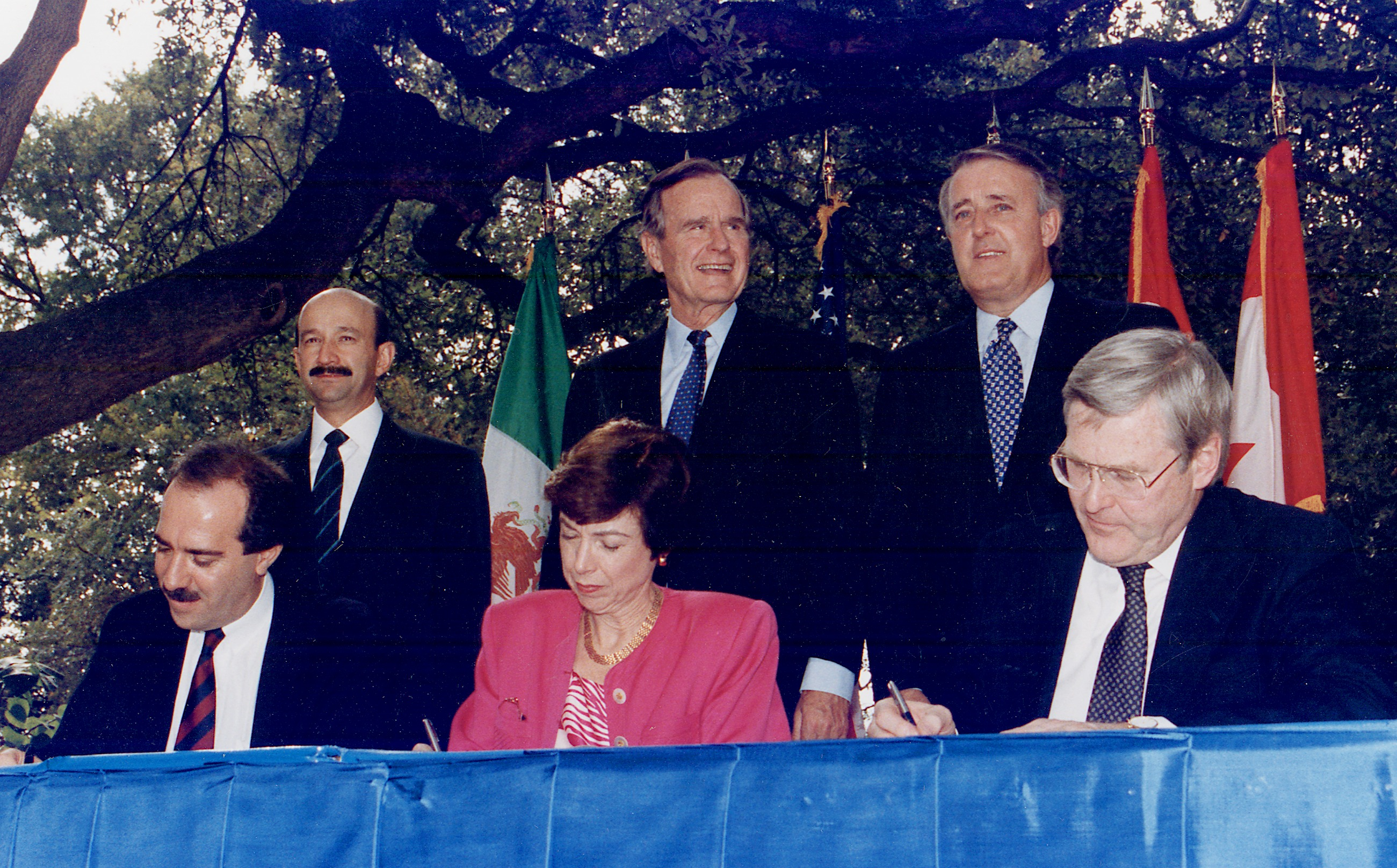
NAFTA Initialling Ceremony, October 1992; From left to right: Mexican president Salinas (standing), US president Bush, prime minister Mulroney (seated), Jaime Serra Puche, Carla Hills, Michael Wilson.

The trade deal was the main issue of the election, with the Liberals and New Democratic Party (NDP) opposing it; Liberal leader John Turner (who was preparing for his second campaign after Mulroney defeated him in 1984) believed that the agreement would "Americanize" Canada and cost many Canadian jobs. A week after the October 25 debate, the Liberals were six points ahead of the PCs. To combat this Liberal surge, the PCs began running a more negative campaign, capitalizing on the perceived lack of public confidence in Turner, his perceived inability to lead the Liberal Party, and arguing that he only opposed free trade because of political opportunism. The Progressive Conservatives' poll numbers began to rebound, and they were re-elected with a greatly reduced majority, winning 169 out of 295 seats and 43 percent of the popular vote. Mulroney became the first and only federal Canadian Conservative party leader since John A. Macdonald to lead his party to a second majority government. (Note: Conservative Prime Minister Robert Borden won two majority governments; the second majority he won in 1917 was when he was the leader of the Unionist Party, a party composed of pro-conscription Conservatives and Liberals.) The trade deal gained the support of Quebec premier Robert Bourassa, which helped the PCs maintain their standing in Quebec. In this election, Mulroney ran in another eastern Quebec seat, Charlevoix.

Also on November 21, Mulroney made a controversial Order in Council which allowed the establishment of the AMEX Bank of Canada (owned by American Express), despite finance minister Michael Wilson rejecting AMEX's application to open a Canadian bank in 1986. The Amex Bank of Canada started operating on July 1, 1990. Toronto-Dominion Bank chairman Richard Thomson accused Mulroney's government of favouritism toward Amex as its chief executive officer, James Robinson, supported free trade.

The government implemented the deal; it was made effective on January 1, 1989. In 1994, CUSFTA was replaced by the North American Free Trade Agreement (NAFTA), which now included Mexico.

==== Gulf War ====
In the early 1990s, Mulroney supported international efforts to stop Saddam Hussein's aggression in Kuwait. Mulroney worked with ambassador Yves Fortier during the crisis. Mulroney was instrumental in drafting UNSCR 678 which later led to the war when Iraq failed to heed the resolution, and Canada supported the armed UN coalition during the 1991 Gulf War through Operation SCIMITAR and Operation Friction . When the UN authorized the use of force, Canada sent a CF-18 squadron with support personnel and a field hospital to deal with casualties from the ground war as well as a company of The Royal Canadian Regiment to safeguard these ground elements. The Canadian Forces code-named Canada's participation Operation Friction. In August, Mulroney sent the destroyers HMCS Terra Nova and HMCS Athabaskan to enforce the trade blockade against Iraq. The supply ship HMCS Protecteur was also sent to support the assembling coalition forces. When the air war began, Canada's planes were integrated into the coalition force, provided air cover and attacked ground targets. This was the first time since the fighting on Cyprus in 1974 that Canadian forces participated directly in combat operations.

=== Unpopularity and retirement ===
==== Fracturing of electoral coalition ====
In late 1987, the Western Canada-based right-wing populist Reform Party of Canada was founded. The creation of the party was motivated by Western Canadian discontent with Mulroney's government and the Progressive Conservatives in general. The Reform Party opposed the Mulroney government's promotion of the Meech Lake and Charlottetown accords as well as their introduction of the goods and services tax. Although the party won only 2 percent of the popular vote and no seats in the 1988 election, it won its first seat in the Commons in the May 6, 1989, by-election in the Alberta riding of Beaver River, where Reform candidate Deborah Grey defeated Progressive Conservative candidate Dave Broda by a margin of nearly 20 percentage points. This was the first sign that Mulroney's coalition was fracturing; the PCs had dominated Alberta's federal politics since the 1958 election.

In June 1991, the pro-Quebec sovereigntist Bloc Québécois was founded by Mulroney's former environment minister and Quebec lieutenant, Lucien Bouchard. The party's foundation was motivated by the collapse of the Meech Lake Accord, which would have benefited Quebec if it had been ratified. The party attracted a few other PC and Liberal members of Parliament.

==== Resignation ====
Widespread public resentment of the goods and services tax, the early 1990s recession, the fracturing of his political coalition, and his lack of results regarding the Quebec situation caused Mulroney's popularity to decline severely during his second term. Mulroney entered 1993 facing a statutory general election. By this time, his approval ratings had dipped into the tens, and were at 12 percent in a 1992 Gallup poll, making him the most unpopular prime minister since opinion polling began in Canada in the 1940s.

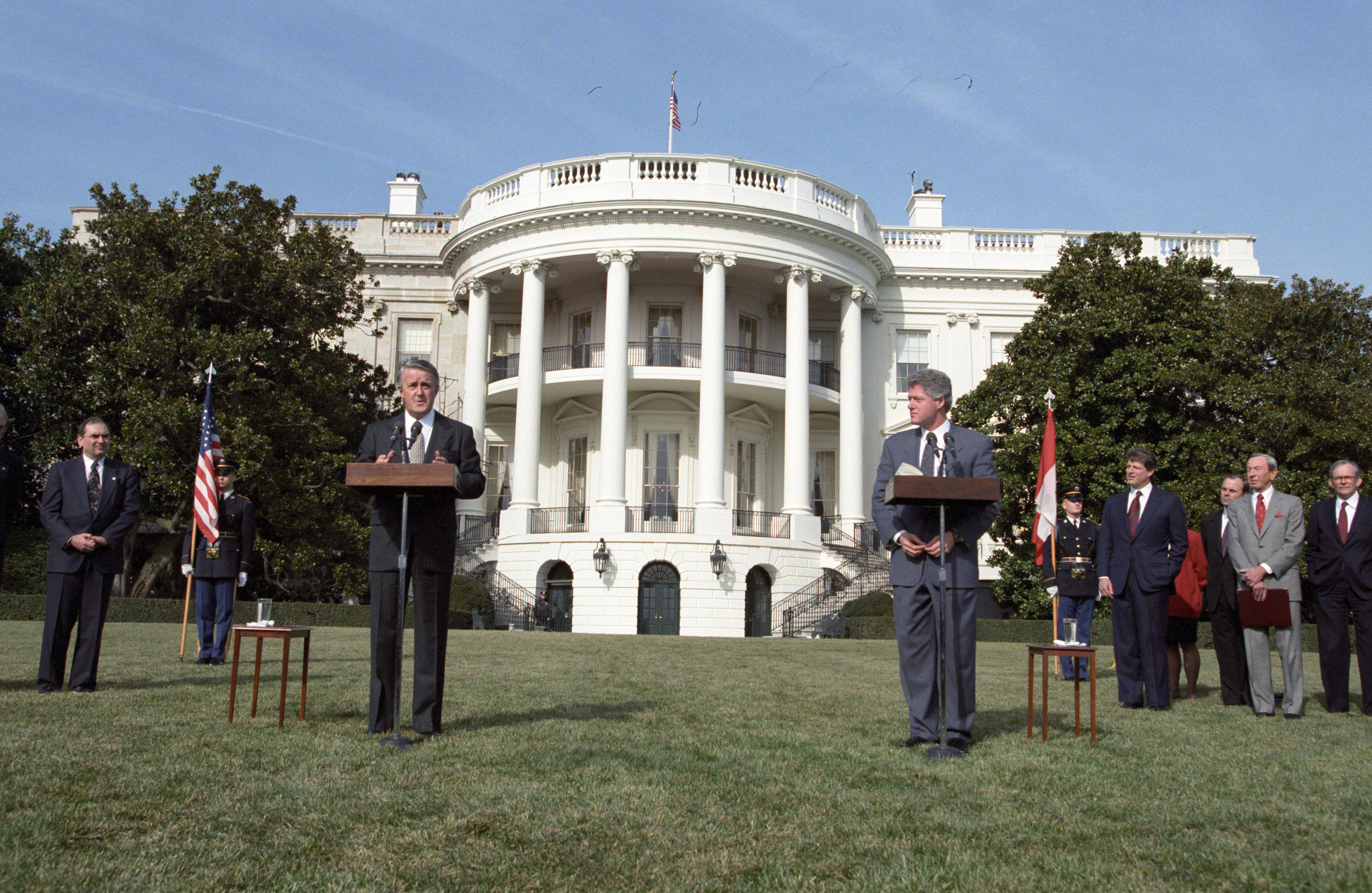
Mulroney with president Bill Clinton during a visit to Washington, D.C., shortly before his resignation announcement, February 1993

On February 24, 1993, Mulroney announced his intention to resign as prime minister and retire from politics. In his announcement, Mulroney stated, "Whether you agree with our solutions or not, none will accuse us, I think, of having chosen to evade our responsibilities by sidestepping the most controversial issues of our time." Mulroney claimed his resignation was unrelated to the widespread expectation that he would be heavily defeated by Jean Chrétien's Liberals if he led the Tories into the next election and instead argued that he could defeat the Liberals if he sought another term. The last Gallup poll taken before Mulroney's announcement of resignation showed the PCs' polling numbers had rebounded to 21 percent. In his final days in office, Mulroney conducted a European "farewell" tour using Canadian federal funds. On June 13, 1993, Mulroney was replaced as leader of the Progressive Conservatives by defence minister Kim Campbell. On June 25, 1993, Mulroney resigned as prime minister and chose not to run for re-election to the House of Commons.

==== Aftermath ====
The House of Commons after the 1993 election: Red: Liberals (177); Blue: Bloc Québécois (54); Green: Reform (52); Orange: New Democratic Party (9); Mauve: Progressive Conservatives (2); Grey: Independent (1)

In the October 25, 1993, election, the Progressive Conservative Party was reduced from 156 seats to two seats in the worst defeat ever suffered for a governing party at the federal level in Canada. The Tories were no longer recognized as an official caucus in the House of Commons since the required minimum number of seats for official party status is 12. As an example of the antipathy toward Mulroney, his former riding fell to the Bloc by a lopsided margin; the Tory candidate finished a distant third, with only 6,800 votes out of nearly 40,000 cast. The more right-wing Reform Party attracted alienated Western Canadian voters and replaced the PCs as the major conservative party in Canada; they won 52 seats and 18.7 percent of the popular vote, which was greater than the PCs (which won 16 percent of the popular vote). The Bloc replaced Mulroney's voting base in Quebec, becoming the Official Opposition (at 54 seats). In the election, Chrétien's Liberals won a substantial majority government. Mulroney claimed he was not responsible for the obliteration of the PCs, and instead blamed Campbell and her relationship with her boyfriend. In The Secret Mulroney Tapes, it was revealed Mulroney said of Campbell, "Throughout the whole goddam thing she's been screwing around with this Russian guy. The guy was sneaking into hotel rooms and the campaign bus"; he also said it was "the most incompetent campaign I've seen in my life." In the subsequent 1997 and 2000 elections, the Progressive Conservatives would continue being the smallest party in the House of Commons, holding on to fifth-place status though regaining official party status. In 2003, the party merged with Reform's successor, the Canadian Alliance, to create today's Conservative Party of Canada.

== After politics (1993–2024) ==
After leaving office, Mulroney served as an international business consultant and was a partner with the law firm Norton Rose. Until his death in 2024, he sat on the boards of directors of multiple corporations, including the Blackstone Group, Barrick Gold, Quebecor Inc., Archer Daniels Midland, Cendant Corp. (New York), AOL Latin America, Inc. (New York), Cognicase Inc. (Montreal) and Acreage Holdings, one of the largest vertically integrated cannabis companies in the United States. He was a senior counsellor to Hicks, Muse, Tate & Furst, a global private equity fund in Dallas, chairman of Forbes Global (New York), and was a paid consultant and lobbyist for Karl-Heinz Schreiber beginning in 1993. He was also chairman of various international advisory boards and councils for many international companies, including Power Corp. (Montreal), Bombardier (Montreal), the China International Trust and Investment Corp. (Beijing), J.P. Morgan Chase and Co. (New York), Violy, Byorum and Partners (New York), VS&A Communications Partners (New York), Independent Newspapers (Dublin) and General Enterprise Management Services Limited (British Virgin Islands).

In 1998, Mulroney was accorded Canada's highest civilian honour when he was made a Companion of the Order of Canada.

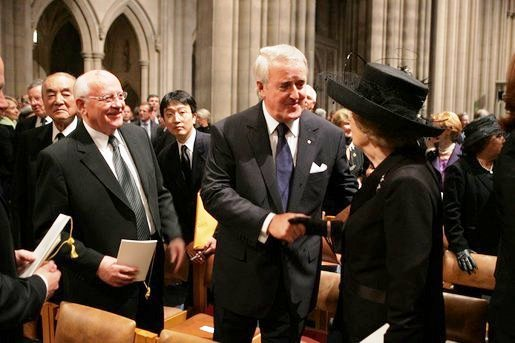
At the funeral of Ronald Reagan with former Soviet president Mikhail Gorbachev, former Japanese prime minister Yasuhiro Nakasone and former British prime minister Margaret Thatcher

In 2003, Mulroney received the Woodrow Wilson Award for Public Service from the Woodrow Wilson International Center for Scholars of the Smithsonian Institution at a ceremony in Montreal. The award was in recognition of his career in politics.

In January 2004, Mulroney delivered a keynote speech in Washington, D.C., celebrating the tenth anniversary of the North American Free Trade Agreement. In June 2004, Mulroney presented a eulogy for former U.S. president Ronald Reagan during the latter's state funeral. Two years later, at the request of Prime Minister Stephen Harper, Mulroney travelled to Washington, D.C., along with Michael Wilson, Canada's ambassador to the United States, as Canada's representatives at the state funeral of former president Gerald Ford.

In February 2005, as part of a physical examination, a CT scan revealed two small lumps in one of Mulroney's lungs. In his youth, Mulroney had been a heavy smoker. His doctors performed a biopsy, which ruled out cancer; incidentally, his surgery is sometimes cited as an example of the dangers of unnecessary testing. He recovered well enough to tape a speech for the Conservative Party of Canada's 2005 Policy Convention in Montreal in March, though he could not attend in person. He later developed pancreatitis, and he remained in hospital for several weeks. It was not until April 19 that his son, Ben Mulroney, announced he was recovering and would soon be released.

On September 12, 2005, veteran writer and former Mulroney confidant Peter C. Newman released The Secret Mulroney Tapes: Unguarded Confessions of a Prime Minister. Based largely on remarks from the former prime minister, which Newman had taped with Mulroney's knowledge, the book set off national controversy. Newman had been given unfettered access to Mulroney for a thorough biography and claims Mulroney did not honour an agreement to allow him access to confidential papers. This led Mulroney to respond at the annual Press Gallery Dinner in Ottawa on October 22, 2005, an event known for comedic speeches. The former prime minister appeared on tape and very formally acknowledged the various dignitaries and audience groups before delivering the shortest speech of the night: "Peter Newman: Go fuck yourself. Thank you, ladies and gentlemen, and good night."

In 2014, Mulroney became the chairman of Quebecor and defused tensions resulting from the continuing influence of former president and CEO Pierre Karl Péladeau.

On December 5, 2018, Mulroney delivered a eulogy for former U.S. president George H. W. Bush during his state funeral.

=== Airbus/Schreiber affair ===
On September 29, 1995, the Canadian Department of Justice, acting on behalf of the RCMP, sent a Letter of Request (LOR) to the Swiss government asking for information related to allegations that Mulroney was involved in a criminal conspiracy to defraud the Government of Canada. The investigation pertained to "improper commissions" allegedly paid to German-Canadian businessman Karlheinz Schreiber (or to companies controlled by him), Brian Mulroney and former Newfoundland premier Frank Moores in exchange for three government contracts. These contracts involved the purchase of Airbus Industrie aircraft by Air Canada; the purchase of helicopters by the Canadian Coast Guard from Messerschmitt-Bolkow-Blohm GmbH (MBB) in 1986; and the establishment of a manufacturing plant for Thyssen Light Armoured Vehicles (Bear Head Project) in Nova Scotia, a project which Mulroney as prime minister had cancelled.

This LOR "and its contents were to be kept confidential" but leaked to the media. As a result, Mulroney launched a $50-million libel lawsuit against the Government of Canada and the RCMP on November 20, 1995. On January 5, 1997, Mulroney agreed to an out-of-court settlement of $2.1 million with the Government of Canada and the RCMP. The Oliphant Commission Report in 2010 stated that Mulroney accepted $225,000 from Schreiber, and former justice minister Allan Rock said he would have used a different litigation strategy in the libel case had he known about these payments.

Mulroney did not disclose that he had received money from Schreiber (which Schreiber alleges was a total of $300,000 in three $100,000 instalments between 1993 and 1994, given to Mulroney under the code name "Britan" in brown paper envelopes or bags containing $1,000 bills during meetings in hotels). Later, on February 2, 1998, Schreiber met with Mulroney at Mulroney's invitation to the Savoy Hotel in Zurich, where, before a spread of smoked salmon and appetizers, Mulroney tried to get Schreiber to verify that nothing could connect Mulroney to the money. When further information was leaked to the public, Mulroney stated that there was nothing wrong with accepting envelopes of $1,000 bills (which he put into safes and safe deposit boxes without reporting it as taxable income for years after). The Oliphant Commission, presided over by Justice Jeffrey Oliphant, reported on May 31, 2010, that Mulroney "failed to live up to the standard of conduct that he himself adopted" in the 1995 ethics code. Oliphant said he could not accept Mulroney's testimony that his acceptance of $225,000 cash was an error in judgement. Rather, it was an attempt to hide the transactions.

=== Conservative Party of Canada ===
Mulroney played an influential role by supporting the merger of the Canadian Alliance (successor of the Reform Party) with the Progressive Conservatives to form the Conservative Party of Canada; Mulroney joined the new party upon its formation in 2003. This distinguished him from other prominent PC politicians, such as former prime ministers Joe Clark and Kim Campbell, who became independents as they believed that the Conservative Party was too right-wing and drifting toward social conservatism.

According to press reports, Mulroney's membership lapsed in 2006. In early 2009, Mulroney "called a high-ranking person in the party and asked that his name be removed from all party lists" due to his anger at the continued inquiry into his financial affairs, although he denied this claim. A Mulroney confidant, speaking on condition of anonymity, called the party's claims preposterous. "He's part of the history of this party; you can't rewrite history. If they're worried about branding, then shut the inquiry down. They're the ones who called the inquiry."

Months before the 2015 federal election, Mulroney endorsed Prime Minister Stephen Harper while campaigning for Eric Girard, a family friend and the Conservative candidate for Lac St. Louis. Mulroney campaigned for Conservative leader Erin O'Toole in the run-up to the 2021 Canadian election. Just over a month later, Mulroney criticized his handling of COVID-19 vaccinations, stating that he should show "leadership" and expel unvaccinated MPs from the Conservative caucus.

In June 2022, Mulroney said to an audience at Laval University that he could not see himself within the modern Conservative party. In October 2022, Mulroney said he supported the Conservatives' new leader, Pierre Poilievre, who reached out to Mulroney after his leadership victory. Mulroney said that he urged Poilievre to move closer to the political centre.

=== Other political interventions ===
In 2003, Mulroney criticized the Chrétien government's foreign policy. He expressed his disappointment with the Liberals strengthening relations with China, Russia, and Germany. Instead, he voiced his support for the United States, stating, "I want to stick with my old friends and allies." He also voiced his support for the Iraq War and said Canada would have supported the United States in Iraq if he were still prime minister.

Mulroney supported the Century Initiative, a group advocating that Canada grow its population to 100 million by 2100, which views population growth as important for economic growth, addressing an ageing workforce, and increasing global influence. The goal has drawn criticism over potential strains on infrastructure, housing, and services.

In June 2023, Mulroney praised Liberal Prime Minister Justin Trudeau's handling of negotiations over the United States–Mexico–Canada Agreement (USMCA) and the COVID-19 pandemic. Mulroney also criticized former US president Donald Trump, saying that he "was out to sabotage Canada."

=== Memoir ===
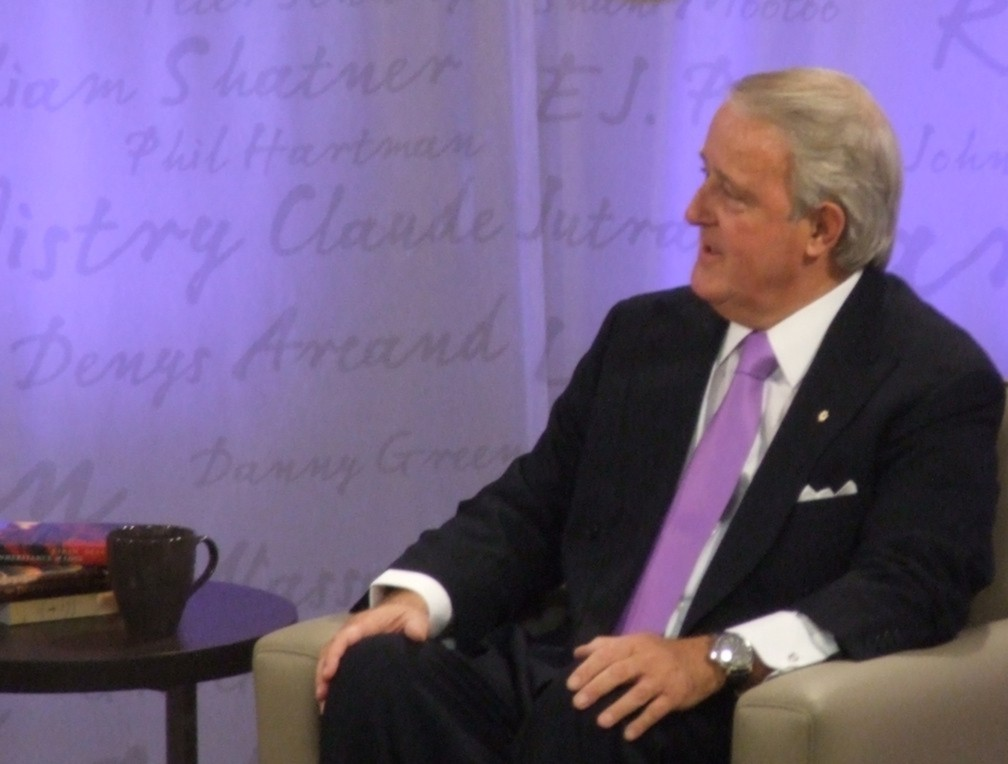
Mulroney appears during an interview with Heather Reisman, speaking about his memoirs.

Mulroney's Memoirs: 1939–1993 was released on September 10, 2007. Mulroney criticized Trudeau Sr. for avoiding military service in World War II and favourably referenced sources that describe the young Trudeau as holding anti-Semitic nationalist views and having an admiration for fascist dictators. Tom Axworthy, a prominent Liberal strategist, responded that Trudeau should be judged on his mature views. Historian, former MP and Trudeau biographer John English said, "I don't think it does any good to do this kind of historical ransacking to try to destroy reputations."

=== Death and state funeral ===
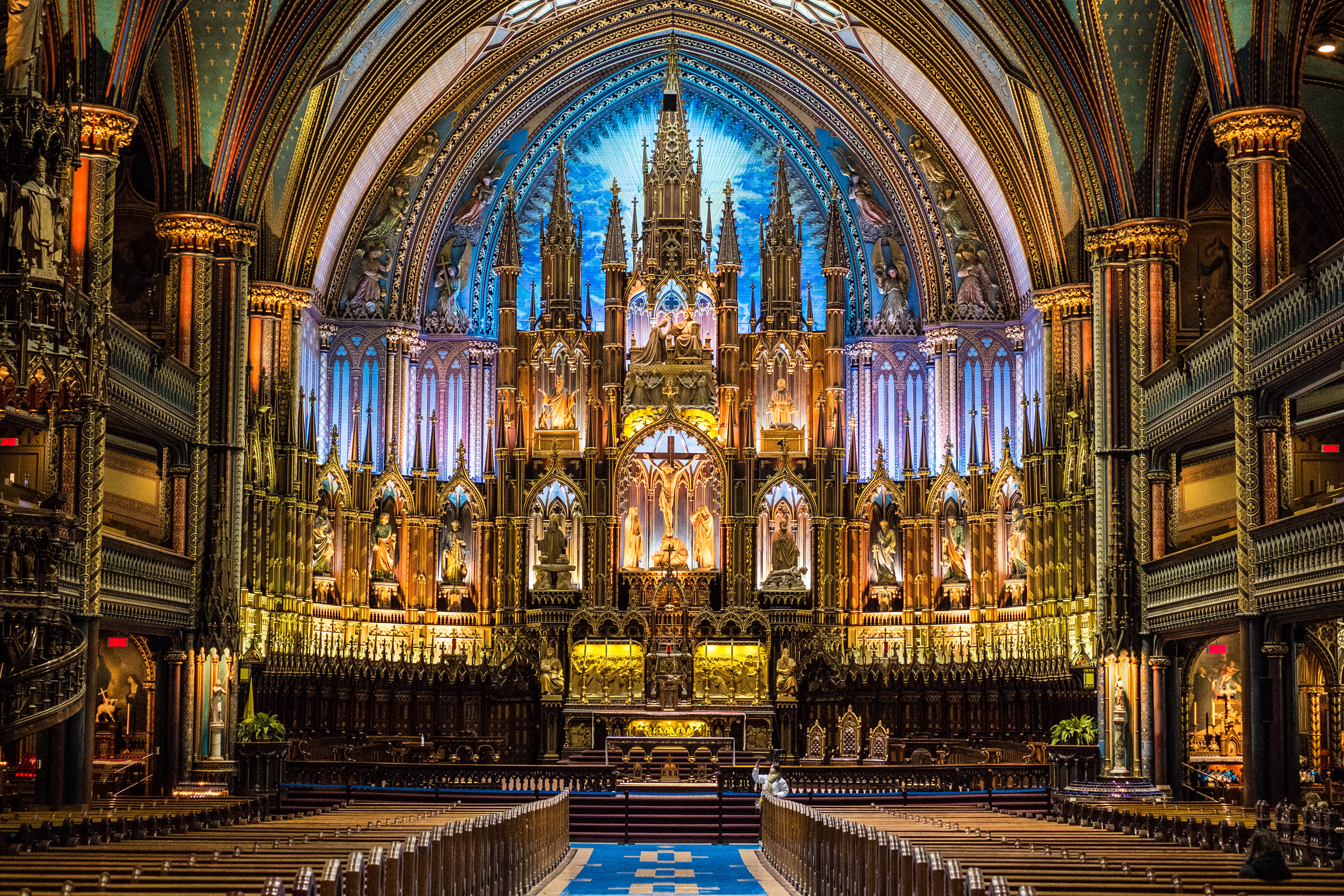
Notre-Dame Basilica interior

Mulroney had suffered several years of declining health leading up to his death. He underwent emergency surgery for an unspecified reason in December 2020. Reports spread in April 2023 that he was recovering from prostate cancer treatment. His daughter Caroline stated in August 2023 that her father's health was improving following this and a heart procedure in August. He had been hospitalized as a result of a fall at his home in Palm Beach, Florida, and died on February 29, 2024, at the age of 84.

His remains were repatriated on March 8, 2024, at Ottawa Macdonald–Cartier International Airport. A tribute in the House of Commons was held on March 18, after MPs agreed to suspend sitting. Mulroney lay in state at the Sir John A. Macdonald Building in Ottawa on March 19–20, before lying in repose at St. Patrick's Basilica, Montreal on March 21–22. His state funeral was held at the Notre-Dame Basilica on March 23, 2024. Honorary pallbearers included Derek Burney, Michel Cogger, Paul Desmarais, Jr., Yves Fortier, David Foster, former Mulroney press secretary Bill Fox, L. Ian MacDonald, Pierre Karl Péladeau, and Gérald Tremblay. The basilica's bell tolled 84 times to mark his age as his casket entered the basilica. Roman Catholic Archbishop of Montreal Christian Lépine conducted the funeral mass. Mulroney's daughter Caroline Mulroney offered a eulogy along with Justin Trudeau, James Baker, Jean Charest, Wayne Gretzky, and Pierre Karl Péladeau. Mulroney's recorded voice was also heard singing "We'll Meet Again" at the end of the service as mourners filed out of the basilica. A 19-gun salute in the Old Port of Montreal concluded the ceremony while the bell at Notre-Dame tolled 18 times in honour of the country's 18th prime minister. Among the guests were Mary Simon, Adrienne Clarkson, Michaëlle Jean, Justin Trudeau, Kim Campbell, Jean Chrétien, Joe Clark, Stephen Harper, Beverley McLachlin, Pierre Poilievre, Jagmeet Singh, Elizabeth May, Doug Ford, François Legault, Danielle Smith, Bob Rae, Pierre Marc Johnson, Lucien Bouchard, Jean Charest, Pauline Marois, and Philippe Couillard. International guests included Sarah, Duchess of York and John Major. Other prominent guests included Ryan Reynolds, Conrad Black, Galen Weston Jr., Heather Reisman, Edward S. Rogers III, Harley Finkelstein members of the Irving, Molson and Bronfman families, Rick Mercer, Serge Savard, Vincent Damphousse, Peter Mansbridge, Paul Arcand, Robert Fife, and Chantal Hébert. Mulroney was buried the same day at a private ceremony, at Notre Dame des Neiges Cemetery in Montreal.

== Legacy ==
Mulroney's legacy as prime minister is considered to be mixed. Mulroney made the case that his once-radical policies on the economy and free trade were not reversed by subsequent governments and regarded this as vindication. His deputy prime minister, Don Mazankowski, said that his greatest accomplishment would be seen as "dragging Canada kicking and screaming into the 21st century". His legacy in Canada is associated primarily with the 1989 Free Trade Agreement and the Goods and Services Tax (GST). Mulroney argued his government's economic policies helped the subsequent government eliminate the deficit. During his announcement of his intention to resign as prime minister, Mulroney responded to criticism of his policies: "I tried to do what I thought would be right for Canada in the long term, not what I thought would be politically popular in the short term." In The Secret Mulroney Tapes, it was revealed he said of his accomplishments: "You cannot name a Canadian prime minister who has done as many significant things as I did, because there are none."

Mulroney's intense unpopularity at the time of his resignation led many Conservative politicians to distance themselves from him for some years. His government had flirted with 10 percent approval ratings in the early 1990s when Mulroney's honesty and intentions were frequently questioned in the media, by Canadians in general, and by his political colleagues. In the 1993 election, the Progressive Conservative Party was reduced to two seats, which was seen as partially due to a backlash against Mulroney, as well as due to the fracturing of his "Grand Coalition." In the 1993 election, nearly all of the Tories' Western support shifted to Reform, which replaced the PCs as the major right-wing force in Canada. The Tories only won two seats west of Quebec in the next decade and kept remaining in fifth (last) place. The Canadian right was not reunited until the PCs merged with Reform's successor, the Canadian Alliance, in December 2003 to form the new Conservative Party of Canada.

In her memoirs, Time and Chance, and in her response in the National Post to The Secret Mulroney Tapes, Kim Campbell said that Mulroney left her with almost no time to salvage the Tories' reputation once the bounce from the leadership convention wore off. Campbell claimed Mulroney knew the Tories would be defeated regardless of who led them into the election and wanted a "scapegoat who would bear the burden of his unpopularity" rather than a true successor. In a 2019 interview with Maclean's, Campbell described Mulroney as "a pragmatist, not an ideologue." Former Ontario premier David Peterson, who supported both of Mulroney's attempts at constitutional reform while premier, told journalist Peter C. Newman of Mulroney, "I would never trust or respect him. He is a pathological liar. In fairness, I don't believe he knows he's lying ... Oh God, you couldn't take anything he said at face value. His essential Achilles heel is his baloney."

In 2006, Mulroney was named the "greenest" prime minister in Canadian history by a 12-member panel at an event organized by Corporate Knights magazine. Military historians Norman Hillmer and J. L. Granatstein ranked Mulroney eighth out of 20 among Canada's prime ministers in their 1999 book Prime Ministers: Ranking Canada's Leaders. In 2018, CAQ MNA and then Journal de Montreal journalist Sylvain Lévesque cited Mulroney as a political influence while criticizing Prime Minister Justin Trudeau's policies. That same year, former Bloc Québécois leader Michel Gauthier said he considered Mulroney to be the greatest prime minister of the last 50 years. In 2019, St. Francis Xavier University in Nova Scotia inaugurated the Brian Mulroney Institute of Government, a $100-million initiative designed to provide undergraduates with degrees in public policy and governance.

In 2026, he was the subject of Matthew Rankin's documentary film Ladies and Gentlemen, Brian Mulroney (Mesdames et Messieurs, Brian Mulroney), a collage film compiled from media clips of Mulroney and other figures to present a "gonzo" portrait of Mulroney's political and cultural impact. It premiered at the 2026 Toronto International Film Festival and won the Midnight Madness award.

== Supreme Court appointments ==
Mulroney chose the following jurists to be appointed by the Governor-in-Council to be puisne justices of the Supreme Court of Canada, one of whom, Beverley McLachlin, was subsequently elevated to chief justice of Canada:

- Gérard La Forest (January 16, 1985 – September 30, 1997)
- Claire L'Heureux-Dubé (April 15, 1987 – July 1, 2002)
- John Sopinka (May 24, 1988 – November 24, 1997)
- Charles Gonthier (February 1, 1989 – August 1, 2003)
- Peter Cory (February 1, 1989 – June 1, 1999)
- Beverley McLachlin (March 30, 1989 – December 15, 2017; subsequently appointed Chief Justice of Canada on the advice of Prime Minister Jean Chrétien, from January 7, 2000)
- William Stevenson (September 17, 1990 – June 5, 1992)
- Frank Iacobucci (January 7, 1991 – June 30, 2004)
- John C. Major (November 13, 1992 – December 25, 2005)

Mulroney also advised the appointment of Antonio Lamer as chief justice (July 1, 1990 – January 6, 2000). Lamer had been appointed a puisne justice on the advice of Prime Minister Pierre Trudeau on March 28, 1980.

== Honours ==
According to Canadian protocol, upon becoming prime minister, he was entitled to the style "The Right Honourable" for life.

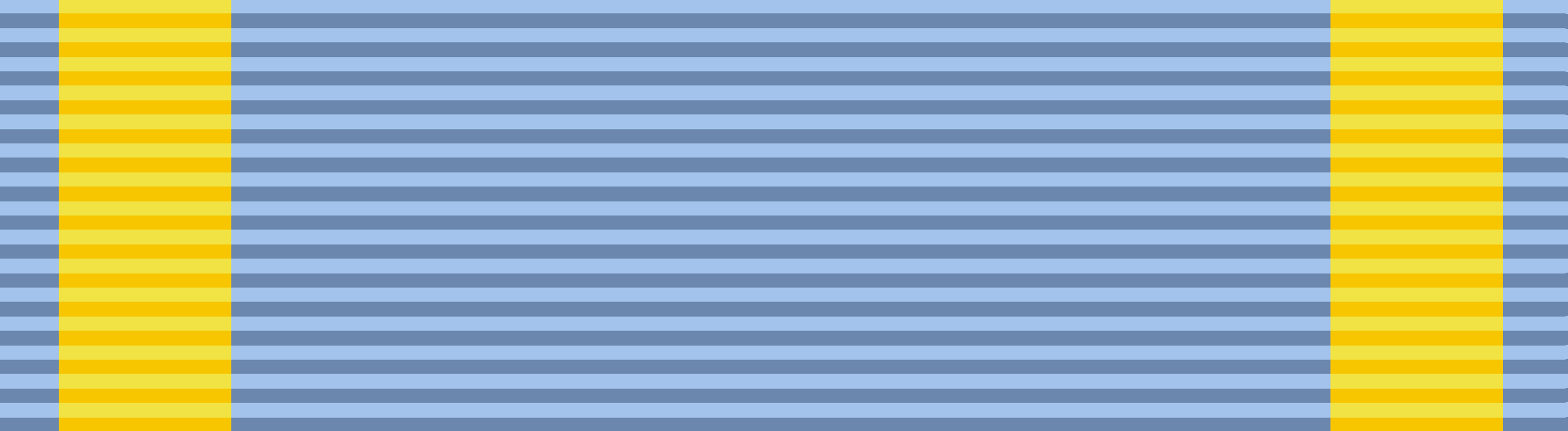

Ribbon	Description	Notes	Ref
	Grand Cross of the National Order of Honour and Merit (Haiti)	Awarded 1994; For "highest recognition for his leadership in vital matters affecting the nation" of Haiti.	
	Companion of the Order of Canada (C.C.)	Awarded on May 6, 1998; Invested on October 22, 1998	
	Grand Officer of the Ordre national du Québec	2002; Honouring "Quebec residents for conspicuous achievement in any field".	
	125th Anniversary of the Confederation of Canada Medal	1993; As the Prime Minister of Canada and an elected member of the House of Commons of Canada, the Right Honourable Brian Mulroney would be awarded the medal as a member of the Canadian order of precedence.	
	Queen Elizabeth II Golden Jubilee Medal for Canada	2002; As a former Prime Minister of Canada and having been awarded the Order of Canada, the Right Honourable Brian Mulroney was awarded the medal as a member of the Canadian order of precedence.	
	Queen Elizabeth II Diamond Jubilee Medal for Canada	2012; As a former Prime Minister of Canada and having been awarded the Order of Canada, the Right Honourable Brian Mulroney was awarded the medal as a member of the Canadian order of precedence.	
	Grand Cross with Collar of the Order of Kniaz Yaroslav the Wise (Ukraine)	2007; Awarded to Mulroney for cementing Canada as the first Western nation to recognize Ukrainian independence, only a day after declaration, in 1991.	
	Grand Cordon of the Order of the Rising Sun (Japan)	2011; Awarded for Mulroney's signing of the Japanese Canadian Redress Agreement, acknowledging the Canadian government's wrongful actions against the Japanese during the Second World War. His efforts to strengthen business relations between Japan and Canada in the 2000s also contributed to the award.	
	Supreme Companion of O. R. Tambo (Gold) (South Africa)	2015; Awarded for exceptional contribution to the liberation movement of South Africa (aiding to eliminate apartheid and free Nelson Mandela) as well as contributing to a non-racist, non-sexist, democratic and prosperous South Africa.	
	Commander of the National Order of the Legion of Honour (France)	2016; Awarded for service to France and the ideals it upholds. The award is primarily intended for French nationals, but is occasionally given to "foreign nationals".	

=== Honorary degrees ===
Brian Mulroney received several honorary degrees, including:

Location	Date	School	Degree
Newfoundland and Labrador	October 1980	Memorial University of Newfoundland	Doctor of Laws (LL.D.)
Maryland	May 21, 1992	Johns Hopkins University	Doctor of Humane Letters (DHL)
Connecticut	April 26, 1994	Central Connecticut State University	Doctor of Social Science (D.S.Sc)
Israel	1994	Tel Aviv University	Honorary Doctor of Philosophy
Missouri	May 1998	University of Missouri–St. Louis	Doctor of Laws (LL.D.)
Quebec	December 2005	Concordia University	Doctor of Laws (LL.D.)
Massachusetts	May 21, 2007	Boston College	Doctor of Laws (LL.D.)
Ontario	June 15, 2007	University of Western Ontario	Doctor of Laws (LL.D.)
Quebec	June 16, 2007	Université Laval	
Quebec	June 3, 2016	Université de Montréal	Unspecified Doctorate (PhD)
Quebec	June 6, 2017	McGill University	Doctor of Laws
New Brunswick	May 15, 2018	St. Thomas University	Unspecified Doctorate
Ontario	June 25, 2021	Ontario Tech University	Doctor of Laws

=== Order of Canada Citation ===
Mulroney was appointed a Companion of the Order of Canada on May 6, 1998. His citation reads:

As the eighteenth Prime Minister of Canada, he led the country for nine consecutive years. His accomplishments include, among others, the signing of the Free Trade Agreement with the United States, the North American Free Trade Agreement with Mexico and the United States, and the Acid Rain Treaty. In other international activities, he assumed the leadership of the Commonwealth countries against apartheid in South Africa and was appointed Co-chair of the United Nations' World Summit for Children. Fiscal reform, important environmental initiatives and employment equity were also highlights of his political career.

=== Other awards ===
In 2018, Mulroney was inducted into the Canadian Disability Hall of Fame and was awarded the George Bush Award for Excellence in Public Service.

== Coat of arms ==
Coat of arms of Brian Mulroney
Crest On a helmet mantled Azure doubled Or within a wreath of these colours issuant from a coronet érablé and flory Or a stone palace gate embattled comprising two Roman arches Azure and charged on the lintel with scales of justice Or. Escutcheon Azure on a pale Argent between four coronets érablé Or two and two a dexter hand appaumé and a maple leaf conjoined Gules the hand pointing towards chief the leaf towards base on a canton the Mark of the Prime Ministership of Canada (Argent four maple leaves conjoined in cross at the stem Gules). Supporters Two stallions Or crined and unguled Azure gorged with collars treflé on both edges Vert. Compartment On a grassy mound set with pine cones Or forming a bay rising above barry wavy Argent and Azure. Motto Multum In Amore Patriae Fides Multum Constantia

== See also ==
- List of prime ministers of Canada
- Mulroney: The Opera
- Ladies and Gentlemen, Brian Mulroney (Mesdames et Messieurs, Brian Mulroney)
- Shamrock Summit

== Footnotes ==
Parliament of Canada
Preceded by Elmer M. MacKay	Member of Parliament for Central Nova; 1983–1984	Succeeded by Elmer M. MacKay
Preceded by André Maltais	Member of Parliament for Manicouagan; 1984–1988	Succeeded by Charles Langlois
Preceded by Charles Hamelin	Member of Parliament for Charlevoix; 1988–1993	Succeeded by Gérard Asselin
Party political offices
Preceded by Erik Nielsen; Interim	Leader of the Progressive Conservative Party; 1983–1993	Succeeded by Kim Campbell
Political offices
Preceded by Erik Nielsen	Leader of the Opposition; 1983–1984	Succeeded by John Turner
Cabinet post (1)
Predecessor	Office	Successor
John Turner	Prime Minister of Canada; 1984–1993	Kim Campbell
Diplomatic posts
Preceded by Amintore Fanfani	Chair of the Group of Seven; 1988	Succeeded by François Mitterrand
