= Memoirs (Mulroney book) =

2007 memoir by Brian Mulroney

Memoirs: 1939–1993
- Book cover
- Author: Brian Mulroney
- Language: English; French
- Subject: Brian Mulroney
- Genre: Memoir
- Publisher: Douglas Gibson Books
- Publication date: September 10, 2007
- Publication place: Canada
- Media type: Hardcover
- Pages: 1152
- ISBN: 0-7710-6536-1
- Dewey Decimal: 971.064/7092 B 22
- LC Class: F1034.3.M85 M86 2007

Memoirs: 1939–1993 is a memoir written by the former Prime Minister of Canada Brian Mulroney. The book was released on September 10, 2007 and outlines Mulroney's version of events during his early life, political career and time as prime minister.

== CTV and TVA interviews ==
CTV broadcast a documentary on Brian Mulroney on the eve of his book launch. The network claimed Triumph & Treachery: The Brian Mulroney Story, a 90-minute special September 9, 2007, was the most complete interview the former prime minister had ever given and his first comprehensive interview since leaving office in 1993. The Quebec French language TVA network aired a similar documentary exclusively in French later that night.

== Criticism of Trudeau ==
Mulroney allocates a fair amount of text commenting on his antagonist, the late former Prime Minister Pierre Elliot Trudeau. Mulroney believes that Trudeau lacked the moral fibre to be Prime Minister for not serving in the Canadian Forces during World War II.

Pierre Trudeau was not among them. That's a decision he made. He's entitled to make that kind of decision. But it doesn't qualify him for any position of moral leadership in our society.

— Mulroney

Mulroney hints that he feels the young Trudeau had anti-Semitic leanings at that time, stating: "This is a man who questioned the Allies when the Jews were being sacrificed and when the great extermination program was on, he was marching around Outremont, Quebec on the other side of the issue."

Mulroney also blames Trudeau for scuttling the Meech Lake accord, the 1990 pact aimed at securing Quebec's signature on the Constitution of Canada.

=== Response ===
Stéphane Dion responded to Mulroney critiques with a five-paragraph statement posted on the Liberal Party website, "It is regrettable that, after attending prime minister Trudeau’s state funeral and praising him as 'an exceptional individual who served his country effectively and well … a gallant political warrior who loved his country,' Mr. Mulroney would seem to be at such odds with his own views."

Tom Axworthy's, response to Mulroney was that Trudeau should be judged by his actions once his values matured and he entered public life, not by "ridiculous" thoughts he entertained briefly in his teens and early twenties.

John English stated that Trudeau's youthful views must be put in the context of a time when most Quebecers were so virulently anti-British and opposed to what they saw as a British war that they were blinded to the evils of Hitler's Nazism.
