= Labour-sponsored venture capital corporation =

Canadian corporations with specific tax benefits

A labour-sponsored venture capital corporation (LSVCC), known alternately as labour-sponsored investment fund (LSIF) or simply retail venture capital (RVC), is a fund managed by investment professionals that invests in small to mid-sized Canadian companies. The Canadian federal government and some provincial governments offer tax credits to LSVCC investors to promote the growth of such companies.

== History ==
The idea behind LSVCCs was first proposed in the Canadian province of Quebec in 1982. The province was in the midst of a recession and the lack of capital in small and mid-sized companies had caused numerous bankruptcies.

In response, the Quebec Federation of Labour proposed a Solidarity Fund at a provincial economic summit conference in 1982 to help the province create a locally controlled healthy and sustainable economy. The intention was to attract venture capital to smaller Quebec firms.

This new type of fund slowly began to spread across the rest of Canada during the 1980s. But it wasn't until the late 1990s that LSVCCs became truly noteworthy outside Quebec, thanks in equal part to generous tax breaks from federal and provincial governments and attractive returns to investors. So far in the 2000s, returns have been less impressive, due in part to the bursting of the technology bubble. Returns for LSVCCs have generally been stagnant. Speculation about the reasons for low returns point to risky ventures, inexperienced fund managers, lack of requirement to generate positive returns to be competitive, and government intervention.

Labour-sponsored venture capital corporations, as the name suggests, must be "sponsored" by a labour union. This sponsor is able to appoint members to the fund's board of directors (but not the investee's board of directors).

== Companies invested in ==
LSVCC funds invest primarily in small and medium-sized private companies who require funding to sustain and increase growth. The emergence of the LSVCC industry stems from the idea that the growth of these firms will stimulate the Canadian economy and create jobs.

The money investors put into these firms is a form of venture capital. These firms are just starting out and generally aren't listed on a stock exchange such as the Toronto Stock Exchange. LSVCCs offer an asset class that is normally not accessible through conventional investment vehicles. These companies have potential for substantial growth and high returns down the line if they succeed and are generally chosen precisely for that growth potential.

In an LSVCC, as in any mutual fund, investors' money is distributed among a number of businesses. However, because the companies invested in by LSVCCs may be new and are likely small, many don't have much of a track record and can be risky investments by themselves. Ideally, an LSVCC can reduce that risk by diversifying their portfolio of assets.

These small to mid-sized companies are interested in receiving financing from LSVCC fund companies because they are in a high growth cycle and are looking to further support the expansion of their business. These companies are often too small or too young to secure conventional bank financing. The LSVCC fund companies are also able to provide sought-after strategic guidance and operational support.

== Tax credits ==
To encourage Canadian retail investors to invest in LSVCCs, the federal government and some provincial governments offer tax credits. The 2016 Canadian federal budget restored the federal LSVCC credit to 15% for purchases of provincially (not federally) registered LSVCCs for the 2016 and later taxation years. Prior to 2015, the federal government had offered investors in LSVCCs a 15% tax credit on a maximum investment amount of $5,000 per year – worth up to $750. That credit was reduced to 10% for 2015, 5% for 2016, and was to be eliminated for 2017 and later years.

According to the Department of Finance, the federal LSVCC program has not had the same positive impact as the provincial programs, so the federal LSVCC credit for federally registered LSVCCs will remain at 5% for 2016 and will be eliminated for 2017 and later years; see the 2016 federal budget.

Some provinces offer a tax credit, often 15%, in addition to the federal credits. An additional 5% tax credit was formerly available to Ontario investors who purchased certain research-oriented LSVCC – a kind of specialty LSVCC dealing mostly in research-oriented small companies.

The Ontario government has phased out the labour-sponsored funds tax credit. As of January 1, 2012, the credit is no longer available from the Ontario government.

When an investor buys an LSVCC in their RRSP, they obtain the LSVCC tax credits as well as the usual tax deduction they receive each time they contribute to their RRSP.

== Realizing gains ==
Gains made in the value of LSVCCs occur in one of three ways:

- Selling the investment in a company to a larger company (often in the same industry) by way of mergers and acquisitions.
- Exiting from an investment in a company via an initial public offering.
- Capital appreciation in currently held investments in a company.

LSVCC fund companies tend to use their investment in a company to buy an equity stake. They will also negotiate to have members of their portfolio management team hold positions on the board of directors of companies they invest in. This allows them to have some say in future decisions that that company makes in regards to company strategy and execution.

LSVCC funds have holding periods because of the time it takes for these small companies to meet the criteria necessary for one of the above-mentioned options. Even though the holding period is an extended period of time, the LSVCC fund company doesn't wish to retain any investment indefinitely. The primary objective of LSVCC fund managers is to obtain a superior rate of return through an eventual and timely disposition of each investment.

== Common characteristics ==
Holding period
To retain the tax credit an investor has to hold on to the shares for a set time period, often eight years. If shares are sold before this time, the amount received in tax credits may need to be repaid to the government in what's termed tax credit clawback.
Liquidity
Because of the nature of the holding period (often eight years), LSVCC shares usually can't be redeemed without paying penalty charges until the holding period is complete. Because of this decreased liquidity as compared with other investment instruments, LSVCCs are best for investors with longer time horizons who are able to hold their shares for the full holding period.
Valuation
Like tradition LP-based venture capital funds, LSVCCs don't generally invest in publicly traded firms. With a stock that's publicly traded, the price that is quoted when the market closes is influenced by the opinions of investors, analysts and other market participants who have studied the company issuing the stock. Whereas LSVCC funds invest in private companies whose worth tends to be more difficult to assess and to determine.
Risk
LSVCC fund companies are able to diversify their portfolio by investing in a relatively large number of firms thus decreasing overall risk. But this only holds to a certain degree. The companies have little track record and most are not publicly traded. Some will fail; others will stagnate. It’s the few that thrive that ideally provide the profit that makes up for the other losses.

== Criticism ==
Government funds have come under criticism from non-Canadian sources for their relatively poor performance, as some of these funds lagged equity indices in the U.S. and Canada. Additionally, some government funds have been alleged to compete with private investment, potentially affecting the development of new companies in areas where they operate.

== Major LSVCC venture capital firms ==
- Fonds de solidarité FTQ
- Fondaction
- GrowthWorks Capital
