= Canadian federal budget =

The Canadian federal budget is presented annually by the Government of Canada to identify planned government spending and expected government revenue, and to forecast economic conditions for the upcoming fiscal year. Federal budgets are presented in the fall by the minister of finance. Before 2025, federal budgets were released in the spring.

== Budget process ==
The budget is announced in the House of Commons by the minister of finance, who traditionally wears new shoes while doing so. The budget is then voted on by the House of Commons. Budgets are a confidence measure, and if the House votes against it the government can fall, as happened to Prime Minister Joe Clark's government in 1980. The governing party strictly enforces party discipline, usually expelling from the party caucus any government member of Parliament (MP) who votes against the budget. Opposition parties almost always vote against the budget. In cases of minority government, the government has normally had to include major concessions to one of the smaller parties to ensure passage of the budget.

Historically the Official Opposition used to prepare a complete alternative budget and present it along with the main budget. In recent years, opposition parties are more likely to pick only certain aspects to criticize. The Reform Party revived this practice for a time, however. A complete alternative budget is today produced each year by the Canadian Centre for Policy Alternatives, a non-partisan think-tank.

Traditionally, the budget process was immensely secretive with little consultation. Under Prime Minister Louis St. Laurent, the minister of finance famously would type the entire budget himself so that no secretary could read it. This secrecy was felt to be needed for inside information could enable individuals to profit from upcoming government decisions. The secrecy also had a large political component, as it would help undermine the response by the opposition.

Under Prime Minister Jean Chrétien and his Finance Minister Paul Martin, this changed considerably. Most of the budget would be released well before its announcement, especially any major changes so as to get feedback from the populace and the market.

The process of creating the budget is a complex one which begins within the working ranks for the federal government. Each year, the various departments that make up the government submit what are called 'Main Estimates' to the Treasury Board of Canada Secretariat (TBS). These documents identify the planned expenditure of each department, linking these proposed expenses to programs, to objectives and ultimately to the priorities of the current ruling government. TBS combines these budget estimates and compiles an initial proposed budget. From there, Cabinet and the Prime Minister's Office adjust the budget based on a series of economic, social and political factors. In reality, decisions are usually made with the primary intent of re-election and so often include advantages for key regions and lobby groups.

Following the budget, Parliament will pass an appropriation act (called the interim supply) which will allow individual departments to spend 3/12th of their annual budget. This partial authority enables Parliament to spend more time in examining the Estimates documents. In June, Parliament appropriates the full supply. Under Prime Minister Mark Carney, budgets began being tabled in the fall, with an economic statement in the spring.

== Summary of budgets ==
Budget (Unofficial) Subtitle	Fiscal year	Tabled on	Minister of Finance	Initial Budget Implementation Act					Ministry
Budget (Unofficial) Subtitle	Fiscal year	Tabled on	Minister of Finance	Bill	Fate	Votes for (Note: Votes presented are those of the latest reading in the House of Commons)	Vote against	Paired votes	Ministry
1988 Canadian federal budget None (Note: All budgets tabled during the 33rd Canadian Parliament had the subtitle Securing Economic Renewal on their cover page.)	1988–89	10 February 1988	Michael Wilson; PC						24 (Mulroney)
1989 Canadian federal budget None	1989–90	27 April 1989	Michael Wilson; PC						24 (Mulroney)
1990 Canadian federal budget None	1990–91	20 February 1990	Michael Wilson; PC						24 (Mulroney)
1991 Canadian federal budget None	1991–92	26 February 1990	Michael Wilson; PC						24 (Mulroney)
1992 Canadian federal budget None	1992–93	25 February 1992	Don Mazankowski; PC						24 (Mulroney)
1993 Canadian federal budget None	1993–94	26 April 1993	Don Mazankowski; PC	C-9	✓ Royal Assent (12 May 1994)	Adopted on division			24 (Mulroney)
1994 Canadian federal budget None	1994–95	22 February 1994	Paul Martin; Liberal	C-17	✓ Royal Assent (15 June 1994)	137 / 228 (60%)	91 / 228 (40%)	16	26 (Chrétien)
1995 Canadian federal budget None	1995–96	27 February 1995	Paul Martin; Liberal	C-76	✓ Royal Assent (22 June 1995)	141 / 226 (62%)	85 / 226 (38%)	28	26 (Chrétien)
1996 Canadian federal budget Securing the Future	1996–97	6 March 1996	Paul Martin; Liberal	C-31	✓ Royal Assent (22 June 1995)	115 / 169 (68%)	54 / 169 (32%)	60	26 (Chrétien)
1997 Canadian federal budget Building the Future for Canadians	1997–98	18 February 1997	Paul Martin; Liberal	C-93	✓ Royal Assent (27 April 1997)	109 / 160 (68%)	51 / 160 (32%)	30	26 (Chrétien)
1998 Canadian federal budget A Strong Economy and a Secure Society	1998–99	24 February 1998	Paul Martin; Liberal	C-36	✓ Royal Assent (18 June 1998)	142 / 237 (60%)	95 / 237 (40%)	12	26 (Chrétien)
1999 Canadian federal budget Building today for a better tomorrow	1999–00	16 February 1999	Paul Martin; Liberal	C-71	✓ Royal Assent (17 June 1999)	142 / 219 (65%)	77 / 219 (35%)	20	26 (Chrétien)
2000 Canadian federal budget Better finances, better lives	2000–01	28 February 2000	Paul Martin; Liberal	C-32	✓ Royal Assent (6 June 2000)	137 / 233 (59%)	96 / 233 (41%)	4	26 (Chrétien)
2001 Canadian federal budget Securing progress in an uncertain world	2002–03	10 December 2001	Paul Martin; Liberal	C-49	✓ Royal Assent (27 March 2002)	127 / 193 (66%)	66 / 193 (34%)	–	26 (Chrétien)
2003 Canadian federal budget Building the Canada We Want	2003–04	18 February 2003	John Manley; Liberal	C-28	✓ Royal Assent (19 June 2003)	147 / 244 (60%)	97 / 244 (40%)	18	26 (Chrétien)
2004 Canadian federal budget New Agenda for Achievement	2004–05	23 March 2004	Ralph Goodale; Liberal	C-30	✓ Royal Assent (14 June 2004)	124 / 208 (60%)	84 / 208 (40%)	8	27 (Martin)
2005 Canadian federal budget Delivering on Commitments	2005–06	23 February 2005	Ralph Goodale; Liberal	C-43	✓ Royal Assent (29 June 2005)	242 / 296 (82%)	54 / 296 (18%)	–	27 (Martin)
2006 Canadian federal budget Focusing on Priorities	2006–07	2 May 2006	Jim Flaherty; Conservative	C-4	✓ Royal Assent (22 June 2006)	Bill adopted without dissent			28 (Harper)
2007 Canadian federal budget Aspire to a Stronger, Safer, Better Canada	2007–08	19 March 2007	Jim Flaherty; Conservative	C-52	✓ Royal Assent (22 June 2007)	156 / 257 (61%)	101 / 257 (39%)	10	28 (Harper)
2008 Canadian federal budget Responsible Leadership	2008–09	26 February 2008	Jim Flaherty; Conservative	C-50	✓ Royal Assent (18 June 2008)	120 / 210 (57%)	90 / 210 (43%)	12	28 (Harper)
2009 Canadian federal budget Canada's Economic Action Plan	2009–10	7 January 2009	Jim Flaherty; Conservative	C-10	✓ Royal Assent (12 March 2009)	204 / 282 (72%)	78 / 282 (28%)	12	28 (Harper)
2010 Canadian federal budget Leading the Way on Jobs and Growth	2010–11	4 March 2010	Jim Flaherty; Conservative	C-12	✓ Royal Assent (12 July 2010)	138 / 264 (52%)	126 / 264 (48%)	6	28 (Harper)
2011 Canadian federal budget A Low-Tax Plan for Jobs and Growth	2011–12	22 March 2011	Jim Flaherty; Conservative	—N/a	✗ Never adopted	40th Parliament dissolved before vote			28 (Harper)
2011 Canadian federal budget A Low-Tax Plan for Jobs and Growth	2011–12	6 June 2011	Jim Flaherty; Conservative	C-3	✓ Royal Assent (26 June 2011)	158 / 291 (54%)	133 / 291 (46%)	–	28 (Harper)
2012 Canadian federal budget Jobs, Growth and Long-Term Prosperity	2012–13	29 March 2012	Jim Flaherty; Conservative	C-19	✓ Royal Assent (29 June 2012)	158 / 293 (54%)	135 / 293 (46%)	–	28 (Harper)
2013 Canadian federal budget Jobs, Growth and Long-Term Prosperity	2013–14	21 March 2013	Jim Flaherty; Conservative	C-33	✓ Royal Assent (26 June 2013)	153 / 272 (56%)	119 / 272 (44%)	–	28 (Harper)
2014 Canadian federal budget The Road to Balance	2014–15	11 February 2014	Jim Flaherty; Conservative	C-31	✓ Royal Assent (19 June 2014)	148 / 242 (61%)	94 / 242 (39%)	–	28 (Harper)
2015 Canadian federal budget Strong Leadership	2015–16	21 April 2015	Joe Oliver; Conservative	C-15	✓ Royal Assent (23 June 2015)	150 / 266 (56%)	116 / 266 (44%)	–	28 (Harper)
2016 Canadian federal budget Growing the Middle Class	2016–17	22 March 2016	Bill Morneau; Liberal	C-15	✓ Royal Assent (22 June 2016)	171 / 300 (57%)	129 / 300 (43%)	–	29 (J. Trudeau)
2017 Canadian federal budget Building a Strong Middle Class	2017–18	22 March 2017	Bill Morneau; Liberal	C-44	✓ Royal Assent (22 June 2017)	162 / 289 (56%)	127 / 289 (44%)	–	29 (J. Trudeau)
2018 Canadian federal budget Equality + Growth	2018–19	27 February 2018	Bill Morneau; Liberal	C-74	✓ Royal Assent (21 June 2018)	159 / 280 (57%)	121 / 280 (43%)	–	29 (J. Trudeau)
2019 Canadian federal budget Investing in the Middle Class	2019–20	19 March 2019	Bill Morneau; Liberal	C-97	✓ Royal Assent (21 June 2019)	157 / 252 (62%)	97 / 252 (38%)	2	29 (J. Trudeau)
~~2020 Canadian federal budget~~	2020–21	—N/a			✗ Never presented	Postponed and combined into the following year's budget due to the COVID-19 pandemic			29 (J. Trudeau)
2021 Canadian federal budget A Recovery Plan for Jobs, Growth, and Resilience	2021–22	19 April 2021	Chrystia Freeland; Liberal	C-30	✓ Royal Assent (29 June 2021)	211 / 332 (64%)	121 / 332 (36%)	–	29 (J. Trudeau)
2022 Canadian federal budget A Plan to Grow Our Economy and Make Life More Affordable	2022–23	7 April 2022	Chrystia Freeland; Liberal	C-19	✓ Royal Assent (23 June 2022)	202 / 317 (64%)	115 / 317 (36%)	12	29 (J. Trudeau)
2023 Canadian federal budget A Made-in-Canada Plan: Strong Middle Class, Affordable Economy, Healthy Future	2023–24	28 March 2023	Chrystia Freeland; Liberal	C-47	✓ Royal Assent (22 June 2023)	177 / 323 (55%)	146 / 323 (45%)	2	29 (J. Trudeau)
2024 Canadian federal budget Fairness for every generation	2024–25	16 April 2024	Chrystia Freeland; Liberal	C-69	✓ Royal Assent (20 June 2024)	173 / 323 (54%)	150 / 323 (46%)	2	29 (J. Trudeau)
2025 Canadian federal budget Canada Strong	2025–26	4 November 2025	François-Philippe Champagne; Liberal	C-15	✓ Royal Assent (17 November 2025)	170 / 343 (50%)	168 / 343 (49%)	0	30 (Carney)
2026 Canadian federal budget Masters of Our Destiny	2026–27	5 November 2026	François-Philippe Champagne; Liberal						30 (Carney)

== See also ==
- Taxation in Canada
- Canadian public debt

International:

- Government budget by country
