= Health and Welfare Canada =

The Department of National Health and Welfare (NHW), commonly known as Health and Welfare Canada, was a Canadian federal department established in 1944.

Its advisory body on welfare was the National Council of Welfare. In June 1993, Prime Minister Kim Campbell split the department into two separate entities: Health Canada and Human Resources and Labour Canada (later Human Resources Development Canada).

== History ==
Canada's original Department of Health was created in 1919. It would merge with the Department of Soldiers' Civil Re-establishment in 1928 to form the Department of Pensions and National Health. Soon after, the Department of National Health and Welfare would be established in 1944.

Following the 1992 federal budget the department was tasked with administering the newly created Child Tax Benefit and of the Children's Special Allowances programs.

In June 1993, Prime Minister Kim Campbell split the department into two separate entities: the portfolio related to health would form Health Canada, while social-development and income-security programs (i.e., the 'welfare' side) would form Human Resources and Labour Canada—which also combined Labour Canada, the employment programs of Employment and Immigration Canada, and the social-development and education programs from the Secretary of State. Within a few months, a new government was elected, after which Human Resources and Labour became known as Human Resources Development Canada.

In June 1996, a few weeks before the abolition of the department, the Food Inspection Activities under the Food and Drugs Act were transferred to Agriculture and Agri-Food Canada. (Note: The following year all the activities related to the safeguarding of food, plants, and animals would be transferred to the newly created Canadian Food Inspection Agency.)

== Mandate, structure and programs ==
The department was tasked with the administration of laws and programs relating to the promotion of health, social security and welfare in Canada. It was notably in charge of administering the Canada Assistance Plan and the Established Programs Financing (Note: Excepted the Post-Secondary Education portion administrated by the Secretary of State.) transfer programs to the provinces.

As of 31 March 1967 the department oversaw a wide variety of programs and activities, structured around multiple branches:

- Food and Drugs Branch: surveillance activities under the Food and Drugs Act, the Proprietary or Patent Medicine Act and the Narcotic Control Act;
- Health Services Branch: provision of consultant and advisory services to the provinces;
- Health Insurance and Resources Branch: administration of federal-provincials programs;
- Medical Services Branch: provision of medical services to specific populations (quarantine, immigration, civil servants, certain registered Indians);
- Welfare Branch: administration of the federal welfare programs (CPP, OAS and GIS, family and youth allowances, unemployment assistance) and of the Fitness and Amateur Sport program.

The department also oversaw multiple federal agencies and boards:

- Dominion Council of Health
- Medical Research Council
- National Council of Welfare

== Ministers of Health and Welfare ==
No.	Minister	Term	Ministry
1.	Brooke Claxton	October 18, 1944 - December 11, 1946	under Prime Minister William Lyon Mackenzie King
2.	Paul Martin Sr.	December 12, 1946 - November 15, 1948	under Prime Minister William Lyon Mackenzie King
2.	Paul Martin Sr.	November 15, 1948 - June 20, 1957	under Prime Minister Louis Stephen St. Laurent
*	Alfred Johnson Brooks (Acting)	June 21, 1957 - August 21, 1957	under Prime Minister John Diefenbaker
3.	Jay Waldo Monteith	August 22, 1957 - April 21, 1963	under Prime Minister John Diefenbaker
4.	Judy LaMarsh	April 22, 1963 - December 17, 1965	under Prime Minister Lester Bowles Pearson
5.	Allan MacEachen	December 18, 1965 - April 19, 1968	under Prime Minister Lester Bowles Pearson
5.	Allan MacEachen	April 20, 1968 - July 5, 1968	under Prime Minister Pierre Elliott Trudeau
6.	John C. Munro	July 6, 1968 - November 26, 1972	under Prime Minister Pierre Elliott Trudeau
7.	Marc Lalonde	November 27, 1972 - September 17, 1977	under Prime Minister Pierre Elliott Trudeau
8.	Monique Bégin	September 18, 1977 - June 3, 1979	under Prime Minister Pierre Elliott Trudeau
9.	David Edward Crombie	June 4, 1979 - March 2, 1980	under Prime Minister Joe Clark
	Monique Bégin (2nd time)	March 3, 1980 - June 29, 1984	under Prime Minister Pierre Elliott Trudeau
	Monique Bégin (2nd time)	June 30, 1984 - September 16, 1984	under Prime Minister John Turner
10.	Jake Epp	September 17, 1984 - January 29, 1989	under Prime Minister Brian Mulroney
11.	Perrin Beatty	January 30, 1989 - April 20, 1991	under Prime Minister Brian Mulroney
12.	Benoît Bouchard	April 21, 1991 - June 24, 1993	under Prime Minister Brian Mulroney
13.	Mary Collins	June 25, 1993 - November 3, 1993	under Prime Minister Kim Campbell
14.	Diane Marleau	November 4, 1993 - January 24, 1996	under Prime Minister Jean Chrétien
15.	David Dingwall	January 25, 1996 - July 11, 1996	under Prime Minister Jean Chrétien

== See also ==
=== Related articles ===
- Healthcare in Canada
  - Health Canada
- Welfare in Canada
  - Canada Assistance Plan
  - Canada Health and Social Transfer
  - National Council of Welfare

=== Further reading ===
- Department of National Health and Welfare Act, R.S.C. 1985, c. N-10
- Health and Welfare Canada and Department of Finance. 1982. Better Pensions for Canadians (green paper).
- Collishaw, Neil. 2009. "History of tobacco control in Canada." Physicians for a Smoke-Free Canada.
- National Capital Alliance on Race Relations vs. Canada (Health and Welfare): A Case Study
- https://web.archive.org/web/20120505032106/http://canadiansocialresearch.net/welref.htm
- https://web.archive.org/web/20130524112429/http://www.statcan.gc.ca/pub/11-516-x/sectionc/4057749-eng.htm
