= 1996 Canadian federal budget =

Third government spending plan under Paul Martin

1996 Budget of the Canadian Federal Government Securing the Future
- Presented: 6 March 1996
- Country: Canada
- Parliament: 35th
- Party: Liberal
- Finance minister: Paul Martin
- Total revenue: 149.889 billion
- Total expenditures: 158.608 billion
- Deficit: $8.719 billion

The Canadian federal budget for fiscal year 1996–97 was presented by Minister of Finance Paul Martin in the House of Commons of Canada on 6 March 1996. It is the first Canadian federal budget that was identified with an unofficial subtitle: Securing the Future. (Note: Unlike in future budgets the subtitle is not displayed on the cover page of budget documents but as the first title of the budget speech.)

== Taxes ==
=== Personal income taxes ===
Incentives for investments in Labour-sponsored venture capital corporation (LSVCCs) are tightened:

- The tax credit rate is cut to 15% from 20%;
- The maximum yearly credit is cut from $1,000 to $525;
- Minimum holding periods to benefit from the LSVCCs credit is increased from 5 to 8 years.

The budget proposes to remove the 7-year limit on the carry-forward of unused RRSP room. Limits for RRSP contributions are frozen until 2003 and legislated through 2005, and the age limit for contributions is to be reduced from 71 to 69.

The maximum amount of the Working Income Supplement (WIS) was increased to $750 in July 1997 and $1,000 in July 1998.

==== Child Support Payments tax treatment ====
Child support payments prescribed by court orders or agreements made after 30 April 1997 will no longer be deductible for the payer and included in the income of the recipient. Most payments made under agreements made before 1 May 1997 are not affected (under certain conditions). Spousal support payments are not affected by the change. The measure is hailed by the Official Opposition.

==== Student Assistance Measures ====
The budget announced several enhancements to measures assisting higher-education students:

- The Education Tax Credit was increased by 25% (from $80 to $100 per month);
- The limit on the amount of the Tuition Tax Credit that can be transferred if unused is raised from $680 to $850;
- RESP annual contribution limit is raised from $1,500 to $2,000 and the lifetime limit from $31,500 to $42,000;
- Single parents studying full-time will be allowed to claim the child care expenses deduction against any type of income. Full-time attendance in high school will also be recognized.

=== Corporate taxes ===
The budget extends the capital surtax (Note: Designated as a surcharge on the capital tax legislated in the Part VI of the Income Tax Act.) on banks by a year (until 31 October 1997) and life insurance companies by 3 years (until the end of 1998).

== Expenditures ==
=== Program spending ===
The budget announced further $1.9 billion cuts to program spending by 1998-99. Cumulative expenditures reductions for the period 1994-95 to 1998-99 are expected to amount to $79 billions. Most notably:

- Federal departments are expected to deliver 3.5% in efficiency savings;
- CMHC programs related to social housing (except on reserves) are phased out; (Note: Funding for new social housing units had already been frozen since 1993.)
- Defense spending is cut by $200 and $600 millions in 1997-98 and 1998-99 respectively;
- The International Assistance Envelope is cut by $150 million in 1998-99;
- Government subsidies are further cut:
  - The dairy subsidy is to be eliminated over 5 years;
  - The postal subsidy for periodicals and magazines is cut by 18%;
  - Via Rail and Atomic Energy of Canada Limited's budgets are also curtailed.

The governments also commits to further privatizations and improve commercialization of federal operations. Alternative service delivery is also announced with three new service agencies to be set up:

- A Single Food Inspection Agency to combine services provided by 3 separate federal departments (Note: Namely Agriculture and Agri-Food Canada, Fisheries and Oceans Canada and Health Canada.) in the domain that will result in the creation of the Canadian Food Inspection Agency;
- A Canada Revenue Commission that will ultimately result in the creation of the Canada Customs and Revenue Agency (CCRA) in 1999;
- And the Parks Canada Agency.

=== Transfers to provinces ===
The previous budget introduced the Canada Health and Social Transfer (CHST) which replaced both the Established Programs Financing and the Canada Assistance Plan fiscal transfers.

The 1996 budget announced long-term funding for the CHST:

- CHST yearly entitlements are to be frozen at $25.1 billion until 1999-2000;
- After that entitlements are to grow by the GDP growth rate minus 2% in the first year, 1.5% in the second year and 1% in the last year (2002–03).

The government also announced he would set up a Health Services Research Fund with $65 millions in funding over 5 years.

== Aftermath ==
=== Legislative history ===
==== Budget Implementation Act, 1996 ====
The main provisions of the budget (except tax measures) were included in the Budget Implementation Act, 1996 (C-31) which received royal assent on 20 June 1996.

House of Commons vote on the Budget Implementation Act, 1996
Party	Yea	Nay	Abstention	Absent
Liberals	115	0	30	31
Bloc Québécois	0	22	30	1
Reform	0	28	0	23
New Democratic	0	4	0	5
Progressive Conservative	0	0	0	2
Independents	0	0	0	4
Total	115	54	60	66

==== Other bills ====
Income tax measures announced in the budget were implemented through Bill C-92 which received royal assent on 25 April 1997.

House of Commons vote on the Income Tax Budget Amendments Act, 1996
Party	Yea	Nay	Abstention	Absent
Liberals	99	0	28	50
Bloc Québécois	0	17	29	5
Reform	0	17	0	34
New Democratic	0	1	0	8
Progressive Conservative	0	0	0	2
Independents	0	0	0	5
Total	99	35	57	104

== Notes and references ==
=== References ===
==== Budget documents ====
- Budget Plan – Including Supplementary Information and Notices of Ways and Means Motions (PDF). Ottawa. 6 March 1996.
- Budget Speech (PDF). Ottawa. 6 March 1996.
- Budget in Brief (PDF). Ottawa. 6 March 1996.

==== Enacted legislations ====
- Budget Implementation Act, 1996, S.C. 1996, c. 18
- Income Tax Budget Amendments Act, 1996, S.C. 1997, c. 25
