= 1993 Canadian federal budget =

1993 Budget of the Canadian Federal Government
- Presented: 26 April 1993
- Country: Canada
- Parliament: 34th
- Party: Progressive Conservative
- Finance minister: Don Mazankowski
- Deficit: $38.5 billion

The 1993 Canadian budget was a Canadian federal budget for the Government of Canada presented by Minister of Finance Don Mazankowski in the House of Commons of Canada on 26 April 1993. It was the fifth budget after the 1988 Canadian federal election and would be the last before the 1993 Canadian federal election.

== Background ==
The budget was presented amid poor economic conditions and soaring federal deficit. Two month earlier, Brian Mulroney had announced his intention to resign as soon as a new Progressive Conservative leader is elected.

On 18 June 1992 the Spending Control Act received royal assent. That act provided for a legislated ceiling for federal program spending from 1991–1992 to 1995–1996. Few programs were excluded from the scope of the Act (notably Unemployment insurance). It is a complement to the Expenditure Control Plan announced in the 1990 budget and extended in 1991.

=== December 1992 Economic Statement ===
On 2 December 1992 Minister of Finance Don Mazankowski tabled an Economic and Fiscal Statement in the House of Commons of Canada which:

- Extended the Home Buyers' Plan by a year. Introduced in the February 1992 budget, it was warmly received by the public but set to expire on 1 March 1993;
- Created a Small Business Employment and Investment Package consisting of:
  - Exemption of UI premiums for newly created business in their first year of operation;
  - A new 10% investment tax credit for small businesses for investments in machinery and equipment purchased until 31 December 1993;
  - Another increase in the ceiling for loans under the Small Business Loans Act to $250,000;
  - A two-year extension to the Small Business Financing Program.
- Another round of expenditure reductions:
  - A salary freeze in 1993 and 1994 for public servants (including the Governor General and lieutenant governors of the provinces, the Prime Minister, Ministers, Parliamentarians and the federal judiciary);
  - Reduction in government operating budget of 3% in 1993-94;
  - A freeze in unemployment benefits achieved by decreasing the benefit rate from 60 to 57% for new beneficiaries between 4 April 1993 and 1 April 1995.
  - Most grants and subsidies to be cut by 10% (including the PUITTA transfer to provinces, the Green Plan and International Assistance);
  - Other programs (OAS, GIS, Veterans Allowance, major transfers to provinces...) are not affected.

== Taxes ==
The budget did not bring sweeping tax changes but introduced some technical changes for corporations :

- The budget allowed for faster depreciation of selected capital property items :
  - Creating an election to place eligible property (electronic data processing equipment, photocopiers) in separate CCA classes when the cost was $1,000 or more to allow immediate deduction for the taxpayer upon disposition of the equipment. That disposition is advantageous for equipment that depreciates fast.
  - A new CCA class with a rate of 25% was made available to patents and licence-to-use patents acquired after 26 April 1993. This measure allowed for faster amortization of patents in the first few years after the acquisition.
- The budget also announced that the 25% withholding tax on payments for the use of patents would be repealed. That tax was imposed on Canadian corporations' usage of foreign companies' patents.

== Expenditures ==
The budget planned for $7.5 billion of expenditure cuts over 5 years. Most of the cuts were however announced in the December 1992 Economic Statement ($5.3 billion) and few cuts were contained in the 1993 budget ($1.2 billion):

- The federal government planned to abolish 16,500 more jobs over 5 years (the 1992 Economic Statement already introduced a 2-year wage freeze for all public servants, including the Prime Minister, cabinet ministers, MPs, senators and the federal judiciary);
- $300 million were withheld from non-allocated reserves;
- Defence spending levels would be frozen to their 1994-1995 level;
- The unemployment benefits rate reduction was made permanent: it would remain at 57% even after April 1995;
- Funding for social housing was frozen at $2 billion yearly and the CMHC would no longer grant 35-year subsidies;
- Growth in funding for research and international aid was capped at 1.5% in 1994–1995.

== Reactions ==
The budget was poorly received, and described as "stand pat", "do nothing", "non-budget" and a "lame duck". Claude Picher, from La Presse, pointed out that the 100-pages long budget was one of the shortest budget ever and strongly criticized its lack of substance, overoptimistic economic forecasts and unimaginative measures.

Preceding the budget, Mazankowski had stated that government revenues would decrease compared to 1992 as a result of "slow economic growth, continued high unemployment and low inflation".

The Canadian Bond Rating Service downgraded Canada's federal debt rating from AAA to AA+, and the budgetary deficit for the fiscal year was expected to be $32.6 billion. Mazankowski stated that the rating service had based its decision on "erroneous information".

The value of the Canadian dollar declined with respect to the United States dollar in the foreign exchange market the day after the budget speech, and interest rates "climbed sharply".

== Aftermath ==
=== Legislative history ===
The budget was implemented through multiple bills:

- The spending cuts announcements of the December 1992 Economic Statement and the 1993 Budget were included in the Government Expenditure Restraint Act, 1993 No. 2 which received royal assent on 2 April 1993;
- Tax measures for both the December 1992 Statement and the April 1993 budget would not be voted until after the 1993 Canadian federal election.
  - A bill was tabled in June 1993 during the 34th Canadian Parliament but had not been adopted by the time the Parliament was dissolved;
  - Bill C-9 was tabled during the first session of the 35th Canadian Parliament and received royal assent on 12 May 1994 after passing third reading on 19 April 1994.
  - The bill was adopted on division as no party in the House of Commons were keen to reject tax measures announced by a previous government and that had been in effect, for some of them, for more than a year.

== Notes and references ==
=== References ===
==== Budget documents ====
- Economic and Fiscal Statement (PDF). Ottawa. 2 December 1992.
- The Budget 1993 (PDF). Ottawa. 26 April 1993.
- The Budget in Brief (PDF). Ottawa. 26 April 1993.

==== Draft and enacted legislation ====
- An Act to amend the Income Tax Act, S.C. 1994, c. 8
- Spending Control Act, S.C. 1992, c. 19
- Government Expenditure Restraint Act, 1993 No. 2, S.C. 1993, c. 13
