= 1992 Canadian federal budget =

Budget of the Canadian federal government

1992 Budget of the Canadian Federal Government
- Presented: 25 February 1992
- Country: Canada
- Parliament: 34th
- Party: Progressive Conservative
- Finance minister: Don Mazankowski
- Total revenue: 124.486 billion
- Total expenditures: 163.505 billion
- Deficit: $39.019 billion

The 1992 Canadian budget was a Canadian federal budget for the Government of Canada presented by Minister of Finance Don Mazankowski in the House of Commons of Canada on 25 February 1992. It was the fourth budget after the 1988 Canadian federal election. It is the first budget presented by Don Mazankowski.

== Background ==
The budget is presented amid poor economic conditions and soaring federal deficit.

== Taxes ==
The 1992 budget introduced significant changes to both personal and corporate income tax systems.

=== Personal income taxes ===
- Reduction in the personal surtax rate: the general personal surtax rate is lowered by 1 percentage point (to 4%) on 1 July 1992 and another (to 3%) on 1 January 1993. (Note: Effective surtax rate is 4.5% for fiscal year 1992.)
- Introduction of the Home buyers' plan (HBP): the budget created the HBP to allow individuals to withdraw up to $20,000 from their RRSPs to finance the purchase of a principal residence, repayable over 15 years. (Note: The measure was initially limited to proceeds received before 2 March 1993 for housing bought before 1 October 1993; subsequent budgets will expand the measure indefinitely which rendered both deadlines ineffective.)
- Creation of the Child Tax Benefit (CTB): starting January 1993 the CTB replaced family allowances, the child credit and the refundable child credit. The initial CTB amount is set at $1,020 with a Working Income Supplement of up to $500 for low-income working families.
- Increase of the child care expense deduction: the maximum deduction is increased by $1,000; (Note: Maximum deduction reaches $5,000 per child under 7 (or eligible to the Disability Tax Credit) and $3,000 in any other case.)
- The increase in the RRSP and RPP limits is delayed by a year.
- Improvements to the National Labour-sponsored venture capital corporation Tax Credit: the maximum yearly credit amount, set at $700 since 1985, is increased to $1,000 starting in fiscal year 1992. Investments rules for the program are also relaxed.

=== Corporate income taxes ===
The budget reduces taxes imposed on corporations by $2 billions over the 1992-1993 to 1996-1997 period. The budget specifically provides relief to the manufacturing and processing industries that have been seriously affected by the recession.

- Reduction in the manufacturing and processing tax rate: phased-in two steps, 22% on 1 January 1993 (down from 23%) and 21% on 1 January 1994; (Note: Achieved through a phased-in increase to the manufacturing and processing profit deduction listed in s 125.1 of the Income Tax Act.)
- Faster depreciation for selected equipment: the CCA deduction rate for eligible manufacturing and processing machinery and equipment is increased from 25 to 30%.

=== Other taxes ===
- The withholding tax on direct dividends is reduced to 5% from 25%.

== Expenditures ==
=== Expenditure Control Plan ===
The Expenditure Control Plan announced in the 1990 budget and extended in 1991 is continued and broadened in the 1992 budget:

- The Prime Minister and all cabinet ministers took a 5% pay cut on 1 April 1992;
- Departments' budget were further cut by 3% between 1992-93 and 1996-97 and spending reductions of $170 millions in 1992-93 alone were imposed;
- Federal departments' communication budgets were cut by $75 millions;
- Defence spending was cut by $258 millions in 1992-93 over previously planned levels, with cumulative cuts of $2.2 billions over the 1992-93 to 1996-97 period;
- Growth in spending on social housing by the CMHC was capped at 3% yearly until 1996-97, amounting to 27 millions in cuts for 1992-93;
- Other management initiatives are announced:
  - 24 federal agencies are abolished or merged;
  - 13 ministerial advising bodies are abolished or merged;
  - New travel guidelines were introduced to reduce costs.

== Reactions ==
The budget garnered mixed reaction from columnist Jean-Paul Gagné from Les Affaires who pointed out that the budget was unextraordinary but contained some interesting measures (reduction in the income surtax, no increase in the GST rate, Home Buyers' Plan).

=== Opposition ===
The Liberal leader of the Official Opposition in Ottawa Jean Chrétien, and the NDP leader Audrey McLaughlin, criticized the budget for its lack of measures to fight unemployment. The Bloc Québécois leader Lucien Bouchard pointed out the budget was a proof that the federal government was at the end of its rope.

=== Business community and labour unions ===
The budget was well received by the business community and especially real-estate and construction actors. The value of the Canadian dollar increased by 0.39 cents with respect to the United States dollar in the foreign exchange market the day after the budget speech. The TSX 300 index gained 35.52 points while the Montreal Stock Exchange index gained 19.39 points.

Quebec's labour unions (CSN, CEQ and FTQ) were disappointed by the budget pointing out the lack of measures to fight unemployment and poverty and the lack of new infrastructure projects. The unions also criticized the abolition of the Economic Council of Canada.

=== Provinces ===
Quebec's finance minister, Gérard D. Levesque, received the budget favourably talking about a step in the right direction in that it did not reduce transfers to provinces.

The PQ, the Official Opposition in Quebec, on the other hand decried the budget as cosmetic and not going far enough to fight unemployment although some tax relief measures (and especially the reduction in the personal surtax) were applauded.

Ontario's NDP Finance minister Floyd Laughren also criticized the lack of measures to fight unemployment.

== Aftermath ==
=== Legislative history ===
The Child Tax Benefit was scheduled to enter into force on 1 January 1993 and was included in a separate bill which received royal assent on 15 October 1992. Dissolution of some abolished crown corporation and other public bodies was included in bill C-63 which received royal assent on 15 February 1993.

Some minor changes announced in the budget (notably amendments to the Canada Student Loans Act and pay cuts for the Prime Minister and federal ministers) were included in the Budget Implementation (fiscal measures) Act, 1992 which received royal assent more than a year after the budget speech, on 2 April 1993.

Most significant tax measures of the budget were included in bill C-24 which received royal assent on 10 June 1993.

== Notes and references ==
=== References ===
==== Budget documents ====
- Budget Papers 1992 (PDF). Ottawa. 25 February 1992.
- Main estimates
  - 1992-93 Estimates. Vol. Part I — The Government Expenditure Plan. Ottawa: Supply and Services Canada. 1992. ISBN 0-660-57324-5.

==== Enacted legislations ====
- An Act to amend the Income Tax Act, to enact the Children's Special Allowances Act, to amend certain other Acts in consequence thereof and to repeal the Family Allowances Act, S.C. 1992, c. 48
- An Act to dissolve or terminate certain corporations and other bodies, S.C. 1993, c. 1
- Budget Implementation (fiscal measures) Act, 1992, S.C. 1993, c. 12
- An Act to amend the Income Tax Act, the Canada Pension Plan, the Income Tax Conventions Interpretation Act, the Tax Rebate Discounting Act, the Unemployment Insurance Act and certain related Acts, S.C. 1993, c. 24
