= Caregiver tax credit =

Canadian tax credit for caregivers

The Caregiver Tax Credit (CTC) is a tax credit available in Canada to individuals who provide in-home support for a relative who is a dependent, is over 18 and resides with the supporting relative in his/her residence at some time in the year. It is found on line 315 of the Canadian federal tax return.

The dependent must be a child, grandchild, brother, sister, niece, nephew, aunt, uncle, parent or grandparent. The caregiver credit is not applicable unless at some time in the year the dependent resides with the person taking the credit. Families using a Henson trust, the Canada Disability Child Benefit other estate planning methods for children with disabilities are not excluded from the DTC .

== Benefits ==
As of 2012, the CTC was worth approximately $600 in annual tax saving. it could be retroactively filed for 10 years which can result in an overall tax savings of approximately $5,000. The CTC erodes dollar-for-dollar if the dependent's income exceeds $13,986 and becomes completely if it tops the $17,745 threshold. The tax payer cannot claim both the caregiver tax credit and the amount for an infirm dependent 18 or over.
