= Registered disability savings plan =

A registered disability savings plan (RDSP; French: Régime enregistré d'épargne invalidité) is a Government of Canada program designed to enable individuals with disabilities, with assistance from family and friends to save for their future financial security. The Government of Canada assists people to save with the Canada Disability Savings Program, consisting of the Canada Disability Savings Grant and Canada Disability Savings Bond. The Canada Disability Savings Grant matches personal contributions. The Canada Disability Savings Bond provides funding to RDSPs of people with low and moderate incomes.

The RDSP is similar to a registered education savings plan. A person who establishes an RDSP can make contributions to the plan up to a lifetime limit of $200,000 for the benefit of the person named the beneficiary.

Contributions are not tax-deductible, and earnings and growth accrue on a tax-deferred basis. Anyone can contribute. The contributions grow tax-free until withdrawn – at which time a proportion of the plan (earnings and growth received) is taxable and will need to be declared as income in the hands of the beneficiary at that time. In most cases it should not affect eligibility for provincial disability benefits. There are no maximum annuations. Contributions can be made up to the end of the year in which the beneficiary turns 59 years old.

This is not an alternative to setting up a trust for a person with disabilities, but should be used in conjunction with other vehicles, such as Henson trusts, insurance products, segregated funds and Lifetime Benefits Trusts to build a solid financial plan.

== Eligibility ==
To open an RDSP, a person must:

- be eligible for the Disability Tax Credit
- be 59 or younger as of December 31 of the current year
- be resident of Canada
- have a valid Social Insurance Number

To qualify for the Disability Tax Credit the individual must be "markedly restricted" in at least one of the following categories: vision, speaking, hearing, walking, elimination (bowel or bladder functions), feeding, dressing, performing the mental functions of everyday life, life-sustaining therapy to support vital function and the recently introduced cumulative effects of significant restrictions.

Only one RDSP account may be set up per qualifying individual, and only that beneficiary is entitled to any payments. An RDSP arrangement must be between the issuer and either the beneficiary, a qualifying person in relation to the beneficiary or a legal parent who is not a qualifying person, but who is a holder of another RDSP of the beneficiary. A qualifying person can only establish and administer an RDSP on behalf of the beneficiary if the beneficiary lacks the mental capacity to do so himself or herself. A disabled adult with mental capacity who wished to benefit from an RDSP must establish the plan himself or herself, however, family members, friends or others could contribute to a plan established by the disabled person, with his or her permission.

== Benefits ==
Person receiving provincial disability benefits can set up an RDSP, without going through an asset-test and without it affecting provincial disability benefits, where applicable.

If the beneficiary's income level is less than $21,287, the beneficiary should receive annual Government of Canada Disability Savings Bonds, to a lifetime maximum of $20,000 per RDSP. Add also the Canada Disability Savings Grant, if the beneficiary's income is $75,769 or less for an additional $3,500/yr,(for each $1.00 that is deposited to the RDSP, the government will match that up to $3.00 prorated to the beneficiary's income) to a lifetime maximum of $70,000. This works out such that, if the beneficiary over the age of 18 meets the appropriate income levels, an initiation contribution of $1,500 can result in $3,500 in matching government funds. There are complex rules governing the withdrawal of funds from RDSPs that could potentially see the beneficiary having to repay government grant and bond moneys if withdrawals are made before the funds have vested for a period of 10 years.

Beneficiaries will only receive grant and bond moneys up until the year in which they turn 49 years old. Monies can be contributed to the RDSP until the end of the year in which the beneficiary turns 59. Payments to the beneficiary must begin when the beneficiary turns 60.

If maximum matching contributions have been made since the child turned 18, then when he/she turns 38, there will be no further federal contributions available. The total of $90,000 grants and bonds available will already have been maximized. The growth on the total contributed will presumably be larger than if the plan is set up at a later age.

RDSP payments are "blended" on a pro-rata basis, since the contributions were made with after-tax dollars, while the grants and bonds as well as interest/earnings on the whole plan are taxable.

RDSP income will not affect entitlement to: Old Age Security (OAS) payments and GST credits.

In the event of the RDSP beneficiary's death, the plan's value is paid out to the beneficiary's estate, subject to the 10 year assistance holdback rule.

== History ==
The RDSP was announced by the Government of Canada in its 2007 Budget and became available in 2008.

- The federal Minister of Finance commissioned an Expert Panel Report on Financial Security for Children with Severe Disabilities, titled A New Beginning

The funds within the RDSP grow on a tax deferred basis. Most federal, provincial and municipal social programs exempt these assets when means testing the client's entitlement to their services.

- Budget 2019 eliminates the requirement of closing the account if the beneficiary no longer qualifies for the Disability Tax Credit.

== Providers ==
- ATB Securities Inc.
- Bank of Montreal
- Scotiabank
- Central 1 Credit Union
- Central 1 Trust Company
- Community Trust Company
- Credential Qtrade Securities
- CIBC
- Desjardins
- Investors Group Trust Co. Ltd.
- Fonds d'investissements FMOQ inc. (French only)
- Mackenzie Financial Corporation
- RBC Royal Bank
- TD Waterhouse Canada Inc.
- Natcan Trust Company
