= 1997 Canadian federal budget =

Fourth government spending plan under Paul Martin; first with a surplus since the '60s

1997 Budget of the Canadian Federal Government Building the Future for Canadians
- Presented: 18 February 1997
- Country: Canada
- Parliament: 35th
- Party: Liberal
- Finance minister: Paul Martin
- Total revenue: 160.864 billion
- Total expenditures: 157.905 billion
- Surplus: $2.959 billion

The Canadian federal budget for fiscal year 1997–98 was presented by Minister of Finance Paul Martin in the House of Commons of Canada on 18 February 1997. It is the last budget of the 35th Canadian Parliament and the last budget before the 1997 Canadian federal election. The budget's unofficial subtitle is Building the Future for Canadians (and for the first time the subtitle is used on the cover page of all budget documents).

== Taxes ==
=== Personal income taxes ===
The budget focused on increased support for education, healthcare and childcare-related expenses.

==== Tax measures for students ====
- Indefinite carry-forward for Tuition and Education Tax Credit for all tax credits incurred in 1997 and after;
- Increase in the Education Tax Credit: from $100 annually in 1996 to $150 in 1997 and $200 in 1998 and subsequent years;
- The list of expenses eligible for the tuition tax credit is expanded to include mandatory ancillary fees (except student association fees);
- The first $500 of scholarship or bursary income is exempted from income taxes;
- Registered education savings plan yearly contribution limit to be doubled from $2,000 to $4,000 per beneficiary.

==== Tax measures for persons with disabilities ====
- Some new categories expenses incurred by persons with disabilities are made eligible for the medical expense tax credit;
- The $5,000 limit on the attendant care deduction is repealed;
  - Disabled persons will be allowed to deduct the entirety of the expenses incurred (and not only the first $5,000) up to 2/3 of their earned income.

==== Working Income Supplement enhancement ====
The Working Income Supplement (WIS) is vastly enhanced by the budget:

Working Income Supplement enhancement
	Pre-budget	Post-budget Starting July 1, 1997
Maximum benefit	$500 $750 starting July 1997 $1,000 starting July 1998	$605 for the first child + $405 for the second child + $330 for the third and each subsequent child
Phase-in start income level	$3,750	
Maximum benefit income level	$10,000–$20,921	
Phase-out start income level	$20,921	
Phase-out reduction rate	10%	12.1% for one-child families 20.2% for two-child families 26.8% otherwise
Phase-out complete income level	$25,921	

=== Corporate income taxes ===
Some technical changes were made to corporate income taxes, mostly to increase revenues:

- Transfer pricing guidelines were reviewed in line with the principles set out by the OECD;
- The Investment Tax Credit is denied for expenses that have not been reported within 12 months after the filing due date of the year in which the expenses were incurred;
  - This change extends to ITC the restriction introduced by the 1994 Canadian federal budget for the deduction of SR&ED expenses.

=== Other taxes ===
- The temporary capital tax surcharge on large banks is extended by a year until 31 October 1998.
- The budget also proposes to allow small businesses to remit withholding amounts (income taxes, Employment Insurance premiums and Canada Pension Plan contributions) on a quarterly basis if their average monthly withholding is less than $1,000 and their file presents no compliance irregularities.

== Expenditures ==
Marcel Massé, President of the Treasury Board, tabled the 1997-98 Main Estimates on 20 February 1997, outlining the government's spending plan for the year ending 31 March 1998. The budget planned for a 2.9% decrease in program expenses over 1996-97 with $103.2 billion set aside in the budget and another $2.8 billion to be allocated through a supplementary budget sometime in the year.

Including the $46 billion interest expense on the national debt, the Main Estimates totals $149,555,320,000 in spending for the 1997-98 fiscal year, an $8 billions decline versus the preceding fiscal year.

Several transfers and departments were affected by cuts:

- Department of National Defence faced $638 million in budget cuts, mainly attributable to the cancellation of the EH-101 helicopter project;
- The Canada Health and Social Transfer (CHST) was cut by a further $2.5 billion;
- Equalization payments were cut by a further $504 million.

== Reactions ==
Bernard Landry, Deputy premier of Quebec and Minister of Finance, severely criticized the Martin budget as an electoralist and cynical budget. He pointed out that the budget planned for $1.4 billion in cuts for the CHST and set aside funds for actions in areas of provincial jurisdiction (notably health and childcare). He also regretted that the budget did not set aside a compensation for the harmonization of the Quebec Sales Tax with the federal GST, for which he asked a $1.9 billion compensation.

Lucien Bouchard, Premier of Quebec, expressed a similar opinion, saying that the budget was hypocritical, bordering on dishonesty.

Ernie Eves, Ontario's Minister of Finance, expressed mixed feelings: he welcomed the deficit reduction effort of the federal government but regretted that Paul Martin chose not to cut income taxes or Employment insurance premiums.

== Legislative history ==
Most changes announced in the budget were included in the omnibus Budget Implementation Act, 1997 which received royal assent on 27 April 1997 after being adopted by the House of Commons on third reading on 22 April 1997 by 109 votes for versus 51 against (Reform, NDP and Bloc MPs). No Progressive-Conservative MPs voted on the bill. Four days after the budget passed, Chretien dissolved parliament and called for an election to be held on June 2nd.
