= 1989 Canadian federal budget =

1989 Budget of the Canadian Federal Government
- Presented: 27 April 1989
- Country: Canada
- Parliament: 34th
- Party: Progressive Conservative
- Finance minister: Michael Wilson
- Deficit: CA$29,143,000,000

The Canadian federal budget for fiscal year 1989–90 was presented to the House of Commons of Canada by finance minister Michael Wilson on 27 April 1989. It was the first budget after the 1988 Canadian federal election.

The budget set the stage for a plan to eliminate the deficit within three years. It would do so through spending cuts and raising taxes.

== Background ==
In the November 1988 election campaign, the issue of the debt and the deficit was seldom raised. However, in February 1989, International Moneratary Fund had publicly warned the Canadian government that its Canadian national debt had gone out of control, and that radical measures were needed to curb the deficit. At the time, it totaled $320 billion, and was the highest among all industrialized countries (except Italy).

In the months leading up to the budget, the government often brought up the subject of the debt and the deficit in public appearances, making the case that it was putting the Canadian economy in great danger. These efforts were fruitful. According to Gallup polling data from March 1989, the deficit was ranked second in the list of the people's major concerns, with 18% saying it was the issue that required the greatest attention (behind the environment at 28%). In January 1989, that number was 10%, and 4% during the 1988 election cycle.

=== Leak ===
On April 26, 1989, parts of the budget were leaked to the press. Global TV Parliament Hill bureau chief Doug Small read the highlights of the budget on air. He had received the documents that afternoon from John Appleby, a Department of National Defence clerk (whose friend worked at the recycling plant where it was found). This forced minister Wilson to call a press conference at 5:30 PM that day, where he improvised the early release of the budget.

Brian Mulroney called the leak a criminal act, and charged Small, Appleby, the recycling plant worker and 2 others of possession of stolen property. Charges against Small were eventually thrown out the following year.

The main provisions of the budget are measures with the objective to reduce the deficit. These include spending cuts and tax increases.

== Taxes ==
The budget raised 9 billion dollars in new taxes.

=== Personal income taxes ===
- Clawback of Old Age Security (OAS) and Family allowance:
  - The budget planned on taxing back OAS payments and family allowance benefits from people with net income of $50,000 or more. This measure chips away the universality of these programs;
- Increase of the federal surtax:
  - On July 1, 1989, the 3% surtax on personal incomes would raise to 5%;
- Creation of an additional surtax for high-income taxpayers:
- On July 1, 1989, an additional 3% surtax is introduced on basic federal tax in excess of $15,000. That surtax affects taxpayers earning over $70,000 per year;
- The tax rate of income not attributed to a province is increased from 47% to 52% of basic federal tax starting on July 1, 1989. Minor increase in tax revenues is expected from that change.

=== Corporate income taxes ===
- Introduction of a Large Corporations Tax: a new tax is levied on large corporation at a rate of 0.175% of taxable capital employed in Canada in excess of $10 million (that $10 million exemption is shared among related corporation). That new tax is very similar to provincial taxes on capital. It is not a deductible charge for the federal corporate income tax but is creditable against the 3% federal surtax. The government projected this tax would yield revenues of $965 million in 1989-1990.

=== Other Taxes ===
==== Goods and services tax ====
The budget announced the introduction of the Federal Goods and Services Tax, which planned to be effective on January 1, 1991. It was initially planned to be set at 9%.

==== Sales and Excise taxes ====
Pending the introduction of the Goods and services tax, the government introduced changes to existing sales and excise taxes:

- Federal Sales Tax rate increases :

Category	Old Rate	New Rate	Effective
Construction materials, equipment	8%	9%	1 January 1990
Alcohol and tobacco	18%	19%	28 April 1989
Telecommunications	10%	11%	1 June 1989
All other goods	12%	13.5%	1 June 1989

- Increase of Refundable Federal Sales Tax Credit: the tax credits was increased from $70 to $100 per adult in 1989 and $140 in 1990;
- Increase of gasoline tax: The price of gasoline rose by 1 cent per litre.
- Increase in cigarettes excises: excise duties are increased by $0.01695 per cigarette; yielding $725 million in additional yearly revenues.

== Expenditures ==
=== Cuts to programs ===
Via Rail's subsidy was cut by 500 million dollars, as were the subsidies of numerous other crown corporations and agencies. Air Canada was fully privatized, as the 55% of shares the government still held were planned to be sold.

The 8-billion dollar nuclear submarine program has been scrapped, and the military was planned to suffer spending cuts amounting 2.7-billion dollars over five years.

The budget for Official Development Assistance (i.e. international aid) would be cut by $360 million in 1989-1990 (the program's growth rate would be capped at 5% in the 1990 federal budget).

Federal day-care commitments were also cut, as were many other provincial transfers.

== Reactions ==
=== Opposition ===
The Liberal Party and the New Democratic Party (NDP) were both vehemently opposed to the budget. On the day the budget was leaked, NDP leader Ed Broadbent called on finance minister Michael Wilson to resign.

=== Unions ===
Almost every Canadian labour unions reacted very negatively to the budget, criticizing its tax increases and its lack of job-creating measures. Shirley Carr, president of the Canadian Labour Congress (CTC), said that the budget was "an economic aggression that is not necessary. It is a cruel and brutal that will come to symbolize the free trade agreement". The CTC and 80 affiliated labour unions launched a nationwide campaign to have most of the budget's measures undone.

=== Provinces ===
Every single provincial governments was opposed to the budget. As per example, Manitoba's PC premier Gary Filmon said he was "extremely disappointed" by the budget. Both him and Quebec premier Robert Bourassa called on other provinces to oppose the budget, which he saw as a ploy to transfer the federal government's financial burden on to the provinces.

Provinces were especially irritated by the introduction of a federal sales tax. Shortly after the budget was presented, Bourassa and Ontario premier David Peterson called for its introduction to be cancelled. They were subsequently joined in this effort by British Columbia premier Bill Vander Zalm and Newfoundland and Labrador premier Clyde Wells. The former had previously claimed the budget was "worse than expected".

Parti Québécois leader and Leader of the Opposition in the National Assembly of Quebec Jacques Parizeau called for Quebec to patriate Employment Insurance from Canada in reaction to the cuts proposed to the program in the budget.

== Aftermath ==
=== Execution ===
Budgetary items in billions of dollars
Element	1988-1989	1989-1990	
Element	Actual	Budget	Actual
Tax revenues	96.64	112.40	105.40
Non-tax revenues	7.43	112.40	8.31
Program expenditures	(99.85)	(103.50)	(103.88)
Public debt charge	(33.17)	(39.40)	(38.82)
Deficit	(28.95)	(30.50)	(29.00)
Non-budgetary transactions	6.47	10.00	8.47
Financial requirements	(22.48)	(20.50)	(20.53)

== Notes and references ==
=== References ===
==== Budget documents ====
- The Budget Speech (PDF). Ottawa. 27 April 1989.
- Budget Papers (PDF). Ottawa. 27 April 1989.
