= UCCB =

UCCB can refer to:

- The University College of Cape Breton, a Canadian university located in the province of Nova Scotia;
- The Universal Canada Child Benefit a former childcare benefit paid by the Government of Canada between 2006 and 2016.
