= Paul Rosen =

Canadian motivational speaker and former hockey player

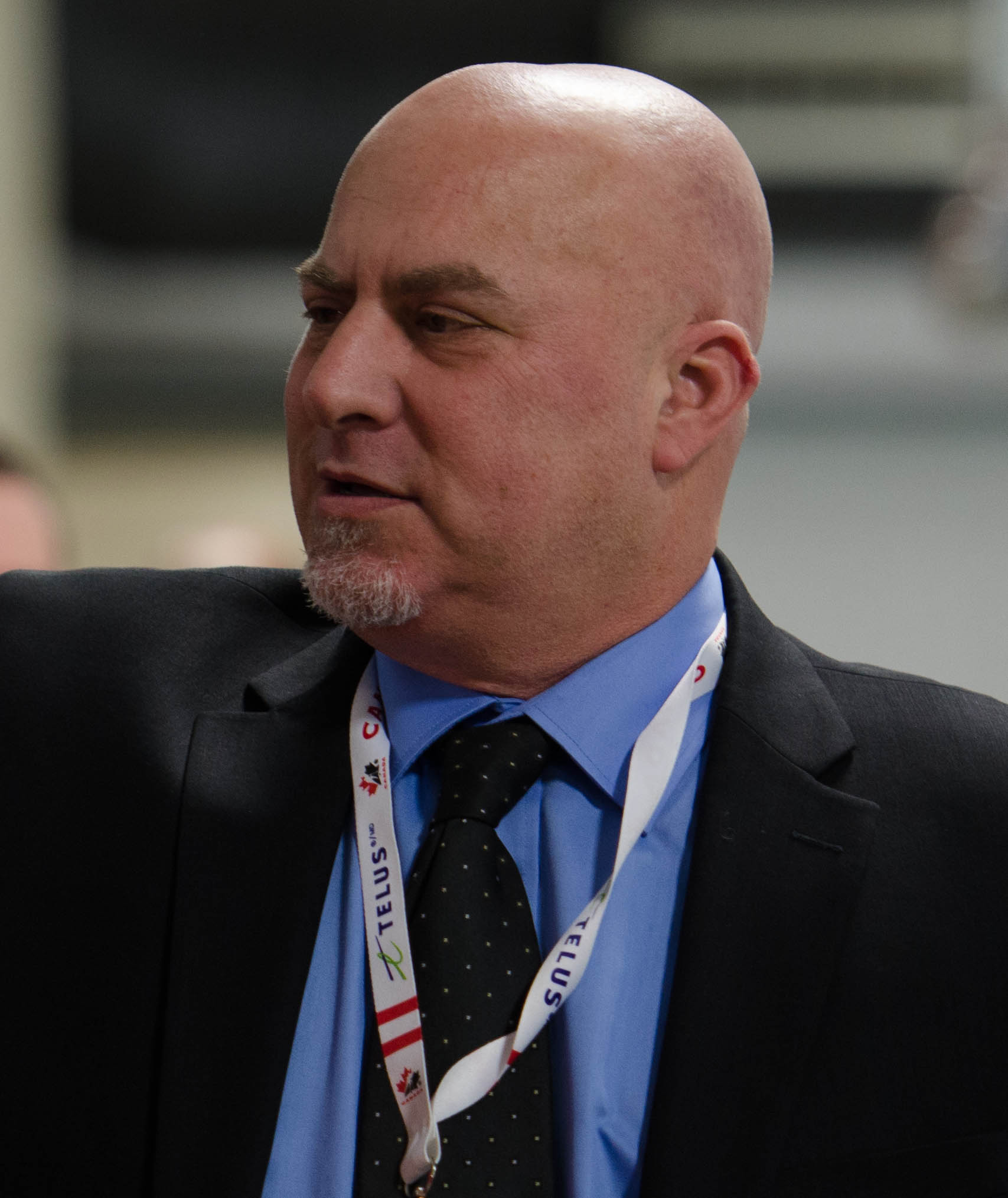
- Rosen in 2015
- Born: April 26, 1960 (age 66) Toronto, Ontario, Canada
- Height: 6 ft 0 in (183 cm)
- Weight: 189 lb (86 kg; 13 st 7 lb)
- Position: Goalie
- National team: Canada
- Playing career: 2001–2010
Medal record
Men's para ice hockey
Representing Canada
Paralympic Games
Gold medal – first place	2006 Turin	Team
World Championships
Gold medal – first place	2008 Marlborough	Team
Bronze medal – third place	2009 Ostrava	Team

Paul Rosen (born April 26, 1960) is a Canadian ice sledge hockey goalie and motivational speaker from Thornhill, Ontario.

== Career ==
Rosen suffered a leg injury during a hockey game as a youth, and the resulting damage, infections, and pain to his leg plagued him for years until his lower leg was amputated at age 39. During rehabilitation, Rosen joined the Canadian National Sledge hockey team and participated in the 2002 and 2006 Winter Paralympics. Rosen was the oldest rookie in the history of the Paralympic Winter Games when he made his debut at 41. At the 2006 Games in Turin, Rosen and the Canadian team won the sledge hockey gold medal.

In January 2007, Rosen made headlines across Canada when his Paralympic gold medal was stolen during an autographing session with fans in Toronto. After commentator Don Cherry told the thief to drop the gold medal in a mailbox during his Hockey Night in Canada broadcast, the medal turned up at a postal sorting station in Toronto and was returned to Rosen. He announced his retirement from the Canadian ice sledge hockey team on September 7, 2010 (along with captain Jean Labonte, Todd Nicholson and Herve Lord).

Rosen also competed in sitting volleyball, another parasport. He became a member of Canada's sitting volleyball team at the 2007 Parapan American Games in Rio de Janeiro, Brazil. Rosen was part of the first official international match for Canada's sitting volleyball team when they played the United States on August 15, 2007.

After retiring from competitive sports, Rosen became an official ambassador and spokesperson for National Benefit Authority. When Rosen turned 50, he revealed that he had struggled with literacy his whole life and was returning to school. He then became an ambassador for ABC Life Literacy, to help people conquer the shame and stigma of illiteracy.

== Statistics ==
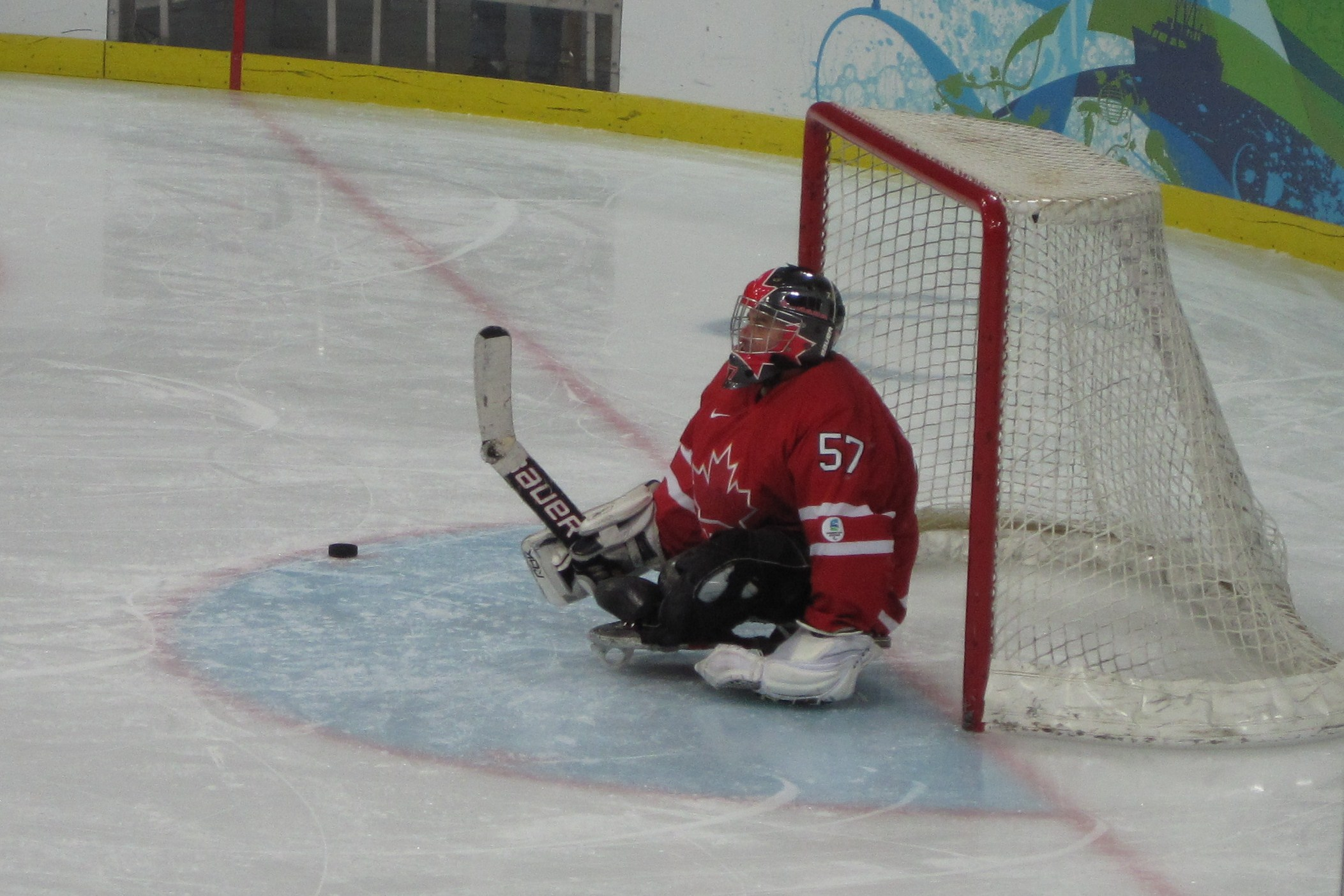
Rosen at the 2010 Winter Paralympics in Vancouver

Rosen spent nine seasons with the Canadian national ice sledge hockey team. By the end of his career, he accumulated a won loss record of 55-15-1. In addition, he registered a 1.04 goals-against average and 25 shutouts in 72 career games.

Hockey Canada

Year	Event	GP	MIN	GA	SO	GAA	W	L	T
2007	World sledge hockey challenge	4	153	4	1	1.57	4	0	0
2008	World sledge hockey championships	2	90	0	2	0.00	2	0	0
2009	World sledge hockey championships	3	141	3	2	1.28	2	1	0
