= 2011 Canadian federal budget =

2011 Budget of the Canadian Federal Government
- Presented: 22 March 2011, then again 6 June 2011
- Passed: 13 June 2011
- Country: Canada
- Parliament: 41st
- Party: Conservative
- Finance minister: Jim Flaherty
- Total revenue: C$235.6 billion^{‡}
- Total expenditures: C$276.0 billion
- Program spending: C$278.7 billion
- Debt payment: C$33.0 billion
- Deficit: C$26.2 billion
- Debt: C$586.0 billion
- Website: http://www.budget.gc.ca/2011/plan/Budget2011-eng.pdf The Next Phase of Canada's Economic Action Plan—A Low-Tax Plan for Jobs and Growth
- ^{‡}Numbers in italics are projections.

The Canadian federal budget for the 2011–12 fiscal year was presented to the House of Commons of Canada by Finance Minister Jim Flaherty on March 22, 2011, then again on June 6 following a May 2 election.

On June 13, "the budget passed by a vote of 167 to 131, with four Bloc Québécois MPs voting in support and the other opposition parties voting against it".

== Proposals ==
- Increasing the Guaranteed Income Supplement (GIS) for seniors who rely Old Age Security and the GIS.
- Tax credits for family caregivers, children's arts and crafts programs and volunteer fire-fighters.
- Student loan forgiveness for doctors and nurses who re-locate to remote or rural areas.
- "Strengthening the Charitable Sector" - measures to enhance the ability of Canadians to give with confidence to charities, and to help ensure that more resources are available for legitimate charities.
- Increase in the EI premium tax from 1.78% to 1.83, effective January 1, 2012

== Legislative history ==
All three opposition parties rejected the budget in statements made after the budget speech:

- "The NDP will not be supporting the budget as presented," Jack Layton, leader of the New Democratic Party
- "We're forced to reject the budget and we're also forced to reject a government that shows so little respect for parliamentary democracy and our democratic institutions." Michael Ignatieff, leader of the Liberal Party of Canada
- "It's obvious that we cannot support this budget," Gilles Duceppe, leader of the Bloc Québécois, said before describing how it did not meet the needs of his province.

A motion of non-confidence was passed on March 25, 2011. While this motion, which found the government in contempt of Parliament, did not relate specifically to the budget, it had the practical effect of dissolving parliament and killing any legislation under consideration.

=== Post-election ===
Federal elections were held May 2, 2011. The Conservatives went from a minority position in the House of Commons to a majority, paving the way for the re-introduction of the measures contained in the budget.

Initiatives from the budget were included in 2 draft bills:

- Those related to the Guaranteed Income Supplement (along with various other announcements made in the budget) were included in Bill C-3 (Supporting Vulnerable Seniors and Strengthening Canada's Economy Act) which was adopted on third reading on 21 June 2011 by 158 votes for version 133 votes against. This bill received support from all 155 Conservatives voting MPs, 2 Bloc MPs (André Bellavance and Jean-François Fortin) and Elizabeth May, the only Green MP. All voting NDP (100) and Liberal (33) MPs voted against the bill. The bill received royal assent on 26 June 2011.
- Most tax-related initiatives were included in Bill C-13 (Keeping Canada's Economy and Jobs Growing Act) which was adopted on third reading on 21 November 2011 by 153 votes for versus 127 against. Only Conservative MPs voted for the bill, every vote cast by NDP, Liberal, Bloc and Green MPs were against the bill. The bill received royal assent on 15 December 2011.
