= Social Security Tribunal of Canada =

Canadian tribunal

Social Security Tribunal of Canada (formerly Canada Pension Plan / Old Age Security Review Tribunals) is a Canadian independent body that is mandated to hear quasi-judicial issues regarding the Canada Pension Plan (CPP), Old Age Security (OAS), and the Employment Insurance Act (EI).

== Role ==
The body is an independent quasi-judicial board that is mandated to hear appeals of decisions made in regards to CPP, OAS, and EI by Employment and Social Development Canada (ESDC), Service Canada and the Canada Employment Insurance Commission. Decisions are made by a single maker called a "tribunal member." The tribunal is made up of a general division and appeal division.

== History ==
=== Employment Insurance Board of Referees ===
The Employment Insurance Board of Referees was made up of around 1,000 part-time members and 32 umpires. Decisions were made by a three-person panel, with appeals to one of the umpires.

=== Office of the Commissioner of Review Tribunals ===
The Office of the Commissioner of Review Tribunals (OCRT) was responsible for the administration of the Review Tribunal level of appeal under the Canada Pension Plan starting in December 1991. In 1995, Review Tribunals were entrusted with final appeals under the Old Age Security Act.

Each appeal was heard by three members chosen by the Commissioner of Review Tribunals from a panel appointed by the Governor-in-Council. A review tribunal was chaired by a lawyer and where a disability benefit was at issue, one panel member had to be a member of a prescribed health profession.

=== Social Security Tribunal of Canada ===
In May 2012, the Government of Canada under Stephen Harper announced that the government would replace the review tribunal with a newly formed Social Security Tribunal of Canada, which would be made up of 74 members. The change was implemented in April 2013. The new body was tasked with hearing all appeals of CPP, OAS, and EI decisions. The tribunal was to be made up of 34 adjudicators located across the country. The government said it would bring taxpayers $25 million a year in savings by consolidating the appeals process.

In May 2013, after the tribunal was filled, it was reported that at least half of the 46 full-time members of the tribunal had ties to the Conservative Party of Canada. In September 2014, a 50-member "spike unit" was set up to help with a backlog of appeals involving EI and other decisions. The unit was intended to last until March 2015. By January 2016, the spike unit had still not disbanded.
