= National Benefit Authority =

The National Benefit Authority
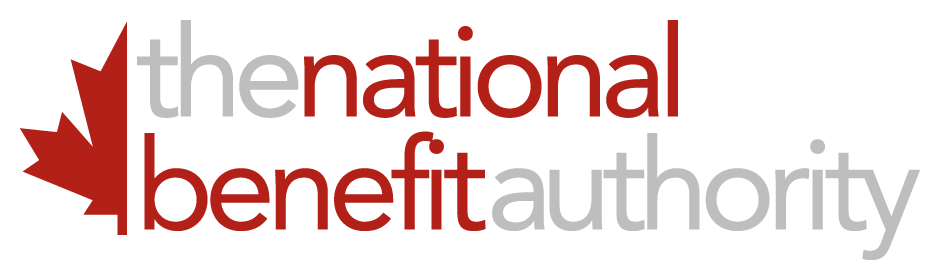
- Company type: Corporation
- Industry: Tax
- Founded: Toronto, (2008)
- Founder: Akiva Medjuck
- Headquarters: Toronto, Canada
- Area served: Canada
- Products: Disability Tax Credit; Tax advice
- Number of employees: 140 (2015)
- Website: www.thenba.ca

National Benefit Authority (NBA) is the largest Disability Tax Credit service provider in Canada, and a founding member of the Association of Canadian Disability Benefit Professionals (ACDBP). Based in Toronto, National Benefit Authority assists clients across Canada in applying for the credit in exchange for a 30% share of the credit. NBA has supported over 40,000 successful applications.

The company was founded by Akiva Medjuck, who saw firsthand what it was like to deal with physical challenges, from relatives coping with disabilities, including a brother and a sister, both born deaf.

== Disputes ==
In 2010, eight customers filed complaints with the Better Business Bureau over issues such as billing. The Canada Revenue Agency and other social organizations expressed concern that the NBA may be profiting from individuals who could file for free or use less expensive services from competitors. In 2011, the Toronto Star and CBC jointly reported that two of the doctors paid by the NBA to certify customers' disabilities were unqualified to do so. Former employees reported that clients were encouraged to exaggerate disabilities. Medjuck denied all accusations. The company was reportedly under CRA investigation. Medjuck previously headed Canadian Ptach Society Inc., a non-profit found by the CRA to have adapted illnesses to fit the DTC criteria. Canada Ptach Society's license was revoked a year after the NBA was launched.

== Charitable activities ==
Since 2011, National Benefit Authority has maintained The Akiva and Bilah Medjuck Foundation a philanthropic group aiming "to give those with disabilities a chance at a better life". In, 2015 they presented $150,000 to the True Patriot Love Foundation to benefit Canadian military families with children with special needs, and partnered with Volleyball Canada to support Canada's men's and women's sitting volleyball teams.
