= New shoes on budget day =

Canadian political tradition for Ministers of Finance

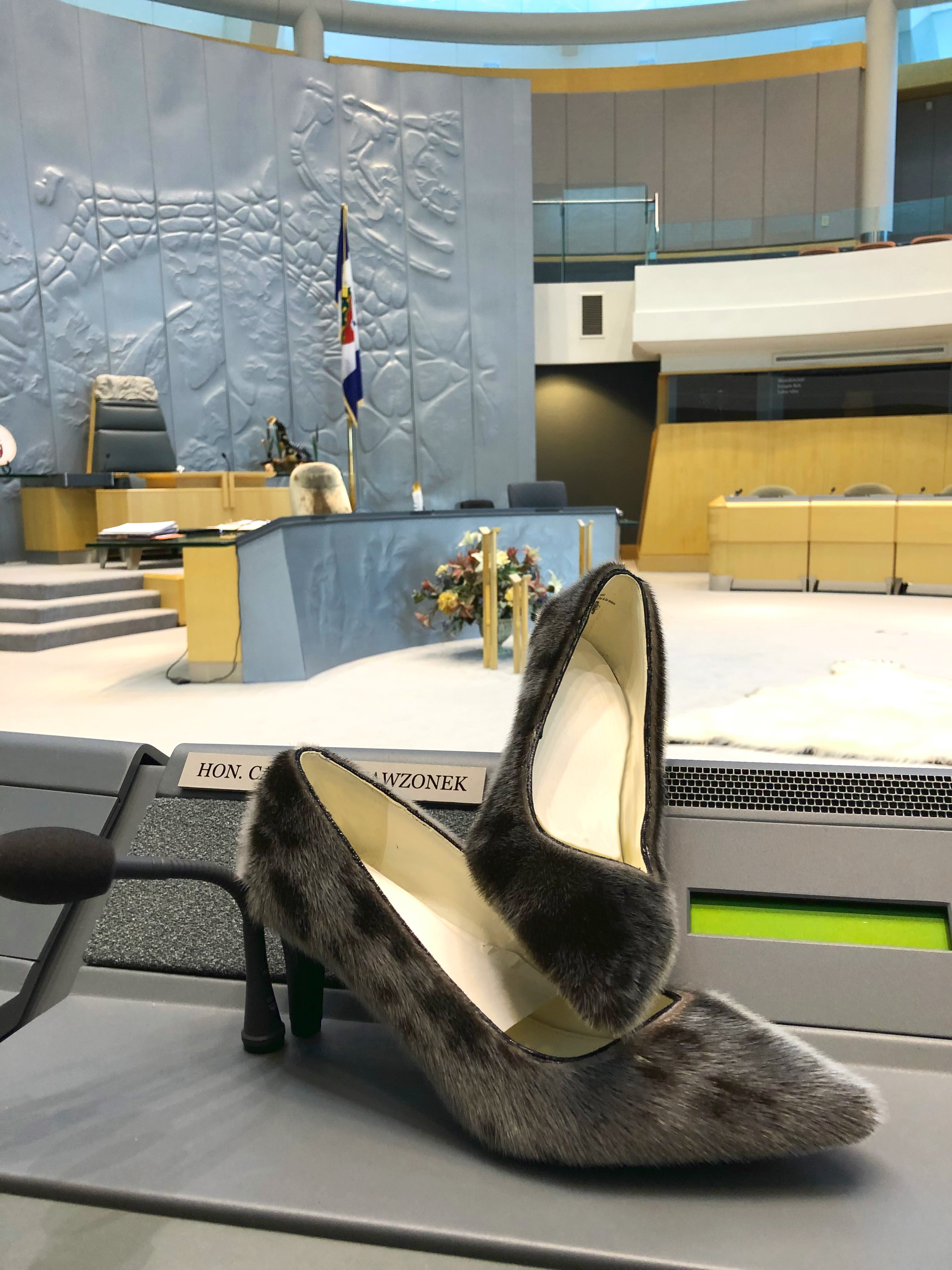
Northwest Territories Finance Minister Caroline Wawzonek's budget day shoes in 2020.

New shoes on budget day is an annual tradition among Canadian Ministers of Finance. The tradition holds that the Minister of Finance should purchase or wear new shoes when the budget is delivered.

The exact origins of this tradition are not known. The observance of this tradition has been inconsistent among federal ministers; indeed, for two or three finance ministers, this tradition only holds if "new shoes" is interpreted to mean "new footwear". It also makes appearances among provincial finance ministers.

== History ==
While several Canadian parliamentary traditions have their origins in Britain, new shoes on budget day does not. News stories of the practice have been investigated by the Library of Parliament and by Canadian academics Alex Marland and Mary Francoli. Walter Edward Harris in 1955 was the first Minister of Finance to receive media coverage about the quirky practice, but only that he was wearing old footwear and therefore not following the so-called tradition. Likewise a news story reported that Donald Fleming did not do so in 1960 and again the practice was described in the media as "traditional", with one account claiming that the tradition of wearing "something new" began as early as Sir John Rose's first budget of 1868. The Library of Parliament has no evidence that Rose did so.

Walter L. Gordon, the next Finance Minister, did not wear new shoes for his three budgets from 1963 to 1965, but his successor Mitchell Sharp wore new shoes on budget day in 1966 after he was told that doing so was a tradition; "Later, I learned there was no tradition behind it at all", Sharp said. The following year there were two budgets, one in June where he wore new shoes and one in November. Sharp wore the same pair of shoes in November, as budget day fell on St. Andrew's Day. He said, "being a Scot, and this being the second budget I have presented this year, I am wearing the same shoes that I wore when I presented the budget on June 1."

Following Sharp, Edgar Benson wore a new pair of shoes on budget day in 1968, although he said, "He didn't buy them just for the budget." The following year, he did not wear new shoes when delivering the budget, saying jokingly that he couldn't afford them; in 1970, he proudly displayed his worn soles on budget day.

The next two Finance Ministers, John Turner and Donald Macdonald, are thought to have delivered their budgets without new shoes. Macdonald's successor Jean Chrétien wore new shoes for both of his budgets of 1978. The next minister, John Crosbie, wore used mukluks in 1979 for his only budget. Following Crosbie, Allan MacEachen is believed to have not followed the tradition, but in 1983 his successor, Marc Lalonde, did for his first budget which resulted in considerable controversy when a photojournalist present for the shoes reveal caught a peek of the budget. Michael Wilson wore new shoes for the first five of the seven budgets he presented beginning in 1985. In 1989, Michael Wilson wore Hartt Shoes, which were made at the Hartt Boot & Shoe Company factory in New Brunswick

Wilson's successor, Donald Mazankowski, wore new shoes for his second budget, in 1993. Paul Martin wore new work boots he received as a gift from Chrétien for his first budget, in 1994, but did not wear new footwear with subsequent budgets. John Manley did not wear new shoes for the two budgets he tabled, in 2002 and 2003. His successor, Ralph Goodale, released two budgets in 2004 and 2005, and wore new shoes both times.

Jim Flaherty wore new shoes for his first budget in 2006. For the second one, instead of wearing new shoes, he bought ice skates for his son and resoled his shoes to show that his 2008 budget was fiscally prudent. Flaherty did not purchase new shoes for the second of his two 2011 budgets; however, he did so in 2009, 2010, 2012, 2013 and February 7, 2014.

Flaherty's successor, Joe Oliver, wore New Balance shoes with blue laces to underscore the fact that the Conservatives' 2015 budget was balanced (The party's traditional colour being blue). However, commenters pointed out that the shoes were made in the U.S., by a company that had abandoned Canadian manufacturing 20 years earlier. Liberal finance minister Bill Morneau held photo-ops to reveal his footwear for the 2016, 2017, 2018 and 2019 budgets. There was no budget in 2020 during the COVID-19 pandemic. In 2021, Chrystia Freeland revealed her footwear on Twitter amidst the pandemic and, in 2022, she held a photo-op at a women's shoe store.

Albeit moving the budget day from spring to fall, Finance Minister François-Philippe Champagne continues to follow such tradition. Before publishing his first budget in 2025, he paid a visit to a local shoe factory in Saint-Tite, Quebec for his new shoes.

== New shoes as a symbol ==
Wearing new shoes on budget day (or the refusal to do so) has been used as a symbol by politicians. Stockwell Day's outfit as Alberta Treasurer was intended to highlight "a new direction" for the budget". The tradition has been around for so long that, as Nova Scotia's Steele said after leaving his position, "It's hard to be original ... Every gimmick has been done", and passers by often ask finance ministers in the days before new budgets whether they have purchased new shoes yet.

== Appearances by provincial and territorial Ministers ==
=== British Columbia ===
For her first two provincial budgets, Carole Taylor wore new shoes. For her third budget, she wore new green-coloured shoes to go with the environmental focus of her budget.

In 2005, Colin Hansen wore new running shoes when he released his only budget.

In 2001, Minister of Finance Paul Ramsay wore new shoes when he delivered his budget. His predecessor, Joy MacPhail, did the same with a second-hand set when she tabled her budget.

=== Alberta ===
Once, when he was Alberta Treasurer, Stockwell Day wore inline skates and a helmet when he tabled a budget.

In 2016, New Democratic Party finance Minister Joe Ceci opted to wear his father's old work boots while delivering the NDP's first provincial budget; he opted to donate new work boots to a woman worker associated with Women Building Futures.

=== Ontario ===
For at least one of the budgets he released, Floyd Laughren wore new shoes.

In 2007, Greg Sorbara wore new shoes when he released Ontario's provincial budget.

=== New Brunswick ===
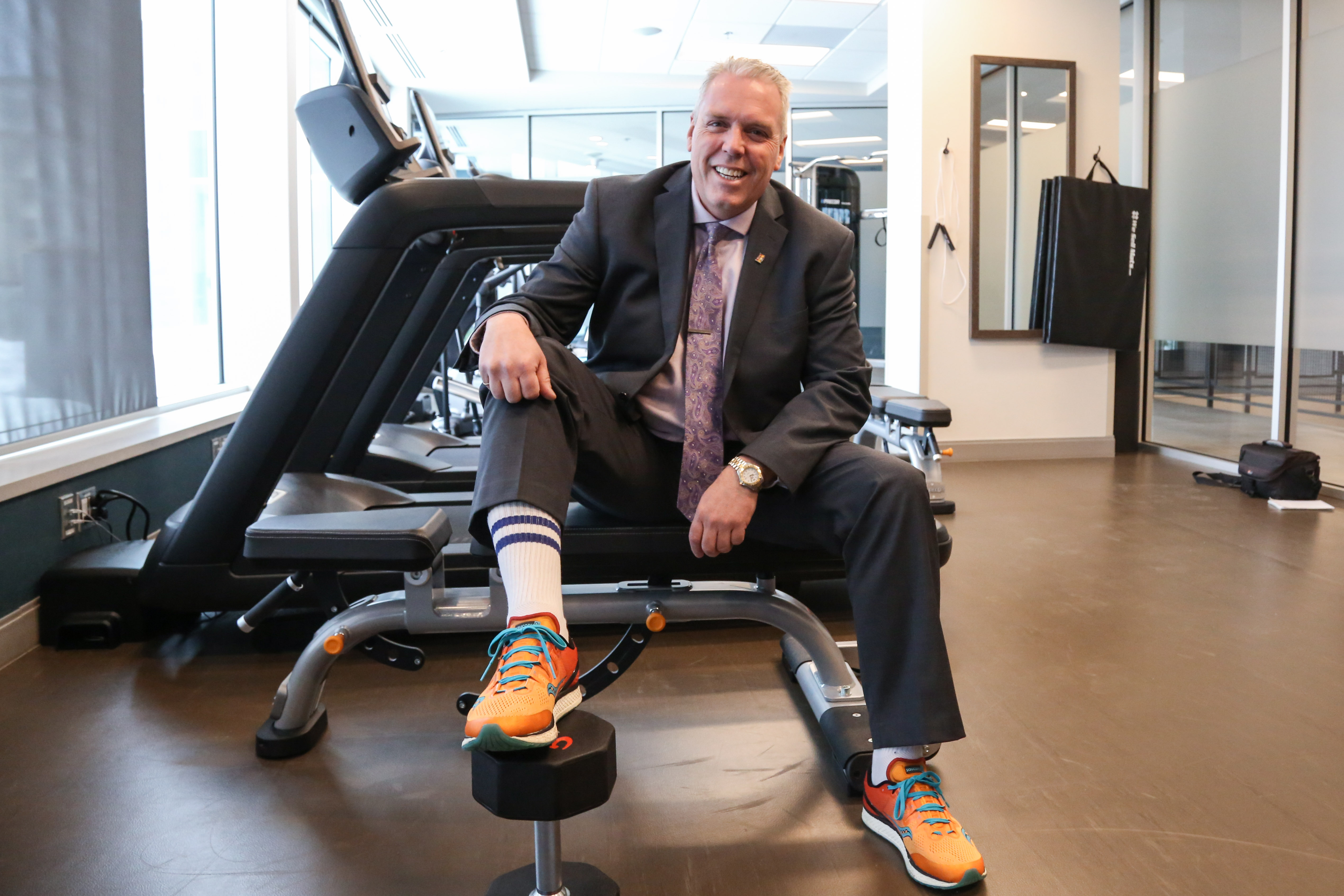
New Brunswick finance minister Ernie Steeves with his new shoes on budget day in 2020.

In 2002, New Brunswick finance minister Peter Mesheau wore new hiking boots when he delivered his budget.

In 2009, Greg Byrne bought a new pair of shoes the day before the budget.

In 2019, Ernie Steeves wore an old pair of shoes. In 2020, he chose a pair of sneakers. In 2021, he picked out refurbished shoes from a store in Fredericton. In 2022, Steeves wore a pair of muddy work boots the day before the budget was announced.

=== Newfoundland and Labrador ===
In 2020, Newfoundland and Labrador Finance Minister Siobhán Coady presented the budget wearing shoes gifted to her by a friend.

=== Nova Scotia ===
In 2009, Nova Scotia finance minister Graham Steele polished his shoes when, as he later said, "we buffed up the previously introduced Progressive Conservative budget". In 2010 he bought children's shoes to represent the removal of the Harmonized Sales Tax from children's clothing. In 2011 Steele showed pictures of new shoes on a Blackberry Playbook because of the manufacturer's importance to the province, and in 2012 he bought shoes at a store to symbolize lowered taxes for small businesses.

=== Quebec ===
In 1989, Quebec Finance Minister Gérard D. Levesque presented the budget in new shoes.

In 2003, Pauline Marois presented Quebec's budget in new shoes.

In 2006, Michel Audet wore new shoes when he delivered his budget speech.

In 2019, Eric Girard wore new running shoes when he delivered his first budget speech

=== Prince Edward Island ===
In 2002, Pat Mella was speaking to journalists about PEI's budget when the Premier interrupted and presented her with a pair of sandals.

=== Saskatchewan ===
Saskatchewan finance minister Ken Krawetz first bought a new pair of shoes for budget day in 2013. He put them on with a shoehorn to demonstrate that the province faces what the minister described as "significant financial pressures on the treasury".

=== Northwest Territories ===
In May 2024, Northwest Territories Finance Minister Caroline Wawzonek wore natural white runners when she tabled her first Budget Address for the 20th Legislative Assembly.

=== Nunavut ===
In 1999, Finance Minister Kelvin Ng wore caribou-skin boots when he tabled Nunavut's budget.

=== Yukon ===
In 2018, Premier Sandy Silver delivered the budget after gifting work boots to a "local organization".
