= Canada Child Benefit =

Monthly Child Benefit for Parents in Canada

The Canada Child Benefit (CCB), previously the Canada Child Tax Benefit (CCTB), is an income-tested basic income program for Canadian families. It is delivered as a tax-free monthly payment available to eligible Canadian families to help with the cost of raising children. The CCTB could incorporate the National Child Benefit (NCB), a monthly benefit for low-income families with children, and the Child Disability Benefit (CDB), a monthly benefit for families caring for children with severe and prolonged mental or physical disabilities.

== History ==
=== Family Allowances (1945–1992) ===
==== Initial program implementation (1945–1949) ====
The federal family allowance program began in July 1945 when the Family Allowances Act 1944 came into force. Children aged 0 to 15 are admissible and allowances are modulated according to the child's age. (Note: Beginning at $5 per month, for children aged 0–5, increasing to $8 for 13–15 year old children.) The program is administrated by the Department of National Health and Welfare.

==== Youth Allowances program (1964) ====
Starting September 1, 1964, the federal government launched a youth allowance program for children aged 16 and 17 who are full-time student or have a disability. The amount, set at $10 per month, is paid to the parents of an eligible child who reside in Canada.

Quebec already had a similar program since September 1, 1961 and opts out of the federal program, obtaining instead a 3% personal income tax fiscal abatement.

==== Reform (1973–1974) ====
In September 1973 the federal government streamlined the allowances program: all child aged 0 to 15 would receive $12 per month.

The program is substantially modified on January 1, 1974: eligibility is extended to 16 and 17 years old, the allowance becomes taxable for income tax purposes and is indexed to CPI starting in January 1975. The Youth Allowance program is abolished, Quebec decides to keep the special tax abatement it obtained in 1964 and to refund it entirely to the federal government.

The Quebec government reforms its own family allowances program to harmonize it with the federal government's program, while deciding to modulate the amount of the allowance based on the number of children in the household (as the federal program permits).

=== Child Tax Benefit (CTB, 1993–1998) ===
The federal finance minister, Don Mazankowski, announced in the 1992 Canadian federal budget the introduction in January 1993 of a renewed and enriched Child Tax Benefit (CTB) that consolidates the family allowance, the child credit and refundable child tax credit into a unified benefit of $1,020 per child (with a supplementary benefit of $75 for the third child and following children). Unlike family allowance that it replaces, this monthly payment is not taxable for the recipient. This measure was estimated to increase benefits by $2.1 billions over a period of five years.

==== Working Income Supplement (WIS) ====
The new benefit includes an earned-income supplement (referred to as the Working income supplement or WIS in future federal budgets) of up to $500 (per family) designed to deliver increased benefits for low-income working families with children. The supplement phases-in at 8% of earned income above $3,750; reaches its maximum amount ($500) between $10,000 and $20,921 of earned income and is subsequently reduced by 10% of earning income above $20,921 (i.e. is fully exhausted at $25,921 of earned income). (Note: C and D parameters of section 122.61(1) of the Income Tax Act, as read after the changes brought forward by S.C. 1992, ch. 48.)

The law implementing the new benefit is adopted by the House of Commons in September 1992 and received royal assent on October 15, 1992. The National Council on Social Welfare supported the reform as a step in the right direction but pointed out that most families receiving social assistance payments or unemployment insurance payments would not be eligible to the earned-income supplement, hence reducing the impact of the new benefit in reducing child poverty.

However, it has been found that, due to cutbacks to social assistance, the impact of this program in reducing child poverty is negligible.

The maximum amount of the WIS was increased in the 1996 Canadian federal budget, reaching $750 in July 1997 and $1,000 in July 1998.

=== Canada Child Tax Benefit (CCTB, 1998–2016) ===
The federal finance minister, Paul Martin, announced in the 1997 Canadian federal budget the gradual replacement of the Child Tax Benefit by a new Canada Child Tax Benefit (CCTB) that combines the CTB and the WIS into a single enhance payment to increase benefit levels for low-income families. The roll-out of the CCTB was scheduled in two steps:

- First in July 1997 with the increase of the WIS;
- Secondly on July 1, 1998, with the enactment of the new Canada Child Tax Benefit.

The CCTB was enacted in response to a commitment made by the Canadian parliament, in November 1989, to eradicate child poverty in Canada by the year 2000.

==== Enhancement of the WIS (1997) ====
The WIS was greatly enhanced following the passage of the 1997 Canadian federal budget:

- The WIS is computed on a per-child basis rather than a per-family basis;
- Maximum benefit level is raised to:
  - $605 for the first child;
  - $405 for the second child;
  - $330 for any additional child.
- Phase-in is faster so that the income level at which the benefits are maximized remains $10,000.
- Phase-out is also faster (12.1% for one-child families, 20.2% for two-child families and 26.8% otherwise) but the income level at which the benefits are entirely exhausted remains $25,921.

==== Enactment of the CCTB (1998) ====
Under the new system, the CCTB have two main components:

- The base benefit (that replaced the CTB) that is available to families with income up to $67,000.
- The NCB supplement (that replaced the WIS) targeted towards low-income families (up to $25,921).

Benefits under the CCTB are increased to provide up to $1,625 for the first child and $1,425 for each additional child. (Note: This level of benefits applies to family with income up to $20,921.)

The 1999 Canadian federal budget increased the NCB supplement by $350 ($180 in July 1999, $170 in July 2000) and the income level where the base benefit starts to phase out and the NCB supplement fully phases out increased from $25,921 to $29,590 by July 2000.

The reform is part of a proposed National Child Benefit (NCB) System based on collaboration between federal, provincial and territorial governments whereas the federal government strengthen the federal benefit and provincial and territorial government can provide additional benefits and services to low-income families.

=== Universal Canada Child Benefit (UCCB, 2006–2016) ===
Following the 2006 Canadian federal election, the new conservative government led by Stephen Harper created the Universal Canada Child Benefit (UCCB), a new benefit of up to $1,200 annually for children under 6. Unlike other benefits, the UCCB is a taxable payment that is included in the recipient income.

The Universal Child Care Benefit Act received royal assent on June 22, 2006, and the UCCB was paid for the first time in July 2006.

In the 2010 Canadian federal budget the UCCB was made shareable between shared-custody parents, and in that instance the payment was evenly split between parents (each receiving $50 per month). The measure entered into force in July 2011.

A significant expansion of the UCCB was announced in November 2014 in the Fall Fiscal Update:

- The UCCB amount for children under 6 would be increased from $1,200 to $1,920 on an annual basis;
- The UCCB would be extended to children aged 6 through 17 with a yearly benefit of $720. That new benefit would replace the Child Tax Credit starting in 2015.

The changes were incorporated in the Economic Action Plan 2015 Act, No. 1 which received royal assent on June 23, 2015, and entered into force on July 1, 2015 (even though the new amounts were enacted as of January 1, 2015).

The UCCB remained unchanged until June 30, 2016, when the benefit was terminated and replaced by the Canada Child Benefit.

=== Canada Child Benefit (CCB, since 2016) ===
Canada Child Tax Benefit was eliminated in 2016 and replaced by the Canada Child Benefit (CCB), a tax-free payment targeting low- and middle-income families; those with incomes higher than CA$150,000 will receive less than the previous system. In 2018-19 benefit year, the CCB payments are up to CA$6,496 per year per child under the age of six, and up to CA$5,481 per year per child aged six to 17 in benefit year 2018-19. The CCB is income-dependent; the first income threshold for families to receive Canada Child Benefit is $30,450 and the second threshold is $65,975 in 2018-19. Since its inception, the Canada Child Benefit has lifted about 300,000 children out of poverty, and has helped reduce child poverty by 40% from 2013 to 2017. The budget for Canada Child Benefit has been increased in 2019, increasing the annual benefit to a maximum of $6,639 for children under six and $5,602 for ages six through 17, allowing parents to provide more due to the increased cost of living.

== See also ==
- Child tax credit (United States)
- Basic income
- Child benefit
- Guaranteed minimum income
