= 1994 Canadian federal budget =

First government spending plan under Paul Martin

1994 Budget of the Canadian Federal Government
- Presented: 22 February 1994
- Country: Canada
- Parliament: 35th
- Party: Liberal
- Finance minister: Paul Martin
- Total revenue: 130.791 billion
- Total expenditures: 167.423 billion
- Deficit: $36.632 billion

The Canadian federal budget for fiscal year 1994–95 was presented by Minister of Finance Paul Martin in the House of Commons of Canada on 22 February 1994. It was the first federal budget under the premiership of Jean Chrétien.

== Background ==
The budget was tabled only a few months after the 1993 Canadian federal election in which the Liberal Party led by Jean Chrétien received a large majority of the seats in the House of Commons. Paul Martin, Chrétien's main rival in the 1990 Liberal Party leadership election was appointed Minister of Finance.

=== February 8 Prime Ministerial Statement ===
On 8 February 1994, the prime minister Jean Chrétien delivered a surprise prime ministerial statement in the House of Commons to announce a federal action plan on tobacco smuggling:

Therefore, much as we may all regret the necessity of lowering cigarette taxes, we must do so at least until we have put the smuggling networks out of business. Then we will be able to restore the appropriate level of taxation that the situation needs.

— Jean Chrétien

Excise taxes on tobacco were dramatically reduced, with additional reductions in provinces that agreed to reduce their provincial excise taxes. (Note: Ontario, Quebec, Nova Scotia, New Brunswick and Prince Edward Island will all ultimately lower their provincial excise taxes and benefit for a dollar-for-dollar additional reduction in the federal excise taxes on tobacco sold in their province.) Additional excise taxes were to be imposed on exported tobacco products, along with a surtax on tobacco manufacturing profits. (Note: The surtax is designated as the health promotion surtax in the Prime Minister statement.)

== Taxes ==
=== Personal income taxes ===
The budget reduced or repealed several tax incentives:

- The $100,000 lifetime capital gains exemption was repealed;
- The first $25,000 of employer-provided life insurance was to be considered a taxable benefit;
- The age tax credit was reduced;
- Only 50% of meals and entertainment expenses could be deducted (down from 80% pre-budget). (Note: Also applicable for corporations.)

=== Corporate income taxes ===
The budget also reduced several tax incentives:

- Investment Tax Credits rates were reduced;
  - The Special Investment Tax Credit and the regional component in respect of R&D were eliminated;
- R&D expenses and the small business deduction calculations were tightened for private corporations;
- New rules were implemented to limit tax avoidance during divisive corporate reorganizations.

=== GST and other taxes ===
Along with the reduction in the deductibility of meals and entertainment expenses, the proportion of GST that could be claimed on these expenses as an input tax credit was also reduced to 50%.

== Expenditures ==
The budget reduced planned federal spending by a net $17.0 billion over the three fiscal years from 1994-95 to 1996-97, after new initiatives were funded through reallocations and other savings. Net revenue measures over the same period totalled $3.4 billion, which the budget document presented as five dollars of spending cuts for every dollar of deficit reduction on the revenue side. Total program spending was projected to remain at about $122.5 billion in each of the three years.

=== Transfers to provinces ===
The budget announced the freezing of Canada Assistance Plan (CAP) payments to their 1994-95 levels after March 31, 1995. Unlike the 1990 restrictions, all provinces (including those receiving equalization payments) were affected by the cap.

The Reform Party (then the third party by number of seats in the House) supported reductions to the CAP while criticizing that the cutbacks were not matched by amendments to health national standards to give more freedom to provinces in adjusting the services they provide.

The government described the freeze as a two-year period of predictability and modest growth in social security transfers while reform was pursued with the provinces, and projected savings of at least $1.5 billion in 1996-97.

== Aftermath ==
=== Legislative history ===
==== Budget Implementation Act, 1994 ====
The main provisions of the budget were included in the Budget Implementation Act, 1994 which was adopted in third reading by the House of Commons on 31 May 1994 and received royal assent on 15 June 1994. Votes followed party lines with the notable exception of independent Québec MP Gilles Bernier (Beauce) voting in favor.

House of Commons vote on the Budget Implementation Act, 1994
Party	Yea	Nay	Abstention	Absent
Liberals	136	0	8	33
Bloc Québécois	0	43	8	3
Reform	0	40	0	12
New Democratic	0	8	0	1
Progressive Conservative	0	0	0	2
Independents	1	0	0	0
Total	137	91	16	49

==== Other bills ====
Income tax measures were implemented through Bill C-59, which was read a third time and passed on 21 February 1995 in a 129–64 vote and received royal assent on 26 March 1995. Changes announced in the 8 February Statement and the reduction of the GST input tax credits claimable on meal and entertainment expenses were legislated through Bill C-35, which received royal assent on 23 June 1994.

Third reading vote on Bill C-59
Party	Yea	Nay	Abstention	Absent
Liberals	129	0	17	31
Bloc Québécois	0	25	17	11
Reform	0	33	0	19
New Democratic	0	6	0	3
Progressive Conservative	0	0	0	2
Independents	0	0	0	2
Total	129	64	34	68

== Notes and references ==
=== References ===
==== Budget documents ====
- Budget Speech (PDF). Ottawa. 22 February 1994.
- Budget Plan (PDF). Ottawa. 22 February 1994.
- Budget in Brief (PDF). Ottawa. 22 February 1994.

==== Enacted legislations ====
- Budget Implementation Act, 1994, S.C. 1994, c. 18
- An Act to amend the Excise Tax Act, the Excise Act and the Income Tax Act, S.C. 1994, c. 29
- An Act to amend the Income Tax Act and the Income Tax Application Rules, S.C. 1995, c. 3
