= 2010 Canadian federal budget =

2010 Budget of the Canadian Federal Government
- Presented: 4 March 2010
- Country: Canada
- Parliament: 40th
- Party: Conservative
- Finance minister: Jim Flaherty
- Total revenue: C$231.4 billion
- Total expenditures: C$280.5 billion
- Deficit: C$33.3 billion

The Canadian federal budget for the 2010–11 fiscal year (April 1, 2010 – March 31, 2011) was presented to the House of Commons of Canada by Finance Minister Jim Flaherty on March 4, 2010 after returning from a two-month prorogued parliament.

== Areas of direction ==
- $3.2 billion in personal income tax relief.
- Over $4 billion in actions to create and protect jobs.
- $7.7 billion in infrastructure stimulus to create jobs.
- Nearly $2 billion to help create the "Economy of Tomorrow"
- $2.2 billion to support industries and communities.
- Fiscal spending of $1.6 billion on unemployment benefits and $1 billion in new skills and training programs.
- Youth-related spending of $108 million

During the budget speech on 4 March 2010, Flaherty announced the use of a polymer substrate for the upcoming Frontier Series of banknotes of the Canadian dollar and that future versions of the loonie ($1 coin) and toonie ($2 coin) would be made of steel instead of nickel to reduce manufacturing costs.

The New Democrats and Bloc Quebecois voted against the budget, which passed due to 30 Liberal abstentions.
