= Established Programs Financing =

The Established Programs Financing (EPF; French: Financement des programmes établis) was a financing program created by the Trudeau government in 1977, to finance the provincially-run healthcare and high-education system, through transfer payments, by cash and tax points.

The 1995 Canadian federal budget announced that both the Established Programs Financing and the Canada Assistance Plan would be combined into a new block-fund fiscal arrangement called the Canada Health and Social Transfer starting in 1996–97 fiscal year.

== History ==
=== Negotiation and inception (1976-1977) ===
The Established Programs Financing (EPF) arrangements were first presented and proposed to the provinces at a First Minister's Conference on 14 June 1976.

The first agreement on EPF was reached in 1977 and set to expired in 1987. It stipulated that increases in the program were tied to the growth in the national economy.

The agreement was legislated through the Federal-Provincial Fiscal Arrangements and Established Programs Financing Act, 1977 (Note: This Act was renamed Federal-Provincial Fiscal Arrangements and Federal Post-Secondary Education and Health Contributions Act, 1977 in 1984.) which received royal assent on 31 March 1977.

=== Cuts to the program (1983-1991) ===
The EPF was subjected to multiple rounds of cuts since the mid 1980s, under both Liberal and Progressive-Conservative governments. Starting on 1 April 1983, EPF growth was restricted to the lower of GDP growth (Note: Technically the average GDP per capita growth rate over the preceding 3 years.) and a maximum escalator rate of 6%. That rate was further lowered to 5% starting on 1 April 1984.

In the 1985 federal budget, Finance Minister Michael Wilson announced a plan to limit the rate of the growth of EPF to save $2 billion by fiscal year 1990–91. The savings are achieved by modifying the escalation clause: for fiscal years 1986–87 through 1989–90 the maximum escalator rate is repealed but the escalation only considers GDP growth above 2%. EPF growth rate was further reduced by 1% in the 1989 budget resulting in additional savings of $200 million in 1990–91.

The 1990 budget froze EPF per-capita entitlements through fiscal year 1991–92, a measure implemented by the Government Expenditure Restraint Act that received royal assent on 1 January 1991. A few weeks later Wilson announced in the 1991 budget that EPF entitlements would be frozen through fiscal year 1994–95 and would then resume growth based on GDP per capital growth minus 3%. The measure was implemented by the Budget Implementation Act, 1991 which received royal assent on 17 December 1991.

== Description ==
=== Funded programs ===
The EPF program provided provinces with a federal contribution to fund:

- Hospital Insurance;
- Medicare;
- Post-Secondary Education;
- Extended Care.

While the first three components were funded under various arrangements prior to the EPF, the last element was added during the negotiations upon a proposal by Minister of National Health and Welfare Marc Lalonde to broaden the range of health program eligible for federal funding. The Extended Health Care program paid provinces $20 per capita in its first year of operation (1977-78) and covered:

- Nursing homes (intermediate care);
- Adult residential care;
- Converted mental hospitals;
- Home care;
- Ambulatory health care.

Some of these activities were previously covered by the Canada Assistance Plan (CAP). For instance the 1977-78 Quebec budget estimated that new funding under Extended Care would bring in $125 millions while $103 millions were removed from CAP entitlements, limiting new funding to $22 millions.

=== Structure ===
The EPF was allocated on an identical per-capita basis to all provinces. It consisted of two components: cash transfers and tax transfers.

==== Tax tranfers ====
At the end of the negotiations establishing the EPF program the federal government reduced its personal and corporate income tax rates so that the provinces could raise them by a commensurate amount. The federal government was in turn able to calculate the revenues it had foregone in subsequent years as the amount transferred under the tax transfer portion.

Should the yield of the tax transfer diminish (for instance during a recession, as was the case in the early 1980s) the amount of the cash portion would increase so that the total EPF entitlement was maintained. Cash transfers could be reduced in the opposite situation.

As part of the 1977 agreement the federal government agreed to transfer 13.5 personal income tax points and 1 corporate income tax point (Note: As the previous Post-Secondary Education funding agreement had already transferred 4.357 personal tax points and 1 corporate tax point, the EPF tax transfer resulted in a reduction of personal income taxes of 9.143%.) to the provinces.

As Quebec was the only province to request a contract-out arrangement with the federal government in the 1960s, it had obtained a 16 personal income tax points transfer for Hospital Insurance. As part of the EPF arrangements Quebec obtained an additional special abatement of 8.5 tax points. As this special abatement was subtracted from the EPF cash transfer, Quebec received – on a per-capital basis – the same EPF funding as all the other provinces.

=== National standards ===
While the EPF was a block-funded (as opposed to a cost-sharing) agreement and gave the provinces more autonomy over the management of their health programs, it still set out terms and conditions (Note: Also often referred to as national standards.) the provinces still had to follow guidelines to be eligible to receive the cash component of the EPF. The conditions were not outlined in the Federal-Provincial Fiscal Arrangements and Established Programs Financing Act, 1977 but rather in the Hospital Insurance and Diagnostic Services Act and the Medical Care Act.

==== Enforcement ====
It was however unclear whether the federal government had the authority to enforce these conditions. Indeed in the years following the EPF arrangements most provinces authorized extra-billing and 7 provinces also started to levy user charges (Note: Newfoundland, New Brunswick, Quebec, Ontario, Saskatchewan, Alberta and British Columbia.)

In 1984 the federal government enacted the Canada Health Act (CHA) as a replacement for both the Hospital Insurance and Diagnostic Services Act and the Medical Care Act which allows the federal government to withhold all or part of transfer payments in case of non-compliance with the criteria outlined in the CHA.

=== Statistics ===
During its first year the EPF resulted in a lower cash transfer to provinces as the tax transfers was significantly larger than under the previous arrangements. In total EPF cash transfers amounted to:

- Medicare: $598 millions;
- Hospital Insurance: $1,662 millions;
- Extended Care: $466 millions;
- Post-secondary Education (PSE): $1,100 millions.

Canada Assistance Plan transfers also decreased in the first year of operation of the EPF as some expenditures it covered were now covered under the Extended Care transfer.

All health-related transfers were allocated to the Ministry of National Health and Welfare's budget whereas PSE was allocated to the Secretary of State's budget.

== See also ==
=== Bibliography ===
- MacEachen, Allan J. (23 April 1981). Federal-provincial fiscal arrangements in the eighties (PDF). Ottawa: Department of Finance.

=== Related links ===
- Territorial Formula Financing
