= 1991 Canadian federal budget =

1991 Budget of the Canadian Federal Government
- Presented: 26 February 1991
- Country: Canada
- Parliament: 34th
- Party: Progressive Conservative
- Finance minister: Michael Wilson
- Total revenue: 126.086 billion
- Total expenditures: 158.405 billion
- Deficit: $32.319 billion

The Canadian federal budget for fiscal year 1991–92 was presented by Minister of Finance Michael Wilson in the House of Commons of Canada on 26 February 1991.

== Taxes ==
The budget did not bring sweeping tax changes after the consequential 1987 Income tax reform and the introduction of the GST on January 1, 1991.

=== Personal income taxes ===
Minor changes focused on improving tax incentives to disabled individuals and included:

- Increase to the Disability Tax Credit from $575 to $700 and indexation after the 1991 Fiscal year;
- Amendments to the medical expenses deduction rules to include previously non-deductible expenses (for instance part-time attendant care, trained service animals, incontinence products);
- Costs incurred by businesses to modify their premises to accommodate disabled persons are now fully deductible in the year of installation;
- Changes to taxable benefits rules to exclude reasonable amounts provided for the transportation of disabled employees.

=== Corporate income taxes ===
The budget announced a restriction on the deductibility of provincial payroll and capital taxes. ndeed, these taxes – unlike provincial corporate income taxes − were considered fully deductible expenses for federal income tax purposes. Several provinces (for instance, Ontario) raised their payroll taxes in the early 1990s to raise additional revenues. This, while minimizing impact on businesses that could partially offset the increase by claiming a federal tax deduction. These deductions were costing the federal government about $700 million per year.

The budget laid out the following provisions:

- A cap of $10,000 for the deductibility of provincial payroll and capital taxes;
- A 6% tax allowance for taxable income in excess of the $10,000 cap;
- The new measures are phased-in over 1992 and 1993 with full effect to take place on January 1, 1994:
  - In 1992 corporations are allowed to deduct 2/3 of provincial capital and payroll taxes and the lesser of 1/3 of the taxes paid or $10,000. The tax allowance is set at 2%;
  - In 1993 they are allowed 1/3 of provincial taxes and the lesser of 2/3 of the taxes paid or $10,000. The tax allowance is set at 4%;
  - In 1994 the lesser of the taxes paid or $10,000 is deductible and the allowance is set at 6%.

The $10,000 limit would preserve deductibility for 80% of businesses (those with a payroll less than $750,000 a year) and the 6% tax allowance would ensure Ottawa would not collect additional taxes for the 20% remaining businesses if the payroll and capital taxes rate remain at their budget date level.

Legislation to implement these measures was indefinitely delayed and they have never been in effect for capital taxes.

=== Excise taxes ===
Effective February 27, 1991:

- Excise tax on cigarettes is increased by 3%;
- Excise tax on cigares is increased from 40 to 65% of the price.

== Expenditures ==
The budget announces that the Expenditure Control Plan unveiled in the previous budget is extended:

- The 5%-growth ceiling for CAP payments to Ontario, Alberta and BC is extended for 3 additional years;
- Freeze on EPF per-capital entitlements extended throughout 1994-95 and capped at GDP growth minus 3% thereafter;
- Several programs are frozen (PUITTA, Telefilm Canada, loans financing by EDC);
- Previously announced projects are cancelled (contribution to the Toronto Ballet Opera House) or delayed (contribution to new concert halls in Edmonton and Montreal, cultural research institute in Montreal);
- Expenditures for the Green Plan are spread over 6 years instead of 5. Budget for 1991-92 is cut by 125 millions;
- Funds for the Canadian Job Strategy are reduced by 100 millions.

Additional cuts amount to 1.2 billions in 1991-92 and 14.8 billions over five years.

== Aftermath ==
=== Legislative history ===
- Provisions pertaining to federal transfers to provinces (EPF and PUITTA) and Unemployment Insurance were contained in the Budget Implementation Act, 1991 which received royal assent on 17 December 1991.
  - It is the first time the Budget Implementation Act designation is used to designate a legislation brought forward to implement budget measures.
- Additional expenditure control measures are included in the Bill C-56 (named the Spending Control Act) which was read a third time and adopted by the House of Commons on 27 April 1992 in a 137–84 vote (with 12 paired votes) and received royal assent on 18 June 1992.

No legislation was ultimately brought forward to restrict the deductibility of provincial payroll and capital taxes.

== Notes and references ==
=== References ===
==== Budget documents ====
- The Budget (PDF). Ottawa. 26 February 1991.
- The Budget Speech (PDF). Ottawa. 26 February 1991.
- The Budget in Brief (PDF). Ottawa. 26 February 1991.
- Main estimates
  - 1991-92 Estimates. Vol. Part I — The Government Expenditure Plan. Ottawa: Supply and Services Canada. 1991. ISBN 0-660-56383-5.

==== Enacted legislations ====
- An Act to amend the Income Tax Act, the Canada Pension Plan, the Cultural Property Export and Import Act, the Income Tax Conventions Interpretation Act, the Tax Court of Canada Act, the Unemployment Insurance Act, the Canada-Newfoundland Atlantic Accord Implementation Act, the Canada-Nova Scotia Offshore Petroleum Resources Accord Implementation Act and certain related Acts, S.C. 1991, c. 49
- Budget Implementation Act, 1991, S.C. 1991, c. 51
- Spending Control Act, S.C. 1992, c. 19
