= 1999 Canadian federal budget =

Sixth government spending plan under Paul Martin

1999 Budget of the Canadian Federal Government
- Presented: 16 February 1999
- Country: Canada
- Parliament: 36th
- Party: Liberal
- Finance minister: Paul Martin
- Total revenue: 176.408 billion
- Total expenditures: 162.150 billion
- Surplus: $14.258 billion

The Canadian federal budget for fiscal year 1999–2000 was presented by Minister of Finance Paul Martin in the House of Commons of Canada on 16 February 1999.
