= 1995 Canadian federal budget =

Second government spending plan under Paul Martin

1995 Budget of the Canadian Federal Government
- Presented: 27 February 1995
- Country: Canada
- Parliament: 35th
- Party: Liberal
- Finance minister: Paul Martin
- Total revenue: 140.257 billion
- Total expenditures: 170.263 billion
- Deficit: $30.006 billion

The Canadian federal budget for fiscal year 1995–96 was presented by Minister of Finance Paul Martin in the House of Commons of Canada on 27 February 1995.

== Background ==
The budget is presented in a context of a fast-growing US economy and moderate inflation but a severe increase in interest rates that started in early 1994 dramatically increased public debt charges and in turn reduced budgetary margin for the Liberal government.

== Taxes ==
The capital gains exemption is maintained for farming and small businesses.

=== Cost recovery initiatives ===
In order to increase revenues, the budget plans for new cost recovery and user fees initiatives, notably:

- A new immigration fee of $975 per adult;
- Increased fees for citizenship;
- Increase in the interest rate charged by Revenue Canada for late payments on taxes, CPP and EI contributions;
- Increased cost recovery for the provision of consular and trade development services;
- Introduction of fees for commercial products provided by Environment Canada.

These initiatives were to generate $450 million in annual revenues in 1995–96 and up to $600 million when fully implemented.

== Expenditures ==
=== Program spending ===
==== Administrative measures ====
The budget announces massive cuts to program expenditures, amounting to 18.9% by 1997–98. A new Expenditure Management System (EMS) was announced prior to the budget announcement on February 15 by Art Eggleton, the President of the Treasury Board. The EMS aimes to implement a new results-based approach to public management and strict cost control.

The $2 banknote is discontinued and replaced by a $2 coin starting in early 1996.

Other administrative restructuring is also announced in the budget:

- Integration of the Canadian Coast Guard into Fisheries and Oceans Canada;
- Clarification of responsibilities pertaining to freshwater and marine areas between Fisheries and Oceans Canada and Transport Canada;
- Elimination of 73 agencies, restructuring of another 47 (by merger or streamlined operations) and abolition of 665 Governor-in-Council positions. (Note: i.e. positions appointed by an order in Council.)

==== Cuts to business subsidies ====
The most dramatic cuts are related to subsidies to business organizations, with a scheduled cut amounting to 60.4% between 1994–95 and 1997–98.

- Effective August 1, 1995 the annual subsidy of $560 millions to the railway companies is eliminated;
  - The federal government budgeted a $1.6 billion one-time payment as compensation for land owner whose land values are affected by the abolition of freight subsidies.
- Subsidies for Atlantic region freight are abolished starting on July 1, 1995;
- Dairy and other agricultural subsidies are to be reduced by 30% over 2 years;
- Subsidies to cultural industries are to be reduced, including an-8% reduction in the postal subsidies for Canadian books and magazines.
- Industry Canada is scheduled to terminate 44 of its 54 business subsidies programs.

=== Transfers to provinces ===
==== Creation of the Canada Social Transfer ====
The budget announced major changes to transfers to provinces. Up until 1995, transfers consisted mostly of:

- Established Programs Financing (EPF) a block transfer established in 1977 to fund post-secondary education and healthcare.
- Canada Assistance Plan (CAP) a cost-sharing program to fund social services and social assistance.
- The Equalization program which was renewed unchanged for five years prior to the 1995 budget.

The budget announced that the first two programs are to be combined into a single block transfer called the Canada Health and Social Transfer (CHST) (Note: Called the Canada Social Transfer in budget documents.) starting in the fiscal year 1996–97. In the budget the CHST is designated as Canada Social Transfer (CST) which coincidentally is the name of a successor transfer to the CHST.

==== Other changes ====
The Public Utilities Income Tax Transfer Act (PUITTA) is suspended after April 1, 1995 and the PUITTA is repealed on March 31, 1999, providing the federal government with more than $200 million in annual savings.

=== Privatization ===
The budget announced the privatization efforts were to continue with multiple state-owned corporations to be sold to the private sector. (Note: The budget lists notably : Petro-Canada, Canadian National, the Air Navigation System (ANS) within Transport Canada and the Canada Communication Group.)

Many other federal departments and agencies were to operate on a more commercial basis.

== Legislative history ==
Most of the content of the budget was included in the Bill C-76 (An Act to implement certain provisions of the budget tabled in Parliament on February 27, 1995) that was adopted by the House of Commons on 6 June 1995. Reform, Bloc, NDP and one of the two Progressive-conservative (Elsie Wayne) MPs voted against the budget while Gilles Bernier (the only independent MP elected in 1993) and Jag Bhaduria (formerly part of the Liberal caucus), voted in favor like. One Liberal MP (Warren Allmand) voted against the budget, protesting budget cuts and was shortly thereafter relieved of his position as chair of the House of Commons Standing Committee on Justice. The bill received royal assent on 22 June 1995.

House of Commons vote on the Budget Implementation Act, 1995
| Party | Yea | Nay | Abstention | Absent |
|---|---|---|---|---|
| Liberals | 140 | 1 | 13 | 23 |
| Bloc Québécois | 0 | 37 | 14 | 2 |
| Reform | 0 | 40 | 0 | 12 |
| New Democratic | 0 | 6 | 0 | 3 |
| Progressive Conservative | 0 | 1 | 0 | 1 |
| Independents | 1 | 0 | 0 | 0 |
| Total | 141 | 85 | 27 | 42 |
