= Canada Assistance Plan =

The Canada Assistance Plan (CAP; French: Régime d'assistance publique du Canada) was a financing program created in 1966 by the Pearson government. The CAP consisted of a cost-sharing arrangement between the federal government and provinces, territories and municipalities whereby the federal government would partially fund eligible social programs.

The 1995 Canadian federal budget announced that both the Canada Assistance Plan and the Established Programs Financing would be combined into a new block-fund fiscal arrangement called the Canada Health and Social Transfer starting in 1996-97 fiscal year. Payments with respect to fiscal years ending on March 31, 1996, or before could be made until March 31, 2000. The Canada Assistance Plan therefore officially remained under existence until March 31, 2000.

== Structure ==
As of the early 1990s, the Canada Assistance Plan consisted of 3 parts (of which only 2 have ever been enacted):

- Part I (General Assistance and Welfare Services) under which the federal government would cover 50% of eligible costs for social programs (notably financial assistance programs, homes for special care, some health care costs not already covered under the Canada Health Act or other fiscal arrangements and child welfare);
- Part II (Indian Welfare) was never enacted as no agreement had been signed between the federal government and the provinces;
- Part III (Work Activity Projects) under which the federal government would cover 50% of eligible costs for improvement of employability of unemployed people.

== History ==
CAP entitlements from 1967 to 2000
Sitting Government
Liberal
Progressive-Conservative

=== Cuts to the program (1990s) ===
The 1990 Canadian federal budget capped the annual growth of the Canada Assistance Plan at 5% for provinces who did not receive equalization payments (Note: At the time Ontario, Alberta and British Columbia.) for 1990-91 and 1991-92 fiscal years. That decision was incorporated into the Government Expenditure Restraint Act (C-69) that received royal assent on 1 February 1991. The 1991 Canadian federal budget extended the measure through 1994–95.

The government of British Columbia challenged that provision in courts and the Supreme Court of Canada, in the landmark Reference Re Canada Assistance Plan (BC) decision, ruled on 15 August 1991 that the capping was indeed constitutional.

Further restrictions were applied when the 1994 Canadian federal budget froze CAP payments to their 1994-95 levels for the 1995-96 fiscal year. Unlike the 1990 freeze it applied to all the Canadian provinces, including those who received equalization payments.

== Debates ==
From its inception the Canada Assistance Plan was under scrutiny from the federal government. As the arrangement was a cost-sharing program and open-ended in nature, the federal government was concerned about an escalation of costs it could not control.

Despite escalating costs in the early 1980s, the Nielsen Task Force on Program Review (Note: Officially the Ministerial Task Force on Program Review.) found that no serious alternative could replace the CAP.

== Relevance to Individuals with Disabilities and Families ==
One of Calgary, Alberta's Rehabilitation Research Institutes cited the Government of Canada: In 1986 there were over 302,000 children and 2,448,000 adults with developmental disabilities alone in Canada (Profile of Disabled Persons, Ottawa Ministry of Supply and Services, 1986). The Canadian Assistance Plan was a federal-provincial cost sharing arrangement and "supports the provision of adequate assistance to persons in need, and to encourage the development of welfare services that prevent and remove the causes of poverty, child neglect and dependence on social assistance" (Canadian Association of Mental Retardation, Parliamentary Task Force, 1984). Two associated programs for the disabled were: The Vocational Rehabilitation of Disabled Persons for Vocational Training and Education, and the established program funding (EPF) to block grant funds for relatively stabilized programs and services.

The researcher-author, David McClelland, discusses the institutional bias of the Canadian Assistance Plan, and ways it could contribute to individualized rehabilitation funding models in community living. The Rehabilitation Individualized Funding Model of the Western World being proposed at the time is also discussed in Public Administration and Disability: Community Services Administration in the US (Racino, 2014).

== See also ==
- Established Programs Financing
- Territorial Formula Financing
