= Henson trust =

Trust to benefit disabled persons

A Henson trust (sometimes called an absolute discretionary trust), in Canadian law, is a type of trust designed to benefit disabled persons. Specifically, it protects the assets (typically an inheritance) of the disabled person, as well as the right to collect government benefits and entitlements.

The key provision of a Henson trust is that the trustee has "absolute discretion" in determining whether to use the trust assets to provide assistance to the beneficiary, and in what quantity. This provision means that the assets do not vest with the beneficiary and thus cannot be used to deny means-tested government benefits. An example of such a benefit is the Ontario Disability Support Program.

In addition, the trust may provide income tax relief by being taxed at a lower marginal rate than if the beneficiary's total assets were considered. However if the trust was established for a person with a disability in Canada, who has qualified for the Disability Tax Credit the trustees can use the "Preferred Beneficiary election" and attribute the trust income to the beneficiary of the trust without actually paying it out. The trust beneficiary would file a tax return as if they earned the trust income. The trust beneficiary would use their personal exemptions and tax credits to reduce their taxable income. It can also be used to shield assets from matrimonial division in case of divorce of the beneficiary. In most cases, the trust assets are immune from claims by creditors of the beneficiary.

The Henson trust was first used in Ontario in the late 1980s. It became of wider interest when the Supreme Court of Ontario ruled in 1989 that the trust assets were not vested in the beneficiary and thus could not be used to terminate government benefit programs.

A Henson trust can be established as either a living trust, or a testamentary trust.

== The Cases ==
Leonard Henson of Guelph, Ontario had set up an absolute discretionary trust for his daughter. The Ontario Ministry of Community and Social Services took his daughter to court (following a Tribunal decision overruling the case worker), arguing that she had assets. The Divisional Court (a branch of the Ontario Superior Court of Justice), as affirmed by the Court of Appeal for Ontario, ruled that she didn't have assets, as the trustee had no obligation to pay her anything and she had no right to demand anything from the trust.

In 2019, the Supreme Court of Canada in S.A. v. Metro Vancouver Housing Corp., affirmed the Henson Trust. The Supreme Court held that a beneficiary of a Henson Trust has no vested interest in the trust. Further, the Supreme Court explained that the money the beneficiary received from a Henson Trust is not considered an "asset", as it relates to the policy of the Metro Vancouver Housing Corp. The Supreme Court did explain, however, that a social assistance program may explicitly include a Henson Trust as an "asset", at which point the money received may be considered an "asset".
