= Canada Health and Social Transfer =

Former Canadian payment transfer system

The Canada Health and Social Transfer (CHST) was a system of block transfer payments from the Canadian government to provincial governments to pay for health care, post-secondary education and welfare, in place from the 1996–97 fiscal year until the 2004–05 fiscal year. It was split into the Canada Health Transfer (CHT) and Canada Social Transfer (CST) effective April 1, 2004, to provide greater accountability and transparency for federal health funding.

== Background ==
The CHST was announced in the 1995 Canadian federal budget as an amalgamation of two federal programs prior to 1996:

- The Established Programs Financing program, which paid for health care and post-secondary education and was established in 1977;
- And the Canada Assistance Plan, which supported social assistance and was established in 1966.

Under the Constitution of Canada, health, education and social assistance are all areas of provincial responsibility and authority. The federal government does not directly participate in the administration of government services in these areas, though federal money through the CHST and its successors is used to fund them. But unlike equalization payments, which provinces can spend on anything, money distributed through the CHST is conditional and must be spent on health, post-secondary education or welfare. Legislation such as the Canada Health Act specify standards that the provinces must maintain in order to receive funding.

The rate of increase to the amounts in the transfer are driven by economic growth, due to the underlying program being designed on the basis of the "transfer" of tax points, however, occasional supplements to the program can be made either through increases in the base rate, such $11 billion more in funding per year through bilateral amendment agreements in 2016, or through special time-limited funding, such as the 2006 Wait Time Reductions Fund, which provided funding over a decade. The CHST and its successors consist of both cash transfers and tax transfers. Cash transfers are direct transfers of money from the federal government to the provinces. Tax transfers work because both federal and provincial governments collect personal and corporate income tax. A tax transfer involves the federal government reducing its income tax rates, leaving the provinces room ("tax points") by which they can increase their own taxes (and thus their revenues) without increasing the total tax burden on their citizens.

== Criticism ==
The amount of transfer payments from the federal to the provincial governments is always controversial, particularly in the area of health care, which is of particular importance to Canadians. The premiers of Canadian provinces allege that federal funding has decreased markedly since the beginning of publicly funded health care, from fifty to sixteen cents of every dollar. Some argue against the principle of the Canada Health Transfer cash contributions being at 50%, arguing that reforms in 1977 led to the removal of that cost sharing principle due to incorporating the transfer of tax points.

Critics of the CHST, CHT and CST note that the programs have allowed the federal government to interfere in areas of provincial jurisdiction by giving Ottawa a power through the threat of withdrawing the transfers to any province that administers programs contrary to federal requirements.

== See also ==
- Canada Health Act
- Canada Health Transfer
- Indian Health Transfer Policy (Canada)
- Health care in Canada
- Canadian Institute for Health Information
- Canadian and American health care systems compared
- Medicare (Canada)
