= Disability Tax Credit =

Reduction in Canadian taxes for disabled people

The Disability Tax Credit (DTC) is a non-refundable tax credit in Canada for individuals who have a severe and prolonged impairment in physical or mental function. An impairment qualifies as prolonged if it is expected to or has lasted at least 12 months. The DTC is required in order to qualify for the Registered Disability Savings Plan, the working income tax benefit, and the child disability benefit. Families using a Henson trust, the Canada Disability Child Benefit other estate planning methods for children with Disabilities are not excluded from the DTC. While the credit is valuable, many have found qualifying for it challenging.

== Eligibility ==
The individual must be "markedly restricted" in at least one of the following categories: speaking, hearing, walking, elimination (bowel or bladder functions), feeding, dressing, performing the mental functions of everyday life, life-sustaining therapy to support vital function and the recently introduced cumulative effects of significant restrictions. The degree of disability must be approved by Canada Revenue Agency before it can be used, and this process requires the completion and submission of a form. The T2201 Disability Tax Credit Certificate form must be completed by a qualified professional related to the impairment such as a medical doctor, physiotherapist, occupational therapist, psychologist, audiologist, or optometrist, in order to qualify as having a severe and prolonged impairment. The practitioner must certify on the T2201 form that the impairment meets specific conditions within the set category. The conditions vary depending on impairment.

A document released by the Canadian Psychological Association (CPA) in response to suggestions they made to the House of Commons Sub-Committee on the Status of Persons with Disabilities, attempts to assist medical professionals with deciphering what qualifies as being markedly restricted in the "mental functions necessary for everyday life".

In 2005, the CRA introduced a new category of eligibility, "cumulative effect of significant restrictions". This category is useful for individuals who are disabled but not restricted enough to qualify as being markedly restricted. Since this was introduced in 2005, an applicant may only be able to recapture funds since that point.

== Benefits ==
An applicant can file for the disability amount, back 10 years, due to the Tax Payer Relief Provisions in the Income Tax Act. The DTC amounts to C$7,687 (According to line 316) is a non-refundable tax credit and if an individual has enough taxable income, this would result tax savings of 1,153.05, and if filed for the full 10-year period the possible tax savings are excess of 11,000.

The DTC can be found on line 316 (for self) and line 318 (transferred to a supporting relative). If the medical practitioner charges to complete the T2201 form, applicants can claim this as a medical expense on line 330 of his/her tax return.

In addition to lowering taxes, qualifying for tax credits can also be a requirement for applying for other money-saving vehicles such as the Registered Disability Savings Plan.

== Transferring credits ==
If the person with the impairment does not have a taxable income, he/she can transfer credits to a supporting relative such as a parent, grandparent, child, sibling, grandchild, aunt, uncle, niece, or nephew. The disability amount can be transferred in either its entirety or as the remainder of what the dependent was unable to claim himself or herself.

== Association of Canadian Disability Benefit Professionals (ACDBP) ==
An Association of Canadian Disability Benefit Professionals was created to represent and serve a network of organizations that assist clients in registering for the disability tax credit, registered disability savings plan and other disability tax benefits. It was created by the twelve founding organizations specializing in this field. They are all committed to ACDBP Code of Conduct. The Association advocates on behalf of its members for policy and program efficiency at the federal and provincial level.
