= 1990 Canadian federal budget =

1990 Budget of the Canadian Federal Government
- Presented: 20 February 1990
- Country: Canada
- Parliament: 34th
- Party: Progressive Conservative
- Finance minister: Michael Wilson
- Total revenue: CA$119,685,000,000
- Total expenditures: CA$153,584,000,000
- Deficit: CA$33,899,000,000

The Canadian federal budget for fiscal year 1990–91 was presented to the House of Commons of Canada by finance minister Michael Wilson on 20 February 1990. It was the second budget after the 1988 Canadian federal election. Main estimates were tabled in the House of Commons on 22 February 1990.

== Taxes ==
The 1990 budget did not introduce a major tax change, as income taxes were reformed in prior years and the Goods and Service tax was scheduled for implementation on January 1, 1991.

Although not part of the 1990 budget, three major tax changes are implemented as of January 1, 1991:

- The individual surtax on high-income is increased to 5% of federal taxes in excess of $12,500 (instead of 3% of taxes owed over $15,000);
- The Large Corporation Tax introduced in April 1989 is increased to 0.2% of taxable capital over $10 million (instead of 0.175%);
- A new Refundable Goods and Services Tax Credit of $190 per adult replaces the Refundable Sales Tax Credit.

== Expenditures ==
=== Expenditure Control Plan ===
The 1990 budget sets out a control plan for expenditures and was predicted to yield $2.8 billion in savings in fiscal year 1990-1991 and $3.3 billion in fiscal year 1991-1992. This control plan complements the expenditure reductions of December 1989. Most government transfers to individuals, including old age pensions, child allowances, veterans' benefits and unemployment insurance, were not included.

==== 5%-growth ====
Some programs were constrained to a 5%-annual growth until 1992:

- Science and Technology (National Research Council, Canadian Space Agency, Defence Industry Productivity program, Scholarships...);
- Indian and Inuit programs;
- Canada Assistance Plan (CAP, a cost-sharing program consisting of transfers to province for social assistance programs);
- Defence spending;
- Foreign aid

==== Programs frozen until 1992 ====
Some programs are frozen altogether:

- Established Programs Financing (EPF, transfers to provinces for health and post-secondary education);
- Funding to the CBC for acquisition of capital equipment. Previously-announced increases are cancelled;
- Telefilm Canada;
- Export Development Corporation;
- Marine Atlantic (ferry services in Atlantic Canada).

==== Budget cuts ====
Other programs see their funding cut:

- Grants and contributions by the Secretary of State, the Department of Multiculturalism and Citizenship and the Department of National Health and Welfare;
- Social Housing (through the Canada Mortgage and Housing Corporation);
- Funding for small craft harbours.

Several programs are terminated altogether:

- Incentives for exploration of natural resources provided by the Canadian Exploration Incentives Program (CEIP) are eliminated after February 19, 1990. The CEIP was introduced in 1988 to help resource companies raise capital following the market crash of 1987.
- The OSLO Project of development of oil sands in Northeastern Alberta;
- The Polar 8 Project.

== Reactions ==
=== Opposition ===
Herb Gray, interim leader of the Official Opposition, rejected many features of the budget, notably the cuts to transfers to provinces and capping of research and science budget. Paul Martin, Liberal MP and candidate to the leadership of the Liberal Party, also rejected the budget as a symbol of the Conservatives' mismanagement of the economy.

Audrey McLaughlin, leader of the New Democratic Party held that the budget would not help students or homeless people and decried the lack of environmental measures, despite prior ambitious declarations made by the Prime Minister Brian Mulroney and the Minister of Environment Lucien Bouchard.

=== Provinces ===
The budget is characterized by Gérard D. Levesque, Quebec's finance minister, as a smokescreen and an unfair budget. He particularly criticizes the cuts to EPF as a tentative to download the federal deficit onto the provinces and the abolition of the Canadian Exploration Incentives Program that benefited mine exploration in Quebec rural areas (and especially Abitibi). The minister warns that the federal budget will likely lead tax increases for Quebec taxpayers to offset the downfall in revenues.

== Aftermath ==
=== Legislative history ===
Provisions pertaining to the Expenditure Control Plan were included in the Government Expenditures Restraint Act which received royal assent on 1 February 1991. The act legislated cuts to transfers to provinces (CAP, EPF and PUITTA) and the termination of the CEIP.

== Notes and references ==
=== References ===
==== Budget documents ====
- Budget speech and supporting documents
  - Department of Finance (20 February 1990). The budget (PDF). Ottawa: Government of Canada.
  - Department of Finance (20 February 1990). The budget speech (PDF). Ottawa: Government of Canada.
  - Department of Finance (20 February 1990). The budget in brief (PDF). Ottawa: Government of Canada.
- Main estimates
  - 1990-91 Estimates. Vol. Part I — The Government Expenditure Plan. Ottawa: Supply and Services Canada. 1990. ISBN 0-660-55675-8.

==== Enacted legislation ====
- Government Expenditures Restraint Act, S.C. 1991, c. 9
