= Old Age Security =

Canadian pension program

The Old Age Security (OAS, French: Sécurité de la vieillesse) program is a universal retirement pension available to most residents and citizens of Canada who have reached 65 years old. This pension is supplemented by the Guaranteed Income Supplement (GIS), which is added to the monthly OAS payment for seniors with lower incomes. Some low-income spouses and survivors of OAS recipients are eligible to receive an income-tested allowance while they are aged 60 to 64.

== Legal foundation ==
Old Age Security (OAS) is a monthly basic income available to qualifying citizens and permanent residents of Canada who are 65 years old and older. Authorized by section 94A of the Constitution Act, 1867, the program is defined by the Old Age Security Act (R.S.C., 1985, c. O-9). Implementation is the responsibility of the Minister of Employment and Social Development (ESDC). Administration is performed by Service Canada through offices across Canada.

== Enrolment and eligibility ==
Prior to 2013, a person needed to apply to Employment and Social Development Canada (ESDC) and meet the eligibility criteria to receive benefits. Since 2013, the enrolment process has become increasingly automatic as Service Canada are now permitted to use data from Income Tax files. For persons who are not enrolled automatically, a manual application process remains in place.

Eligibility for Old Age Security is straightforward for most Canadians. Persons who have lived outside of Canada can refer to official documentation for details including residency requirements and a list of reciprocal agreements with other countries which may allow pooling of residency periods to increase eligibility for Canadian or foreign pension rights.

Low-income OAS recipients may apply for an additional amount in the form of the Guaranteed Income Supplement (GIS). A domestic partner's income affects the income threshold and payout.

To receive the full OAS pension, a person must have lived in Canada for at least 40 years after turning 18. If less than 40 years after age 18, the amount of partial OAS pension received is prorated, based on the number of years they have lived in Canada divided by 40. For example, a person living in Canada for 34 years after age 18 is eligible for a partial 85% OAS pension (34/40=0.85).

== Payments ==
The pension is paid monthly, on the third business day from the end of the current month. In December, the payment is made about one week earlier than other months. The Government prefers to use Direct Deposit, which has been observed to be consistently executed shortly after midnight Pacific time. This is an unpublished operational detail that ensures all Canadians receive these payments at the same time, regardless of their time zone of residence. There is an official Government of Canada schedule that does not specify the time of day.

The OAS and GIS payment amounts are affected by the age and marital status of the recipient. Amounts are reviewed at the beginning of each calendar quarter, compared to the Consumer Price Index and increased as appropriate.

== Taxation ==
The OAS payout is subject to the pension recovery tax when the Canada Revenue Agency determines that the recipient's taxable income is greater than 80% of Canadians.

The GIS is not taxed. The amount must still be reported in an income tax filing where it becomes a tax deductible.

== See also ==
- Basic income
- Canada Pension Plan, a complementary plan with earnings-based contributions
- Guaranteed minimum income
- Social Security Tribunal of Canada
