= Statutes of Canada =

Compilation of the federal laws of Canada

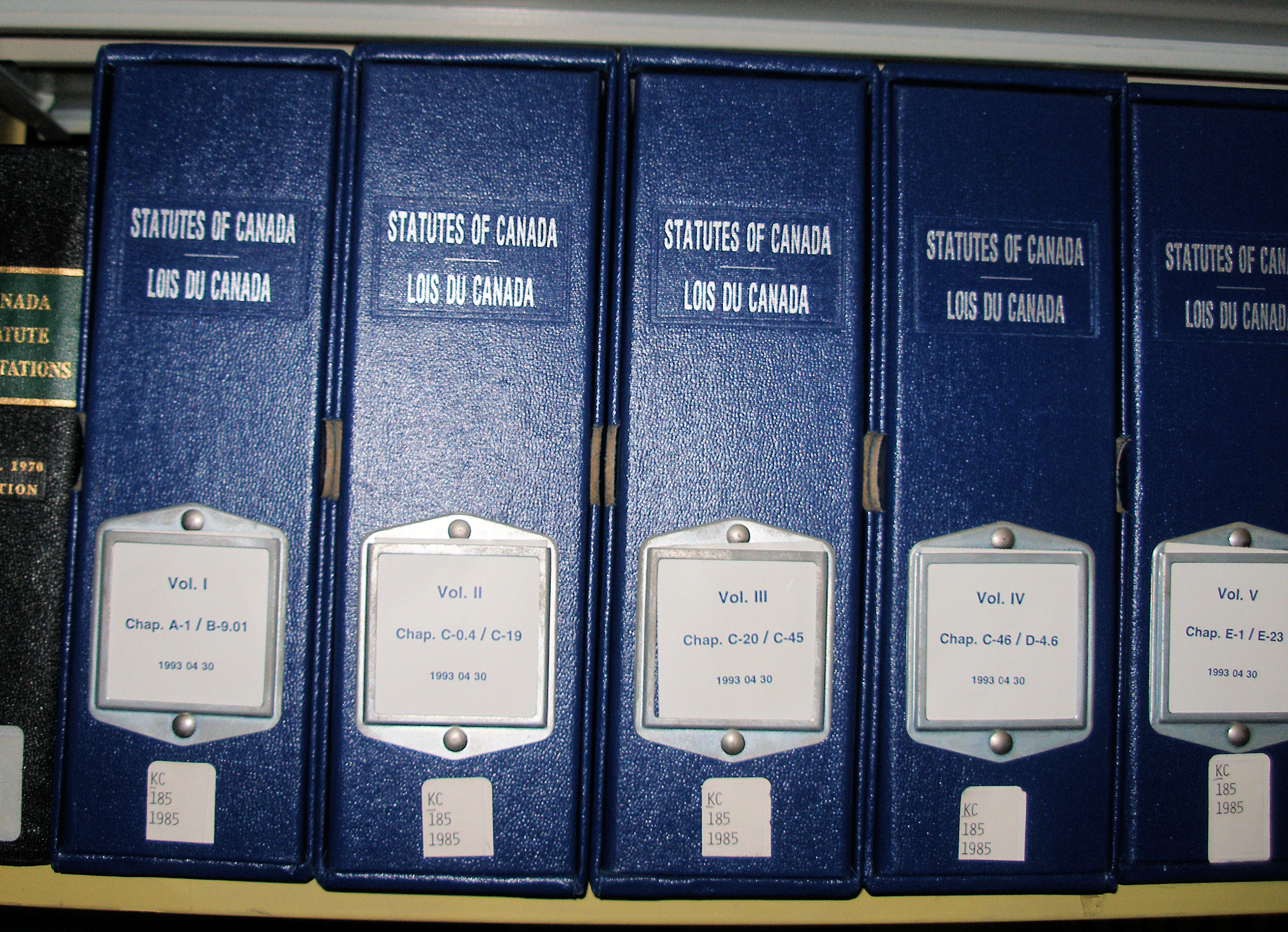
Volumes of the Statutes of Canada at a law library

The Statutes of Canada (SC) compiles, by year, all the laws passed by the Parliament of Canada since Confederation in 1867. They are organized by alphabetical order and are updated and amended by the Government of Canada from time to time. The Revised Statutes of Canada (RSC) consolidates current federal laws in force at the time of publishing, incorporating amendments into acts, adding new substantive acts enacted since the last revision and deleting rescinded acts. The most recent RSC compilation was published in 1985.

== Publication of statutes ==
At the time that the Interpretation Act (1867) was passed, the Statutes of Canada were required to be distributed and published at the end of each session of parliament. This was changed in 1984, with the volumes of the Statutes of Canada being required to be distributed and published at the end of each calendar year. Acts in the Statutes volumes are referred to as "Annual Statutes."

After public acts are passed but before they are compiled in the Statutes, they are published in Part III of the Canada Gazette every three months.

== See also ==
- Canada Gazette
- CanLII
