= Sales tax in Alberta =

Sales tax in Alberta consists only of a federal consumption tax, the Goods and Services Tax (GST).

Alberta is the only province in Canada without a provincial sales tax (PST).

== History ==
Prior to 1936, existing legislation taxed specific goods and services like furs, amusements, coal, electricity, pipelines, and more. On April 1, 1936, Alberta became the first, and only, provincial government in Canada's history to default on a debt payment. This default resulted in Premier William Aberhart's government passing The Ultimate Purchasers Tax Act which introduced the first general sales tax in Alberta. The Act created a 2% tax on sales of all goods, with a few exceptions, effective May 1, 1936. Minor changes were made later in 1936 as The Ultimate Purchasers Tax Act was repealed by The Retail Sales Tax Act, 1936.

In 1937, Aberhart's government passed An Act to amend The Ultimate Purchasers Tax Act which amended The Ultimate Purchasers Tax Act to allow the Lieutenant Governor in Council to suspend the tax indefinitely. Aberhart's government chose to suspend the tax indefinitely effective August 1, 1937 due to public backlash. The suspension of the tax became even more feasible when succession duty from the estate of Patrick Burns resulted in a nearly $1,000,000 tax payment (roughly equivalent to $21,300,000 in 2025), which was approximately equal to the sales tax revenue raised in 1937.

In succeeding years, a growing oil industry in Alberta allowed future governments to avoid sales taxes and even post budget surpluses.

== Federal sales tax ==
On January 1, 1991, Prime Minister Brian Mulroney's government introduced the first general federal sales tax, the Goods and Services Tax (GST), at 7%. The GST replaced the hidden 13.5% manufacturers' sales tax (MST).

On 1 July 2006, Prime Minister Stephen Harper's government reduced the general federal sales tax (GST) to 6%, and on 1 January 2008, Harper's government further reduced the GST to 5%.

== Referendum requirement ==
In 1995, Ralph Klein's government introduced the Alberta Taxpayer Protection Act which legislated any general provincial sales tax be subject to a referendum. The legislation that prevents the introduction of a sales tax without a referendum was expanded in 2023 by UCP Premier Danielle Smith to include increases to personal and corporate tax rates.

== See also ==
- Goods and Services Tax (Canada)
- Harmonized Sales Tax
- Sales taxes in British Columbia
- Sales taxes in Canada
