= Tax Break for All Canadians Act =

Canadian federal legislation

Parliament of Canada
- Long title: An Act respecting temporary cost of living relief (affordability)
- Citation: SC 2024, c. 32
- Passed by: House of Commons of Canada
- Passed: November 28, 2024
- Passed by: Senate of Canada
- Passed: December 12, 2024
- Royal assent: December 12, 2024
- Commenced: December 14, 2024
- Date of expiry: February 15, 2025

Legislative history

First chamber: House of Commons of Canada
- Bill title: Bill C-78, 44th Parliament, 1st Session
- Introduced by: Deputy Prime Minister and Minister of Finance Chrystia Freeland
- Committee responsible: Finance
- First reading: November 27, 2024
- Second reading: November 28, 2024
- Voting summary: 176 voted for; 151 voted against
- Considered by the Finance Committee: November 28, 2024
- Third reading: November 28, 2024

Second chamber: Senate of Canada
- Bill title: Bill C-78
- Member(s) in charge: Representative of the Government in the Senate Marc Gold
- Committee responsible: National Finance
- First reading: December 3, 2024
- Second reading: December 3, 2024
- Considered by the National Finance Committee: December 3, 2024 - December 5, 2024
- Third reading: December 10, 2024 - December 12, 2024
- Voting summary: 58 voted for; 22 voted against; 3 abstained
- Status: Expired

The Tax Break for All Canadians Act (French: Loi concernant un congé fiscal pour l’ensemble des Canadiens) is a statute of the Parliament of Canada. The Liberal government of Prime Minister Justin Trudeau introduced the act in late November 2024 to give a temporary tax holiday on the federal goods and services tax and the federal–provincial harmonized sales tax for food and other commodities over the holiday season. The act came into force on December 14, 2024, and expired on February 15, 2025.

The passage of the act contributed to the resignation of Chrystia Freeland, the deputy prime minister and minister of finance, triggering a political crisis that led to the resignation of Trudeau himself.

== Legislative history ==
Freeland, in her capacity as minister of finance, introduced the bill as a government measure in the House of Commons on November 27, 2024, during the 44th Canadian Parliament. The House of Commons passed the bill on November 28, 2024, and the Senate passed it on December 12, 2024. It received royal assent on the same day.

== Effect of the act ==
Effective December 14, 2024, the act waived the federal goods and services tax and the combined federal–provincial harmonized sales tax (for provinces that adopted HST) on certain qualifying items in the following categories:

- Food and beverages
- Children's clothing and footwear
- Diapers
- Child booster seats
- Christmas trees
- Print books and Newspapers
- Toys
- Games

The tax waiver expired on February 15, 2025.

== Purpose ==
The government stated that the act was passed to alleviate the cost of living crisis in Canada. In Q2 2022, inflation rates in Canada reached a maximum of 8.1%, the highest rate in over 30 years. The Consumer Price Index of Canada increased 4.4% from the end of 2019 to the end of 2023. Nearly half of Canadians in a Statistics Canada survey reported that their ability to cover daily expenses was greatly impaired by the rise in prices of everyday goods.

== Cost ==
The tax holiday was estimated to cost the federal treasury approximately six billion dollars.

== Public reaction ==
The act received mixed reactions from the general public. While most shoppers welcomed the tax break, others noted that it would not truly create that much of an overall impact. Some businesses reported increased logistical burdens over determining the eligibility of and adjusting the tax rate for thousands of items on short notice. As the tax holiday was implemented on a voluntary basis, consumer confusion could arise, with some retailers participating in the program and others not. The tax relief may also temporarily increase inflation, disproportionately benefit wealthier individuals with more disposable income, and ultimately increase economic inequality

== Political fallout ==
On December 16, 2024, the Deputy Prime Minister and Minister of Finance, Chrystia Freeland, resigned from Cabinet in response to Trudeau's financial policies, such as his proposed response to the Trump tariffs and the tax holiday. In her resignation letter, she referred to it as a "costly political gimmick".

Commentators criticized the fact that Trudeau did not consult with the Cabinet before announcing the measure, referring to it as a breakdown in Cabinet government, akin to presidential government.

Freeland's resignation sparked a political crisis, ultimately leading to Trudeau's resignation as prime minister in January 2025, effective March 2025.

== See also ==
- Cost of living adjustment
- Sales taxes in Canada
- Tax exemption
- Taxation in Canada
