= Motor fuel taxes in Canada =

Compulsory levies on car and truck energy sources in the North American country

In Canada, motor vehicles are primarily powered by gasoline or diesel fuel. Other energy sources include ethanol, biodiesel, propane, compressed natural gas (CNG), electric batteries charged from an external source, and hydrogen. Canada, unlike most countries, has excise taxes and other taxes on gasoline, diesel, and other liquid and gas motor fuels (collectively called fuel taxes), and also taxes electricity at various administrative levels. Most provinces and territories in Canada also have taxes on these motor fuels, and some metropolitan areas such as Montreal, Greater Vancouver, and Victoria impose additional taxes.

Additionally, Canada's federal (national) government collects value-added tax (GST) across the country, and some provincial governments also collect a provincial sales tax (PST), which may be combined with the GST into a single harmonized sales tax (HST). HST, GST, or GST + PST where applicable, are calculated on the retail price including the excise taxes.

== Fuel tax rates across Canada ==
=== Gasoline ===
Gasoline Fuel Taxes by Province/Territory (cents per litre) (Effective April 1, 2025)
Government	Federal Excise Tax (CAD¢/L)	Prov/Terr Excise Tax (CAD¢/L)	Fed Carbon tax (CAD¢/L)	Local Fuel Levy (CAD¢/L)	Total Pre-Sales tax (CAD¢/L)	HST, GST, or GST + PST/QST (%)	Minimum tax incl. sales taxes (CAD¢/L)	Min. tax (CAD¢/US gal)
Canada (average)	10	10.33	2.71		23.16	9.68%	25.41	96.2
Newfoundland and Labrador	10	7.50	0		24.50	15%	28.18	106.7
Prince Edward Island	10	8.47	0		18.47	15%	21.24	80.4
Nova Scotia	10	15.50	0		25.50	15%	29.33	111.0
New Brunswick	10	10.87	0		20.87	15%	24.00	90.9
Quebec (Note: Excluding Montreal.)	10	19.20	0		29.20	14.975%	33.57	127.1
Montréal, QC	10	19.20		3	32.20	14.975%	37.02	140.1
Ontario	10	9.0	0		19.00	13%	21.47	81.3
Manitoba	10	12.5	0		10.00	12%	11.20	42.4
Saskatchewan	10	15	0		25.00	5%	26.25	99.4
Alberta	10	13	0		23.00	5%	24.15	91.42
British Columbia (Note: Excluding Greater Vancouver and Greater Victoria)	10	7.75	0	6.75	24.50	5%	25.73	97.40
Vancouver, BC	10	1.75	0	6.75 + 18.5	37.00	5%	38.85	147.06
Victoria, BC	10	7.75	0	6.75 + 5.5	30.00	5%	31.50	119.24
Yukon	10	6.20	0		16.20	5%	17.01	64.4
Northwest Territories	10	10.70	17.61		38.31	5%	40.23	152.3
Nunavut	10	6.40	0		16.40	5%	17.22	65.2

=== Diesel ===
Diesel Fuel Taxes by Province/Territory (Effective April 1, 2024 )
Government	Federal Excise Tax (CAD¢/L)	Prov/Terr Excise Tax (CAD¢/L)	Fed Carbon tax (CAD¢/L)	Prov Carbon tax (CAD¢/L)	Local Fuel Levy (CAD¢/L)	Total Pre-Sales tax (CAD¢/L)	HST, GST, or GST + PST/QST (%)	Minimum tax incl. sales taxes (CAD¢/L)	Min. tax (CAD$/US gal)
Canada (average)	4	11.34	6.12			22.26	9.3%	24.32	0.921
Newfoundland and Labrador	4	16.50	0			20.5	15%	23.58	0.892
Prince Edward Island	4	14.15	0			18.15	14%	20.69	0.783
Nova Scotia	4	15.40	0			19.4	15%	22.31	0.845
New Brunswick	4	15.45	0			19.45	15%	22.37	0.847
Quebec	4	20.20				24.2	14.98%	27.82	1.053
Ontario	4	14.30	0			18.3	13%	20.68	0.783
Manitoba	4	14	0			18	12%	20.16	0.763
Saskatchewan	4	15	0			19	5%	19.95	0.755
Alberta	4	13	0			17	5%	17.85	0.676
British Columbia	4	8.25	0	0	6.75	19	5%	19.95	0.755
Vancouver, BC	4	2.25	0	0	6.75 + 18.5	31.5	5%	33.08	1.252
Victoria, BC	4	8.25	0	0	6.75 + 5.5	21.45	5%	22.52	0.853
Yukon	4	7.20	0			11.2	5%	11.76	0.445
Northwest Territories	4	9.10		13.7		26.8	5%	28.14	1.065
Nunavut	4	9.10	21.39			34.49	5%	36.21	1.371

== Tax collection and rate changes ==
In March 2022, the Alberta government announced it would suspend the collection of the fuel tax starting April 1, as a way to fight the rising cost of fuel.

In December 2023, the Alberta government announced that with lower oil prices, the fuel tax would be phased back in after Dec. 31, 2023.

On March 15, 2025 the Government of Canada enabled regulations that set the federal carbon tax to 0. The effective date for the change was April 1, 2025. The affected provinces and territories were Alberta, Manitoba, New Brunswick, Newfoundland and Labrador, Nova Scotia, Nunavut, Ontario, Prince Edward Island, Saskatchewan, and Yukon. After this announcement, Premier of British Columbia David Eby announced the elimination of the BC carbon tax on April 1, 2025.

== Tax revenues ==
The Government of Canada collects about $5 billion per year in excise taxes on gasoline, diesel, and aviation fuel as well as approximately $1.6 billion per year from GST revenues on gasoline and diesel (net of input tax credits). The Canada Revenue Agency, a part of the government, collects these taxes.

Collectively, the provincial governments collect approximately $8 billion per year from excise taxes on gasoline and diesel.

The federal taxes go into general coffers and help to fund a range of programs: $2 billion of the approximately $5 billion collected from federal excise taxes goes into the now permanent annual Gas Tax Fund for municipal infrastructure. Provincial tax revenues usually go to fund road repair and construction, and additionally in some provinces a portion of revenues (for example, 2 cents/litre in Ontario) is also distributed directly to municipalities.

== Criticism ==
In Quebec, an Ipsos poll released in 2022 found that 73% of the population thought that the taxes levied on fuel were too high.

== See also ==
- Fuel Tax
- Fuel taxes in Australia
- Fuel taxes in the United States
