= Fuel tax =

Compulsory levy on energy released from a source

A fuel tax, also known as a gas tax or a fuel duty, is an excise tax imposed on the sale of fuel. In most countries, the fuel tax is imposed on fuels which are intended for transportation. Fuel tax receipts are often dedicated or hypothecated to transportation projects, in which case the fuel tax can be considered a user fee. In other countries, the fuel tax is a source of general revenue. Sometimes, a fuel tax is used as an ecotax, to promote ecological sustainability. Fuel taxes are often considered by government agencies such as the Internal Revenue Service as regressive taxes.

Fuels used to power agricultural vehicles, as well as home heating oil which is similar to diesel, are taxed at a different, usually lower rate. These fuels may be dyed to prevent their use for transportation. Aviation fuel is typically charged at a different rate to fuel for ground-based vehicles. Jet fuel and avgas can attract different rates. In many jurisdictions such as the United States and the European Union, commercial aviation fuel is tax free. Other fuels such as gases, or solid fuels such as coal, may also be taxed. In countries with a sales tax or a value added tax, these taxes may also be levied on top of fuel taxes. The rate can vary depending on the fuel, as well as the location.

== Role in energy policy ==
Taxes on transportation fuels have been advocated as a way to reduce pollution, the possibility of global warming and conserve energy. Placing higher taxes on fossil fuels makes petrol just as expensive as other fuels such as natural gas, biodiesel or electric batteries, at a cost to the consumer in the form of inflation as transportation costs rise to transport goods all over the country. Proponents advocate that automobiles should pay for the roads they use and argue that the user tax should not be applied to mass transit projects. The Intergovernmental Panel on Climate Change, the International Energy Agency, the International Monetary Fund, and the World Bank have called on governments to increase gasoline tax rates in order to combat the social and environmental costs of gasoline consumption. Fuel taxes can be implicit carbon pricing.

== Tax rates ==
International pump prices for diesel and gasoline are tracked by several websites, including Bloomberg News. Price differences mostly reflect differences in tax policy. A Nature study has shown that while gasoline taxes have increased in more countries than they have decreased in during the period 2003–2015, the global mean gasoline tax has decreased due to greater consumption in the low-tax countries.

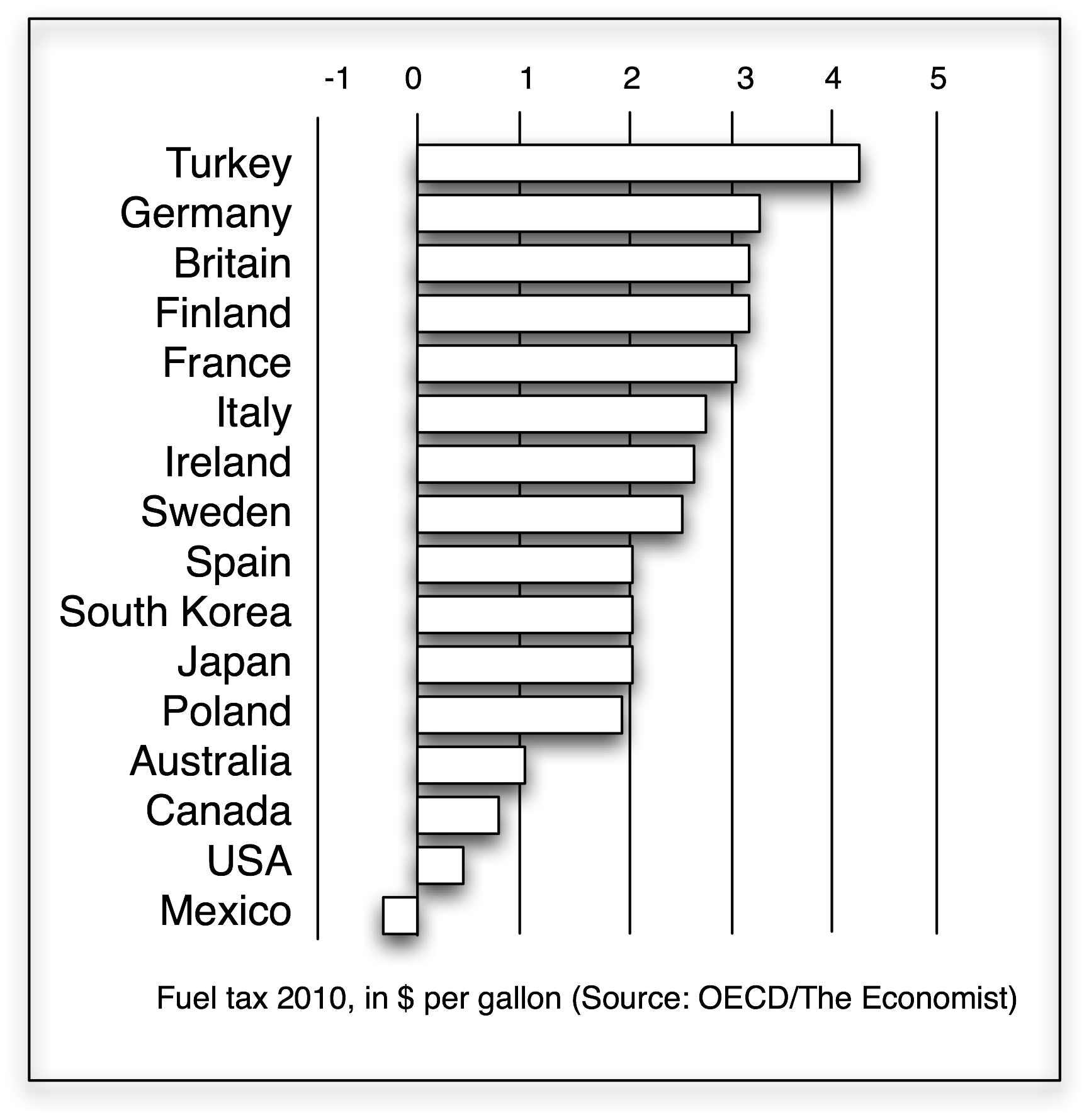
Fuel tax in OECD countries 2010

=== Asia ===
==== China ====
Chinese gasoline taxes have increased the most among the top twenty CO_{2}-emitting countries over the period 2003–2015. In China, fuel tax has been a very contentious issue. Efforts by the State Council to institute a fuel tax in order to finance the National Trunk Highway System have run into strong opposition from the National People's Congress, largely out of concern for its impact on farmers. This has been one of the uncommon instances in which the legislature has asserted its authority.

==== Hong Kong ====
The following is a list of fuel tax rates for different fuels in Hong Kong:

- Aviation fuel: HK$6.51
- Light diesel oil: HK$2.89
- Leaded petrol: HK$6.82
- Unleaded petrol: HK$6.06
- Ultra low sulphur diesel: HK$2.89
- Euro V diesel: HK$0

==== Singapore ====
The following is a list of fuel tax rates for different fuels in Singapore:

- 98 Octane and above petrol: S$0.79 per litre
- 92 to 95 Octane petrol: S$0.66 per litre

==== India ====
In India, the pricing of fuel varies by state, though central taxes still are part of the pump price of fuel. The Central and state government's taxes make up nearly half of petrol's pump price. The Central govt has different taxes, which amount to about 10–20% of the final cost. The states taxes vary, but on average end up making about 17–20% of the final cost. As a result, approximately 50% - 60% of the pump cost goes to the government in the form of different taxes. For example, in Delhi, as of February 18, 2021, the price of petrol is ₹89.54 (95¢ US) per litre. Out of this ₹32.98 (35¢ US) goes to the Central Govt of India in the form of excise and customs tax. ₹19.32 (20¢ US) is collected by the state government in the form of sales tax and entry tax. Thus, a total of ₹52.30 (55¢ US) is collected due to various taxes (which accounts for around 58% of the total price).

==== Israel ====
In Israel, tax on fuel is 1.35 USD per liter which includes direct fuel tax and VAT. This totals to 78% of the total pump price.

=== Europe ===
Jet fuel tax is banned on commercial flights within the European Union, according to the 2003 Energy Taxation Directive. It can be levied on domestic flights or by agreement between Member States, however no such agreements exist.

==== France ====
As of 2017, the excise tax on gasoline was €0.651 per liter (regional prices varied from €0.407 to €0.6682). With a VAT rate of 20%, the percent of the total price of gasoline that came from taxes was 63.9% The excise tax on diesel fuel was €0.531 per liter (€0.5307 to €0.5631). With the 20% VAT, 59.3% of the total cost of diesel fuel was taxes. Petroleum products destined for utilisation by aircraft engaged in commercial flights outside of the customs territory of continental France are exempt from all customs duties and domestic taxes. Recently, a rise of 23% in the diesel fuel tax has caused serious protests in major cities of France, leaving disruption and damage behind them. Before the protests, the French government expected to increase both the petrol and diesel taxes until they both reached €0.78 per liter in 2022.

==== Germany ====
Fuel taxes in Germany are €0.4704 per litre for ultra-low sulphur Diesel and €0.6545 per litre for conventional unleaded petrol, plus Value Added Tax (19%) on the fuel itself and the Fuel Tax. That adds up to prices of €1.12 per litre (€4.24/US gal; €5.09/imp gal) for ultra-low sulphur Diesel and €1.27 per litre (€4.81/US gal; €5.77/imp gal) for unleaded petrol (December 2019).

==== Luxembourg ====
Since January 2023, petrol is taxed at a rate of €0.53799/litre and diesel at a rate of €0.42875/litre, with a VAT of 17% added to the total price. As of 2022, a "maximum fuel price" has been established by the government, capped at €1.473/litre for EURO 95 petrol and at €1.436/litre for diesel since 20 March 2025.

==== Netherlands ====
The sale of fuels in the Netherlands is levied with an excise tax. As of 2015, petrol excise tax is EUR0.766 per litre and diesel excise tax is EUR0.482 per litre, while LPG excise tax is EUR0.185 per litre. The 2007 fuel tax was €0.684 per litre (€2.59/US gal; €3.11/imp gal). On top of that is 21% VAT over the entire fuel price, making the Dutch taxes one of the highest in the world. In total, taxes account for 68.84% of the total price of petrol and 56.55% of the total price of diesel. A 1995 excise was raised by Dutch gulden 25 cents (€0.11), the Kok Quarter (€0.08 raise per litre gasoline and €0.03 raise per litre diesel), by then Prime-Minister Wim Kok is now specifically set aside by the second Balkenende cabinet for use in road creation and road and public transport maintenance.

==== Norway ====
Motor fuel is taxed with both a road use tax and a CO_{2}-tax. The road use tax on petrol is NOK 4.62 per litre and the CO_{2}-tax on petrol is NOK 0.88 per litre. The road use tax on auto diesel is NOK 3.62 per litre mineral oil and NOK 1.81 per litre bio diesel. The CO_{2}-tax on mineral oil is NOK 0.59 per litre.

==== Poland ====
In Poland half of the end-user price charged at a petrol station goes towards 3 distinct taxes:

- akcyza (meaning excise)
- opłata paliwowa (meaning fuel tax)
- Value-added tax "VAT" at 23% (from summary of akcyza and opłata paliwowa, and the price of petrol)

Excise and fuel tax are prescribed by European Commission law, and therefore cannot be lower in any EU nation. However it is even higher than this EU minimum in Poland, a policy pursued by the former Minister of finance.

==== Sweden ====
The fuel tax in Sweden comprises a carbon tax and an energy tax. The total tax (including value added tax) is, from July 1, 2018, 8.425 kr per liter petrol and 7.425 kr per liter diesel.

==== United Kingdom ====
From 23 March 2022, the UK duty rate for the road fuels unleaded petrol, diesel, biodiesel and bioethanol is £0.5295 per litre (£2.41/imp gal; £2.00/US gal). Value Added Tax at 20% is also charged on the price of the fuel and on the duty. An additional vehicle excise duty, depending on a vehicle's theoretical CO_{2} production per kilometre, which is applied regardless of the amount of fuel actually consumed, is also levied. Diesel for use by farmers and construction vehicles is coloured red (red diesel) and has a much reduced tax, currently £0.1133 per litre (£0.515/imp gal; £0.429/US gal). Jet fuel used for international aviation attracts no duty, and no VAT.

=== North America ===
==== Canada ====
Fuel taxes in Canada can vary greatly between locales. On average, about one-third of the total price of gas at the pump is tax. Excise taxes on gasoline and diesel are collected both federal and provincial governments, as well as by some select municipalities (Montreal, Vancouver, and Victoria); with combined excise taxes varying from 16.2 ¢/L (73.6 ¢/imperial gal)) in the Yukon to 30.5 ¢/L ($1.386/imperial gal) in Vancouver. As well, the federal government and some provincial governments (Newfoundland and Labrador, Nova Scotia, and Quebec) collect sales tax (GST and PST) on top of the retail price and the excise taxes.

==== United States ====
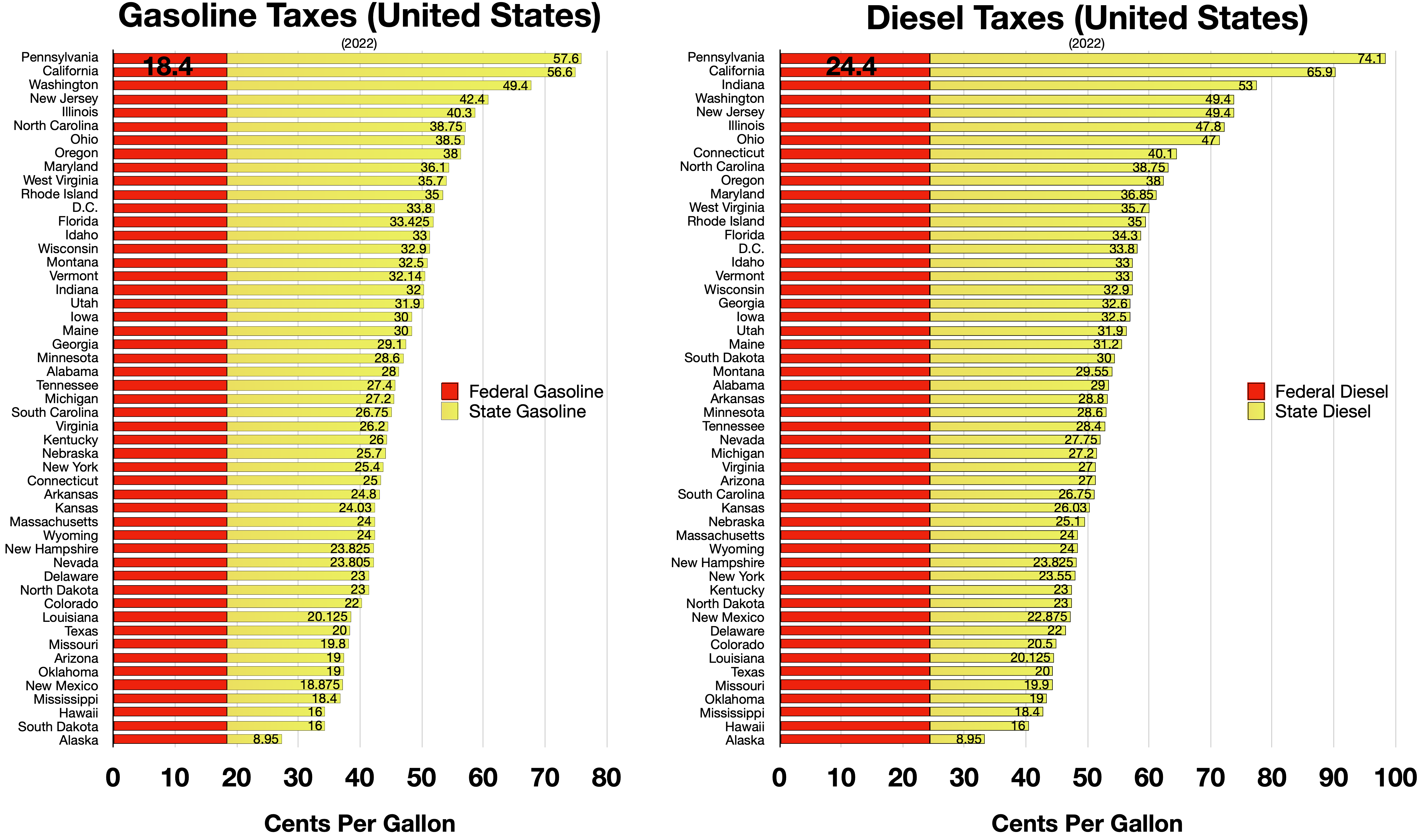
Fuel Taxes (2022) Federal Taxes State Taxes

The first U.S. state to enact a gas tax was Oregon in 1919. The states of Colorado, North Dakota, and New Mexico followed shortly thereafter. By 1929, all existing 48 states had enacted some sort of gas tax. Today, fuel taxes in the United States vary by state. The United States federal excise tax on gasoline is 18.4 cents per US gallon (4.9 ¢/L) and 24.4 cents per US gallon (6.4 ¢/L) for diesel fuel. On average, as of July 2016, state and local taxes add 29.78 cents to gasoline and 29.81 cents to diesel for a total US average fuel tax of 48.18 cents per US gallon (12.73 ¢/L) for gas and 54.21 cents per US gallon (14.32 ¢/L) for diesel.

The state and local tax figures includes fixed-per-gallon taxes as well as variable-rate taxes such as those levied as a percentage of the sales price. For state-level fuel taxes, nineteen states and the District of Columbia levy variable-rate taxes of some kind. The other thirty one states do not tie the per-gallon tax rate to inflation, gas prices, or other factors, and the rate changes only by legislation. As of July 2016, twenty one states had gone ten years or more without an increase in their per-gallon gasoline tax rate.

Because the fuel tax is universally styled as a "road use" tax, exempting off-road farming, marine, etc. use; states impose a tax on commercial operators traveling through their state as if the fuel used was bought there, wherever the fuel is purchased. While most commercial truck drivers have an agent to handle the required paperwork: what's reported is how much tax was collected in each state, how much should have been paid to each state, the net tax for each state and the combined net tax for all states to be paid by or refunded to the operator by their base jurisdiction where they file. The operator carries paperwork proving compliance. The member jurisdictions, the US states and the CA provinces, transmit the return information to each other and settle their net tax balances with each other either by a single transmittal through a clearinghouse set up by the IFTA and operated by Morgan Stanley, or by separate transfers with the other member jurisdictions.

=== Oceania ===
==== Australia ====
In February 2026, the fuel tax in Australia was $0.526 per litre for petrol and diesel, with the excise for LPG being $0.172 per litre. These rates were reduced to 0.206 per litre for petrol and diesel, and LPG was reduced to $0.067 per litre, between the beginning of April and the end of June, as part of a number of measures introduced to lower the cost of living. A GST (goods and services tax) is then charged on top, and prices are adjusted twice annually based on inflation (consumer price index).

==== New Zealand ====
Fuel taxes in New Zealand are considered an excise applied by the New Zealand Customs Service on shipments brought into the country. A breakdown of the fuel taxes is published by the Ministry of Economic Development. Excise as of 1 August 2012 totals 50.524 cents per litre (NZ $2.30/imp gal; $1.91/US gal on petrol. In addition, the national compulsory Accident Compensation Corporation motor vehicle account receives a contribution of 9.9 cents per litre (45 ¢/imp gal; 37 ¢/US gal). The ethanol component of bio blended petrol currently attracts no excise duty. This was to be reviewed in 2012. Diesel is not taxed at the pump, but road users with vehicles over 3.5 tonne in Gross Laden Weight and any vehicles not powered wholly by any combination of petrol, LPG or CNG must pay the Road User Charge instead. The Goods and Services Tax (15%) is then applied to the combined total of the value of the commodity and the various taxes. On 25 July 2007 the Minister of Transport Annette King announced that from 1 July 2008 all fuel excise collected would be hypothecated to the National Land Transport Programme.

=== Africa ===
==== South Africa ====
South Africa imposes a fuel tax, in Dec 2020, per (unleaded 93 octane, inland) litre, composed of the Fuel Levy – R3,37, Road Accident Fund levy – R1,93, associated costs – R3,12, and the Basic Fuel Price – R5,81 for a total of R14.23. (R = South African Rand (ZAR) ~ R15 per US$ in Dec 2020)

== See also ==
- Carbon fee and dividend
- Carbon tax
- International Fuel Tax Agreement
- Vehicle miles traveled tax
- World oil market chronology from 2003 – how the taxes of various countries could be used to mitigate the rise in oil prices since 2003
