= Sales taxes in British Columbia =

Taxes levied in the Canadian province of British Columbia

Sales taxes in British Columbia come in the form of the Goods and Services Tax (GST) and Provincial Sales Tax (PST).

Consumption taxes have been levied in British Columbia since the introduction of the Provincial Sales Tax (PST) on 1 July 1948, as part of the Social Service Tax Act. Sales in the province have also been subject to the federal Goods and Services Tax (GST) since its introduction on 1 January 1991.

On 1 July 2010, the PST and GST were combined into the HST levied according to the provisions of the GST. The conversion to HST was controversial; popular opposition led to a referendum on the tax system, the first such referendum in the Commonwealth of Nations, resulting in the province reverting to the former PST/GST model on 1 April 2013.

The sales taxes levied in the province are the separate 7% PST and 5% GST, as of April 2013.

== Provincial Sales Tax ==
The former British Columbia Provincial Sales Tax (BC PST) was introduced on 1 July 1948 as part of the Social Service Tax Act. It was initially set at 3%, but later rose to 7%. The PST was collected on most goods and some services. The main difference between the national Goods and Services Tax (GST) and the BC PST was its taxable base, since the GST taxation was levied regardless of whether the good or service was for "final use" or not.

Tax exemptions included: unprocessed food, restaurants, motor fuel, children's clothes and footwear, goods purchased for resale or export, goods used in the manufacturing or production of an end use product, legal services, massage therapy, vitamins, repair services, and taxis.

=== Non-taxable Sales and Services ===
When a good or service is not subject to PST, a specific exemption in the legislation is not needed. Similar to the old PST, the following are not taxable under the new PST: the sales of real property such as residential housing or commercial real estate; admissions, registrations, and memberships; professional services (other than legal services); and transportation fares (e.g. bus, train, ferry, airline).

=== Tax revenue ===
The PST revenue was estimated at $5.087 billion for the 2009/2010 fiscal year, from which about $2 billion was paid directly by the business sector. PST revenue accounted for about 13% of the province's total revenues which were budgeted at $38.812 billion.

== Harmonized Sales Tax ==
The Harmonized Sales Tax (HST) was a value-added tax that combined a 5% federal portion and a 7% provincial portion into one tax paid on almost all purchases of goods and services. The HST came into effect amidst contention among British Columbians on 1 July 2010. The BC Liberal government announced on 23 July 2009 that it intended to replace the PST by an HST, combining the GST with a provincial tax following the same rules as the GST. Had the HST passed the referendum, the BC Liberals contended that they would have reduced it to 10% in 2014.

=== Rationale for implementing the HST ===
The governing Liberals contended that, although PST was a retail tax, the business sector was also subject to a 7% PST on most of its input; business in BC was put at a competitive disadvantage with business in other jurisdictions not subject to similar taxation.

The Liberals argued that transferring this tax to the consumer favoured both exportation and investment in productivity. A federal Conservative government study considered this a more efficient method of taxation; labour-intensive service industries (like hairdresser or hospitality services), where inputs are marginal, would be disfavoured.

=== Changes from the PST ===
The HST added an additional 7% of sales tax to the following items:

- Children's disposable diapers – actually went up from 5% HST to 12% GST+PST
- Newspapers
- Certain school supplies
- Magazines
- Private sale of automobiles:
  - There was no GST on private sales. When HST was introduced, the provincial government introduced a provincial used vehicle levy of 12%, which remains after reverting to PST. As of March 2015, private vehicle sales continue to be taxed by the BC government at 12%.
- EnergyStar windows
- Thermal insulation, weather stripping, and caulking
- First aid kits
- Smoke detectors valued less than $250
- Food producing plants and trees
- Household moving services
- Adult sized clothing for children
- Shoe repair
- Tailoring services
- Dry cleaning
- Used adult clothing purchased for less than $100
- Snack foods
- Restaurant meals
- Catering and event planning services
- Basic cable television
- Local residential phone
- Repair to certain household appliances
- Repair, maintenance or renovation services for real property
- Landscaping, lawn-care, private snow removal, and house cleaning
- Computer software repair services
- Taxis
- Camping sites
- Domestic air, rail and bus travel originating in British Columbia and with destinations with BC.
- Motor vehicle parking
- Real estate commissions
- Massage therapy services
- Over-the-counter medications
- Vitamins
- Admission to professional sporting events
- Movie tickets
- Safety helmets for sports
- Golf memberships and driving range fees
- Gym and athletic memberships
- Ballet, karate, trampoline, hockey, soccer lessons, etc.
- Tickets for live theatre
- Bicycles
- Admission to museums and art galleries
- Music concerts
- Ski lift passes
- Children's sized ski boots
- Hockey rink and rental halls
- Music or video purchased and downloaded electronically.
- Funeral services
- Fitness trainers
- Hair stylists/barbers
- Esthetician services
- Accounting services
- Interior design services
- Wedding planning services
- Veterinarian services
- Cigarettes
- Cigars
- Chewing tobacco
- Nicotine replacement products
- Postage
- Personal protective equipment such as helmets, harnesses, safety footwear, eye protection, etc.

The HST lowered the sales tax on the following items:

- Alcoholic beverages – dropped to 10% total sales tax, but liquor prices were increased to remain at the same total price
- Residential electricity and heating – dropped to 5% after a 7% provincial rebate
- Hotel rooms – dropped to 12% from 13%
- Short-term auto rentals – $1.50 per day tax removed
- New homes under $525,000 – eligible for a rebate of $26,250

=== PST/HST revenue adjustment ===
==== PST versus HST revenue ====
Some people believed that the HST would generate significantly more revenue, because while the PST revenue was estimated at $5.083 billion for 2009/2010, several sources concurred and estimated a 5% GST revenue for British Columbia of about $5 billion (or a tax base at about $100 billion after the current GST exemption concerning the public sector). It suggested that since most sales subject to GST would be HST taxable (at 7% for the BC HST revenue), this revenue could be multiplied by 7%/5% to estimate the gross BC HST revenue. If the taxable base were roughly the same, this would result in approximately $7 billion in BC HST revenue.

It did not take into account the additional transition payment of $1.6 billion provided by the federal government as a consequence of the HST adoption, and collection cost saving estimated at $30 million.

According to BC government's projection, gross BC HST revenue for 2011/12 would have been $6.92 billion. After various rebates, the net BC HST revenue would have been $5.38 billion, which is $410 million more than the would-be BC PST revenue ($4.97 billion) if there were no reform. The BC government argued that the $410 million difference, however, would be returned to residents through HST-related personal income tax reductions in the forms of BC HST credit and increased basic personal amount. The overall fiscal impact of harmonization on BC households was therefore supposedly neutral.

==== Possible mitigation measures ====
In order to be revenue-neutral, the BC government had several options. The Memorandum agreed between the provincial and the federal government gave the former the flexibility to

- adjust the tax rate (after a two-year period, and now fixed at 7%). According to the above projection the tax base change could provide room for a decrease of the tax rate of more than 1 point, to keep revenue neutral.
- exempt some goods and/or services so long as the total amount exempted is less than 5% of the total tax base to which the HST would otherwise apply.

The Memorandum seemed to prefer the second path by suggesting exemption of motive fuel, children's clothing and footwear, children's car seats, feminine hygiene and books.

Following the rationale justifying the introduction of the HST, the BC government followed the example of the Ontario government, and chose to reduce other taxes including some claimed by the Fraser Institute to be inefficient in economic terms such as personal income taxes.

=== Criticism ===
Rather than decrease the rate of the HST across the board, the provincial government chose to favour some special interest group industries, which received some criticism; some noted that the discretionary exemptions defeated one purpose of the HST: tax harmonization, with cost-saving achieved by red-tape reduction.

The HST shift appeared to benefit mostly the capital-intensive multinational industries such as mining and forestry in BC. The government chose to exclude most of the labour-intensive service industry from HST tax relief, and appeared to favour the rural BC interior over the urban area ridings. The exemption on automotive fuel was one consequence of this choice; the tax shift would favour declining legacy industry, representing a declining share of the BC GDP.

However, the government adopted the following policy on goods taxation:

- tax credit on goods that have a demand elasticity independent of family income (e.g. heating fuel)
- provincial HST exemption on goods that have a demand elasticity that is a function of family income, (e.g. children's clothing)

==== Motor fuels and the carbon tax ====
In 2008, BC introduced a carbon tax as part of its effort to reduce greenhouse gas emissions, which is applied to motor fuels as well as other fuels . Implementation of the carbon tax was controversial as the 2010 BC Budget granted petroleum fuels a 5% reduction from the carbon tax while imposing the full carbon tax on renewable fuels. While motor fuels are also subject to HST, the province decided that once the HST was implemented it would rebate the 7% provincial portion of the HST on motor fuels at the time of purchase.

The BC government chose not to reduce the carbon tax and/or other taxes on motor fuels such as transportation infrastructure and transit taxes and then add the HST. This decision meant that businesses which purchase motor fuel to operate their businesses were unable to deduct any of the provincial taxes they pay on motor fuels from the HST they collect on their sales. This outcome is particularly harsh on businesses that had not been required to collect the PST but must use motor fuels to operate their businesses, such as sightseeing and adventure tour businesses.

==== Tax shift from business to consumers ====
In BC, the HST was reported to be a tax shift onto consumers and away from business. The BC government estimated businesses would pay $1.9 billion less in sales taxes. claiming that this would boost investment from corporations as their MTR is reduced. The claim is made that this would benefit consumers through more jobs and lower prices.

A report done for the BC Ministry of Finance by University of Calgary economics professor Jack Mintz predicted that moving to the HST would create 11,300 jobs per year, increasing employment income by around $333 million, and result in capital investment of $1.15 billion/year.

==== Sports and recreation ====
In 2009/2010, the government spent $70 million in the promotion of healthy living and sports. Introducing the HST added a new taxation of 7% for numerous health-friendly activities, such as purchasing bicycles, fitness and gym club memberships, and ski passes.

==== Social issues ====
The HST increased the price of heating fuel, which was previously exempted by the PST. The government claimed it planned to provide a tax credit to mitigate this effect.

==== Housing ====
Renting a home was exempt under HST.

The purchase of an existing home was exempt from the HST, while the purchase of a new home was subject to a GST rebate of 36% if the purchase price was below $350,000, up to a maximum rebate of $8,750 (which made the tax rate effectively 3.2%). Under the PST, the purchase of a new home was tax exempt. Under the BC HST, up to $200,000 of the provincial part of the HST could be refunded (making the purchase of new home under $400,000 virtually tax free).

Nevertheless, the service of real estate agents and home appraisals became subject to full HST, whereas before they were only subject to GST. The BC Liberal government argued the change would have little effect on the market:

- Realtor fees were traditionally paid by the seller, and tax increase would only affect its potential benefit (that is assuming the cost of the home is fixed by the market).
- Cost of appraisal service can be considered negligible in a traditional home purchase.

The government argued that HST effect on new home pricing would be mitigated by suppression of the PST on the construction inputs.

=== Referendum ===
On 26 August 2011 Elections BC, the independent electoral overseer, announced that British Columbia voters defeated the new tax in the binding referendum conducted in June and July 2011 via a mail-in ballot. It was the first binding referendum on taxation in any state/provincial or national jurisdiction in the Commonwealth of Nations. The referendum results were as follows:

- Yes: 54.73% (to repeal the HST)
- No: 45.27%

Elections BC compiled the vote totals by electoral district; the HST was voted down in 60 of British Columbia's 85 districts. The HST was rejected by local majorities in 27 of the 49 districts held by the governing Liberals, and in 33 of the 36 seats held by the opposition NDP. The HST was approved by local majorities in 22 of the Liberal-held districts, and in three NDP-held districts.

There was considerable local variation in the vote results. The anti-HST vote was highest in Surrey-Green Timbers, where 75.51% voted Yes and 24.49% voted No. The anti-HST vote was lowest in West Vancouver-Sea to Sky, where 39.22% voted Yes and 60.78% voted No.

As of April 2013, the 5% federal GST and 7% provincial PST are collected separately again.

== See also ==
- Sales taxes in Canada
