= Implicit carbon prices =

Indirect costs of climate change measures

Implicit carbon prices arise from measures which impact on the marginal cost of emitting greenhouse gas (GHG) emissions without targeting GHG emissions or the carbon content of fuel directly. As such, they contribute to climate change mitigation. Examples of these instruments include fuel taxes applied to reduce local pollution and the removal of subsidies for fossil fuel consumption.

In contrast to implicit carbon prices, explicit carbon prices are measures designed specifically to target GHG emissions or the carbon content of fuel. Measures such as carbon taxes or emissions trading schemes put an explicit price on GHG emissions.

The sum of implicit and explicit carbon prices is referred to as the effective carbon price. Considering both the implicit and explicit carbon prices can contribute to a better understanding of a country's progress on tackling emissions. It can also lead to better policy alignment and reduce inconsistencies in the fiscal system—such as when subsidies for fossil fuel consumption are combined with carbon taxes.

== Examples of Policies ==
Depending on the instrument, implicit carbon prices can be either positive or negative. Fuel taxes, which increase the costs of fossil fuels, can be considered as positive carbon pricing measures as they make it more expensive to emit GHGs. On the other hand, subsidies for fossil fuel consumption incentivize the use of fossil fuels by decreasing their cost, and therefore result in a negative carbon price. The removal of these subsidies through reform are a positive implicit carbon price.

Opinions differ on what policies can be considered implicit carbon prices. Many agree that energy taxes and (the withdrawal of) fossil fuel subsidies can be seen as pricing carbon implicitly because they alter the price of fossil fuels. Other policies could also be seen as implicitly pricing carbon, such as tradable performance standards or traffic congestion taxes that are not applicable to cleaner vehicles. Other instruments could be included as well as long as they affect the price of emitting GHGs. Implicit carbon prices are more common than explicit ones at a global level. While almost all countries will have a gasoline tax, only 39 have explicit carbon pricing policies. There are a number of reasons for implicit carbon pricing being more widespread. Policies that implicitly price carbon often target problems at the local level (e.g., air pollution, traffic congestion, or the need for fiscal revenues). In addition, they often do not require as much technical or administrative capacity as explicit carbon pricing policies, which must measure and monitor GHG emissions levels. Implicit carbon prices can also face less political opposition as they can be less polarising than measures which explicitly reference the climate or carbon.

== Relevance for designing border carbon adjustment mechanisms ==
Considering both implicit and explicit carbon pricing measures can result in a very different understanding of a country’s actions on GHG emissions reductions than if only explicit carbon pricing is examined. Some countries may have a carbon tax or emissions allowance trading scheme in place, while others may have implemented other policies that, overall, put a much higher price on domestic GHG emissions.

Whether to take explicit or effective carbon prices into account has policy implications for the design of border carbon adjustment (BCA) mechanisms. BCA mechanisms attempt to prevent carbon leakage by putting a price on the GHG emissions embedded in goods imported from countries whose GHG policies are not at a comparably stringent level as those of the importing country. The European Union’s proposal for a Carbon Border Adjustment Mechanism defines ‘carbon price’ as a “tax or emission allowances under a greenhouse gas emissions trading system” and so is looking at the explicit carbon tax applied. In contrast, a proposed BCA in the United States includes a wider range of policies that includes implicit carbon pricing. It has been argued that using effective carbon pricing instead of explicit carbon pricing for BCA mechanisms could result in greater reductions in GHG emissions while also being more politically feasible and compatible with international trade agreements.
