= Canada Groceries and Essentials Benefit =

Fiscal measure of the Government of Canada

Bill C-19: Canada Groceries and Essentials Benefit Act

Parliament of Canada
- Long title: An Act to amend the Income Tax Act
- Enacted by: House of Commons
- Enacted by: Senate
- Royal assent: February 12, 2026

Legislative history

Initiating chamber: House of Commons
- Bill title: Bill C-19, 45th Parliament, 1st session
- Introduced by: François-Philippe Champagne, Minister of Finance and National Revenue
- First reading: January 28, 2026
- Second reading: February 2, 2026
- Third reading: February 4, 2026

Revising chamber: Senate
- First reading: February 5, 2026
- Second reading: February 10, 2026
- Third reading: February 12, 2026
- Status: Current legislation

The Canada Groceries and Essentials Benefit (CGEB; French: Allocation canadienne pour l’épicerie et les besoins essentiels) is a fiscal measure administered by the Canada Revenue Agency on behalf of the Government of Canada.

Announced by Prime Minister Mark Carney on January 26, 2026, the benefit replaces the Goods and Services Tax Credit (GSTC) (Note: Also known as the GST/HST credit as it also refunds part of the Harmonized Sales Tax (HST) paid in provinces where it is enacted.) and provides enhanced refunds to lower-income households starting in 2026.

The CGEB is a tax-free quarterly payment provided to individuals and families to refund a portion of the Goods and Services Tax (GST) they pay on their purchases throughout the year. Administered by the Canada Revenue Agency, eligibility to the program is automatically determined upon filling of income taxes.

On January 28, 2026, the minister of finance and national revenue François-Philippe Champagne introduced bill C-19 (Note: An Act to amend the Income Tax Act whose short title is Canada Groceries and Essentials Benefit Act.) in the House of Commons to implement the CGEB through amendments to the Income Tax Act. Bill C-19 was passed by the House of Commons on February 4, 2026 and by the Senate on February 12, 2026. It received royal assent later that day.

== History ==
=== Federal Sales Tax Credit (1986-1990) ===
The refundable federal sales tax credit was introduced by the 1986 federal budget (along with an increase in the rates of the federal sales tax). At the time the yearly credit was $50 per adult and $25 per child. (Note: The tax credit amount is reduced by 15% of the family income in excess of $15,000.) Cost of the new benefit was estimated at $330 millions for fiscal year 1986-87.

Amendments in the Income Tax Act were passed later in 1986 and created section 122.4 which provided the refundable credit. The 1987 federal budget tightened the rules for the calculation of the family income (for instance in the case of unmarried parents).

Amounts for the yearly credit have been increased several times:

Yearly Credit	1986	1987	1988	1989	1990
Adult	$50		$70	$100	$140
Child	$25		$35	$50	$70

The income threshold where the credit is reduced was also raised from $15,000 in 1986 to $16,000 in 1988 and $18,000 in 1990.

=== Goods and Services Tax Credit (since 1991) ===
As part of the comprehensive tax reform leading up to the introduction of the Goods and Services Tax on January 1, 1991 the federal government announced the replacement of the previous federal sales tax credit with a new and enriched Goods and Services Tax Credit (GSTC). Credit amount would be significantly raised to reach $275 per adult and $100 per child. The income threshold for credit reduction was also significantly raised from $18,000 to $24,800. The government projected in 1989 that 9.3 million families would be eligible for the GSTC in 1991.

On December 19, 1989, the minister of finance announced a reduction in the rate of the GST from 9 to 7% and a reduction of the GSTC yearly amount from $275 to $190 per adult. The amount of the GSTC relative to a child was left unchanged at $100.

The bill legislating the GST and the amendments in the Income Tax Act received royal assent on December 17, 1990, mere days prior to its planned introduction on January 1, 1991. It repealed section 122.4 which provided the former federal sales tax credit and created section 122.5 which provided for the new GSTC.

== See also ==
=== Related articles ===
- Goods and Services Tax (Canada)
- Canada Child Benefit

=== External links ===
- Department of Finance Canada (January 26, 2026). "The new Canada Groceries and Essentials Benefit". www.canada.ca. Ottawa: Government of Canada.
