= 1986 Canadian federal budget =

Michael Wilson and the Mulroney government's second national spending plan

1986 Budget of the Canadian Federal Government
- Presented: 26 February 1986
- Country: Canada
- Parliament: 33rd
- Party: Progressive Conservative
- Finance minister: Michael Wilson
- Total revenue: 86.746 billion
- Total expenditures: 116.588 billion
- Deficit: $29.842 billion

The Canadian federal budget for fiscal year 1986–87 was presented by Minister of Finance Michael Wilson in the House of Commons of Canada on 26 February 1986.

== Taxes ==
=== Tax increases ===
The budget imposed a series of new taxes to increase government revenues:

- A 3% surtax on all individuals starting on 1 July 1986;
  - The surtax instituted by the previous budget is continued until its scheduled end. The two surtaxes are in effect simultaneously from 1 July to 31 December 1986. (Note: The general surtax is applied at a rate of 1.5% on income earned during the whole of 1986.)
- A 3% surtax on all corporations starting on 1 January 1987;
  - The previous 5% on large corporation is set to expire on 31 December 1986, as originally planned;
- A 1% increase in the federal sales tax rate effective 1 April 1986;
- Increases in excise taxes and duties on alcohol (4% increase) and tobacco (6% increase) with immediate effect.

=== Tax incentives ===
The budget announced two improvements to social assistance tax incentives:

- The creation of the refundable federal sales tax credit, a new refundable tax credit of up to $50 per person per year;
- A prepayment system is instituted for the child tax credit : advance payments are to be maid in November 1986 to claimants with low-income. Revenue Canada will used past tax returns to automatically assess eligibility.

=== Corporate tax reform ===
The budget announced a reform of the corporate tax system: several tax incentives are abolished and a schedule of corporate tax rate decrease is announced.

Date	Corporate tax rate		
Date	Base rate	M&P (Note: Manufacturing and processing income.)	Small business (Note: Applies of a maximum of $200,000 income eligible for the small business deduction.)
As of budget date	36%	30%	15%
1 July 1987	35%	28%	14%
1 July 1988	34%	27%	13 %
1 July 1989	33%	26%	13 %

== Expenditures ==
The budget announced the government would ask members of the House of Commons and Senate to take a $1,000 pay cut in 1986, matching an identical cut to the salary of the Prime Minister and all cabinet ministers. The salaries of deputy ministers and political staff was also to be frozen in 1986, with other executives public servant to receive pay increases not exceeding 2%.

Cuts of $500 million in non-statutory spending for 1986–87 was also announced, with details to be released after the budget. Official Development Assistance (i.e. international aid) was to be cut by $83 millions and $203 millions (in 1986–87 and 1987–88 respectively) despite the government's pledge to bring the ODA budget to 0.6% of GNP by 1990.

=== Privatization ===
The budget announced the privatization efforts were to continue with multiple state-owned corporations to be sold to the private sector. (Note: The budget lists notably : Canadian Arsenals, Northern Canada Power Commission, remaining assets of the Canada Development Investment Corporation, Teleglobe, Canadair and Eldorado Nuclear.)

== Reactions ==
=== Media ===
Most newspapers focused on the tax increases announced in the budget (notably the surtax and the excise tax increases) with the following front page headlines:

Income, alcohol, cigaret taxes up in Wilson's deficit-cutting budget

— The Globe and Mail

OUCH: Wilson puts $1.5-billion bite on taxpayers to cut deficit

— The Ottawa Citizen

Income tax, levies on booze, tobacco rise to fight deficit

— The Gazette (Montreal)

Hausse d'impôts de $1,5 milliard

$1.5 billion tax hikes

— La Presse

The Globe and Mail editorial received the budget favorably, pointing at several welcome initiatives (corporate and sales taxes reform, tightening of tax incentives) and overall commitment to fiscal responsibility. Frédéric Wagnière in La Presse was more nuanced, pointing that the mix between tax increases and budget cuts seemed to focus more on the former, with a risk of hindering the economic recovery.

== Aftermath ==
=== Execution ===
Budgetary items in billions of dollars
Element	1985-1986	1986-1987	
Element	Actual	Budget	Actual
Tax revenues	71.61	87.30	79.87
Non-tax revenues	5.22	87.30	5.91
Program expenditures	(85.79)	(89.37)	(89.73)
Public debt charge	(25.44)	(27.38)	(26.66)
Deficit	(34.40)	(29.50)	(30.61)
Non-budgetary transactions	4.13	6.90	9.04
Financial requirements	(30.27)	(22.6)	(21.57)

== Notes and references ==
=== References ===
==== Budget documents ====
- The Budget Speech (PDF). Ottawa. 26 February 1986.
- Budget Papers (PDF). Ottawa. 26 February 1986.

==== Draft and enacted legislation ====
- Technical Notes to a Notice of Ways and Means Motion Relating to Income Tax (PDF). Ottawa: Department of Finance. October 1986. p. 103.
- An Act to amend the Income Tax Act and a related Act, S.C. 1986, c. 55
