= 2011 British Columbia sales tax referendum =

HST (Harmonized Sales Tax) Referendum, 2011
- June 13, 2011
- Are you in favour of extinguishing the HST (Harmonized Sales Tax) and reinstating the PST (Provincial Sales Tax) in conjunction with the GST (Goods and Services Tax)?
- Voting system: Simple majority
- Website: Reports, Elections BC

Results
Choice	Votes	%
Yes	881,198	54.73%
No	728,927	45.27%
Valid votes	1,610,125	99.82%
Invalid or blank votes	2,977	0.18%
Total votes	1,613,102	100.00%
Registered voters/turnout	3,063,170	52.66%
- Results by riding

A referendum on sales tax was held by postal ballot in British Columbia from June 13 to August 5, 2011, though Canada Post workers were locked out until June 27. Voters were asked whether the Harmonized Sales Tax (HST) should be retained or split back to the original Provincial Sales Tax (PST) and Goods & Services Tax (GST). If the majority of voters voted "Yes" to extinguish the HST, 7% PST would be reinstated and the combined tax rate would remain at 12%. If the majority of voters voted "No", the BC government would reduce the HST rate to 11% in 2012 and 10% in 2014.

The yes side passed with 54.73%.

== Question ==
Are you in favour of extinguishing the HST (Harmonized Sales Tax) and reinstating the PST (Provincial Sales Tax) in conjunction with the GST (Goods and Services Tax)?

== Results ==
British Columbia sales tax referendum, 2011
Side	Votes	%
Yes	881,198	54.73%
No	728,927	45.27%

== Results by region ==
British Columbia 2011 Sale Tax Referendum Results by Geographic Area
Geographic Area	% Yes	% No	% Voter Turnout
North / Central	57.5%	42.5%	45.9%
Southern Interior	54.5%	45.5%	53.1%
Fraser Valley / South Lower Mainland	55.4%	44.6%	52.9%
Vancouver / North Lower Mainland	54.7%	45.3%	51.9%
Vancouver Island	56.1%	43.9%	55.8%

== Results by riding ==
British Columbia 2011 Sale Tax Referendum Results by Riding
Riding	% Yes	% No	% Voter Turnout
Abbotsford South	45.4%	54.6%	51.6%
Abbotsford West	43.3%	56.7%	50.4%
Abbotsford-Mission	48.5%	51.5%	51.5%
Alberni-Pacific Rim	63.9%	36.1%	53.6%
Boundary-Similkameen	59.5%	40.5%	56.5%
Burnaby-Deer Lake	62.6%	37.4%	51%
Burnaby-Edmonds	64.6%	35.4%	51.5%
Burnaby-Lougheed	58.8%	41.2%	54.1%
Burnaby North	60.3%	39.7%	54.2%
Cariboo-Chilcotin	56.9%	43.1%	54%
Cariboo North	59%	41%	51.6%
Chilliwack	49%	51%	53.2%
Chilliwack-Hope	49.6%	50.4%	53.8%
Columbia River-Revelstoke	66.2%	33.8%	51.8%
Comox Valley	53.5%	46.5%	56.3%
Coquitlam-Burke Mountain	55.9%	44.1%	54.5%
Coquitlam-Maillardville	54.6%	45.4%	58.3%
Cowichan Valley	55.6%	44.4%	56.7%
Delta North	58.4%	41.6%	55.6%
Delta South	46.5%	53.5%	61.6%
Esquimalt-Royal Roads	58%	42%	54.2%
Fort Langley-Aldergrove	45.8%	54.2%	54.1%
Fraser-Nicola	55.3%	44.7%	56.7%
Juan de Fuca	62.5%	37.5%	54.6%
Kamloops-North Thompson	54.7%	45.3%	50.4%
Kamloops-South Thompson	44.1%	55.9%	55.1%
Kelowna-Lake Country	46.9%	53.1%	51.7%
Kelowna-Mission	44.4%	55.6%	51.8%
Kootenay East	60.9%	39.1%	53.3%
Kootenay West	69.6%	30.4%	54.6%
Langley	48.7%	51.3%	55%
Maple Ridge-Mission	55.8%	44.2%	52.2%
Maple Ridge-Pitt Meadows	56.9%	43.1%	54.1%
Nanaimo	55.2%	44.8%	53.1%
Nanaimo-North Cowichan	60.8%	39.2%	57.2%
Nechako Lakes	46.7%	53.3%	48.1%
Nelson-Creston	63.8%	36.2%	51.1%
New Westminster	57.3%	42.7%	53.8%
North Coast	67.2%	32.8%	40.8%
North Island	58%	42%	51.8%
North Vancouver-Lonsdale	48.2%	51.8%	51.9%
North Vancouver-Seymour	39.4%	60.6%	59%
Oak Bay-Gordon Head	48.6%	51.4%	58.4%
Parksville-Qualicum	51.6%	48.4%	65.1%
Peace River North	50%	50%	37.2%
Peace River South	58.8%	41.2%	39.9%
Penticton	50.5%	49.5%	54.1%
Port Coquitlam	55.6%	44.4%	54.2%
Port Moody-Coquitlam	50.9%	49.1%	54.6%
Powell River-Sunshine Coast	58.2%	41.8%	57.4%
Prince George-Mackenzie	56.9%	43.1%	47.7%
Prince George-Valemount	58.7%	41.3%	46.9%
Richmond Centre	63.8%	36.2%	46.6%
Richmond East	65.6%	34.4%	51.8%
Richmond-Steveston	55.2%	44.8%	55.7%
Saanich North and the Islands	51.3%	48.7%	61.4%
Saanich South	52.5%	47.5%	61.6%
Shuswap	49.8%	50.2%	55.2%
Skeena	66.7%	33.3%	45.8%
Stikine	53.5%	46.5%	47.4%
Surrey-Cloverdale	47.5%	52.5%	55.5%
Surrey-Fleetwood	63.1%	36.9%	53.5%
Surrey-Green Timbers	75.5%	24.5%	47.6%
Surrey-Newton	72.2%	27.8%	47.5%
Surrey-Panorama	53.3%	46.7%	54%
Surrey-Tynehead	59.5%	40.5%	51.1%
Surrey-Whalley	68.9%	31.1%	45.5%
Surrey-White Rock	45.5%	54.5%	61.4%
Vancouver-Fairview	47.2%	52.8%	42.2%
Vancouver-False Creek	44.4%	55.6%	40.2%
Vancouver-Fraserview	66%	34%	61.4%
Vancouver-Hastings	66.9%	33.1%	50.3%
Vancouver-Kensington	69.5%	30.5%	52.7%
Vancouver-Kingsway	72.4%	27.6%	51.9%
Vancouver-Langara	61.7%	38.3%	50.4%
Vancouver-Mount Pleasant	63.9%	36.1%	39.3%
Vancouver-Point Grey	41.9%	58.1%	46.9%
Vancouver-Quilchena	37.6%	62.4%	55.2%
Vancouver-West End	53.9%	46.1%	43.2%
Vernon-Monashee	50.9%	49.1%	53.6%
Victoria-Beacon Hill	55.8%	44.2%	47.3%
Victoria-Swan Lake	57.7%	42.3%	49.6%
West Vancouver-Capilano	35.5%	64.5%	61.6%
West Vancouver-Sea to Sky	39.2%	60.8%	47.6%
Westside-Kelowna	46.3%	53.7%	47.6%
