= Harmonized sales tax =

Canadian consumption tax

The harmonized sales tax (HST; French: taxe de vente harmonisée, TVH) is a consumption tax in Canada. It is used in provinces where both the federal goods and services tax (GST) and the regional provincial sales tax (PST) have been combined into a single value-added tax.

== Functioning ==
=== Jurisdiction ===
The HST is in effect in five of the ten Canadian provinces: New Brunswick, Newfoundland and Labrador, Nova Scotia, Ontario and Prince Edward Island. The HST is collected by the Canada Revenue Agency (CRA), which remits the appropriate amounts to the participating provinces. The HST may differ across these five provinces, as each province will set its own PST rates within the HST. In provinces and territories which have not enacted the HST, the CRA collects only the 5% goods and services tax and the provincial government either imposes its own sales tax or in Alberta's case, it does not have a sale tax.

HST needs to be filed monthly, quarterly, or annually, depending on the annual revenue of the business.

The current rates by province are as follows:

Province	HST Rate (%)
New Brunswick	15
Newfoundland and Labrador	15
Nova Scotia	14
Ontario	13
Prince Edward Island	15

The introduction of the HST changed the PST for these provinces from a cascading tax system, which has been abandoned by most economies throughout the world, to a value-added tax like the GST.

=== Affected items ===
- In Ontario, the HST increased tax on gasoline and diesel from 5% to 13%.
- In British Columbia, the HST applied on motor fuel and diesel but the 7% provincial portion was refunded at the point of sale, meaning the effective tax would remain at 5%, the rate of the GST.
- PST was only applicable to goods, whereas HST is generally applicable to both goods and services. Service items from haircuts to carpet cleaning that previously include only the five per cent GST saw an increase in costs. However, in Ontario the PST portion of the HST will be exempt on newspapers and fast food items not exceeding $4 per purchase.
- In Ontario, a rebate compensating for the HST leaves the first $400,000 of a new home purchase unaffected whereas the portion of a home above $400,000 will be charged the full HST. However, buyers of new homes can receive a rebate of up to $24,000 regardless of the price of the new home. The CRA has been actively reassessing many purchasers of newly constructed homes in Ontario and disallowing their claim for the HST New Housing Rebate.
- There is also an HST Rebate in Ontario for rental properties called the HST New Residential Rental Rebate which provides up to a $24,000 HST rebate on the purchase of a new residential complex that is first used as a rental property.
- For Ontarians HST is not charged on the resale of an existing home, however renovations are taxable.
- Ontarians are paying more for management and other fees associated with investment funds, such as: mutual funds, segregated funds and ETFs.

=== Exemptions ===
- Most provinces under HST exempt books from the tax, either through an outright exemption, or through a point-of-sale rebate.
- Nova Scotia exempts residential heating sources from HST, such as fuel oil, electricity used for residential heating, fire wood, and wood pellets.
- Ontario exempts HST from being charged to household goods such as "children's clothing and shoes, books, car seats, diapers and feminine hygiene products". British Columbia did the same thing before reverting to PST/GST.
- British Columbia exempted HST for public transit fares, BC Ferries tickets, bridge and road tolls.
- In Ontario, First Nations status card holders are exempt from the provincial part of the HST for eligible off-reserve purchases. This exemption is in addition to the relief provided to First Nations under the GST/HST framework, such as for purchases on a reserve or delivered to a reserve.
- Prince Edward Island exempts residential fuel oil used for heating, as well as some clothing, books and personal care items.

=== Individual tax credit ===
To help maintain revenue neutrality of total taxes on individuals, the Canadian government (for the GST) and the participating provincial governments have accompanied the change from a cascading tax to a value-add tax with a reduction in income taxes, and instituted direct transfer payments (refundable tax credits) to lower-income groups. The federal government provided a refundable Goods and Services Tax Credit of up to $248 per adult and $130 per child to low income people for 2009-10. In 2026, the credit was replaced with an Essentials and Groceries Benefit Provinces offer similar adjustments, such as Newfoundland and Labrador providing a refundable tax credit of up to $40 per adult and $60 for each child.

== History ==
=== 1997 implementation ===
In 1996, three of the four Atlantic provinces—New Brunswick, Newfoundland and Labrador, and Nova Scotia—entered into an agreement with the Government of Canada to implement what was initially termed the "blended sales tax" (renamed to "harmonized sales tax") which would combine the 7% federal GST with the provincial sales taxes of those provinces; as part of this project, the PST portion of the new HST in these provinces dropped from 10% to 8%. The result was a 15% combined tax when the federal GST was added. The new tax for these provinces went into effect on April 1, 1997.

The HST is collected by the Canada Revenue Agency, which then remits the appropriate amounts to the participating provinces. Subsequent studies have been equivocal as to the success of this implementation for these provinces' economies and their consumers.

=== 2006 and 2008 GST reductions ===
On July 1, 2006, the Government of Canada reduced the GST nationwide to 6%, resulting in a combined HST for Nova Scotia, New Brunswick and Newfoundland and Labrador of 14%. The GST was again lowered nationwide on January 1, 2008 to its current rate of 5%, resulting in a combined HST in Nova Scotia, New Brunswick and Newfoundland and Labrador of 13%.

=== 2010, 2016 HST increases ===
On April 6, 2010, the Government of Nova Scotia raised the provincial portion of the HST to 10%, restoring the overall rate in that province to 15% effective July 1, 2010 as part of deficit fighting measures. On April 2, 2012 the premier indicated that the provincial government was planning to decrease the HST back to 13% by 2015 but this has since been cancelled by a new government.

New Brunswick and Newfoundland raised their HST back to 15% in 2016.

=== 2010 implementation ===
The Government of Canada's 2008 federal budget called sales tax harmonization "the single most important step provinces with retail sales taxes could take to improve the competitiveness of Canadian businesses" and federal finance officials began to pressure/entice non-HST provinces to abandon their PST systems.

Consequently, in 2008 and 2009, the provinces of Ontario and British Columbia entered into negotiations with the Government of Canada for adopting the HST.

On March 26, 2009, in its annual budget, the province of Ontario announced its intention to merge the PST and GST to take effect on July 1, 2010.

On July 1, 2010 the HST was implemented in the provinces of Ontario and British Columbia, despite public opinion polls showing that 82% of British Columbians and 74% of Ontarians opposed it before it was implemented. The implementation of HST in British Columbia and Ontario replaced the separate GST and PST charged on goods and services in those provinces. Evidence from numerous studies demonstrated that tax harmonization raises business investment and that PST-type taxes slowed provincial economic growth. British Columbia combined the 5% GST with a 7% PST and implemented the HST at a rate of 12% and committed to lowering the HST by two further points, to 10%, by 2014. Ontario's HST rate is 13%, similar to New Brunswick and Newfoundland and Labrador.

Ontario committed to provide a refundable tax credit of up to $260 per adult or child in 2010–11 to low income people, and British Columbia committed to provide a refundable tax credit of up to $230 per adult or child in 2010–11. Federal and provincial tax credits are paid quarterly through the year. British Columbia also provided a one-time transition payment of $175 to low and modest income seniors as well as $175 for each child under 18 to every family with children. British Columbia’s low income credit was mailed out to 1.1 million British Columbians every three months and amounted to up to $230 annually per individual.

On May 4, 2011, an independent panel commissioned by the British Columbia government released a report on the impact of the HST in that province. The report concluded that "Unless you are among the 15 per cent of families with an income under $10,000 a year, you're paying more sales tax under the HST than you would under the PST/GST: On average about $350 per family." The report also predicted that by 2020, the HST is anticipated to result in a BC economy that will "be $2.5 billion larger than it would be under the PST. That's about $480 per person or $830 per family." British Columbia residents voted in a referendum in August 2011 to repeal the HST, resulting in the province reverting to the former PST/GST model, with rates of 7% and 5% respectively, on April 1, 2013.

=== 2013 implementation ===
In the provincial budget released April 18, 2012, the Government of Prince Edward Island announced plans to introduce a 14% HST to be implemented on April 1, 2013. This would reduce Prince Edward Island's provincial sales tax component from 10% to 9%. The Government of Prince Edward Island was unique amongst Canadian provinces in that it "taxed the GST". Since the implementation of the federal GST in 1990, PEI's 10% PST has been charged on the subtotal of goods which included the federal GST; PST was not charged on services. This resulted in a combined tax of 17.7% for goods purchased before the 7% GST was reduced to 6% and then 5% in 2006 and 2008 respectively. As of 2012, consumers in PEI paid a combined 15.5% tax rate (5% GST and 10% PST applied to the subtotal). The provincial government committed to exempting some items while critics noted that electricity would see an increase from 5% GST to 14% HST; prior to the HST, electricity was not taxed by the PST.

The HST was introduced to Prince Edward Island on April 1, 2013 which dropped the tax on goods to 14% from 15.5% and raised the tax on services from 5% (GST) to 14%.

== Reception ==
=== In British Columbia and Ontario ===
A study, conducted by the CD Howe Institute before announcements to exempt low value purchases, found B.C. and Ontario's HST likely revenue neutral. A separate report from the Roger Martin task force on the economy found the HST would lower taxes overall as "increased revenue from the harmonized sales tax is matched by reductions in corporate and personal taxes and by tax credits. The effect is revenue loss." The Globe and Mail reporting on the study found that the "Ontario government will actually lose revenue." In a report by researcher David Murrell for the Canadian Centre for Policy Studies, the net impact of the tax was expected to be "modestly progressive" for the poorest households to upper-middle-income families while increasing taxes by $320 in British Columbia and $290 in Ontario.

In November 2009, an Ipsos Reid poll found that the vast majority of British Columbians (82%) and Ontarians (74%) opposed their provincial governments' plans to harmonize the sales tax. Only 39% of the public believed the HST would be beneficial for businesses whereas the Task Force on Competitiveness, Productivity and Economic Progress concluded that a harmonized sales tax would reduce administrative costs for small businesses and lead to reduction in taxes, as they would recover sales taxes they would have paid on goods and services they purchased. Additionally, only 10% of the public agreed that the move would create more jobs. A study by Jack Mintz of the University of Calgary School of Public Policy suggested the HST and a drop in the corporate tax rate would have created almost 600,000 new jobs over ten years.

=== Rejection in British Columbia ===
The introduction of HST in British Columbia was extremely unpopular, due to its perception as a "tax hike" and the fact that Premier Gordon Campbell had denied any plans to implement the HST before the 2009 election, only to introduce it anyway shortly after winning a majority government.

Former British Columbia Premier Bill Vander Zalm launched a petition against the HST in response to the public outrage. On August 11, 2010, Elections BC informed him that the campaign had succeeded in collecting the signatures of more than 10% of registered voters in each of the province's 85 ridings by July 5, 2010. The success of the petition could require the provincial government to hold a referendum on the tax. Elections BC was expected to make a formal announcement but they declined to do so and chose not to move forward in the process until the courts decided on a case, brought by local business groups, challenging the petition. On Monday, July 5, 2010, Bill Vander Zalm, Chis Delaney and Bill Tieleman announced that they had launched their own lawsuit, a constitutional challenge against the HST because it was never passed into law by the British Columbia's provincial legislature. On August 20, 2010, Chief Justice Robert J. Bauman ruled a petition opposing British Columbia's controversial harmonized sales tax was valid. This decision sent the issue back to the provincial legislature. Bauman said Elections BC was correct when it approved the petition on August 11.

The approval of the petition to recall the HST in British Columbia paved the way for a referendum that allowed British Columbians to decide the fate of the tax system. Elections BC conducted the referendum via mail-in ballot, allowing registered voters to send in their decision in regards to the HST. The 2011 British Columbia sales tax referendum was conducted throughout June and July 2011. In an attempt to appease public anger, the government pledged the referendum would be binding and that they would abide by the will of the people. The Question on the ballot was: "Are you in favour of extinguishing the HST (Harmonized Sales Tax) and reinstating the PST (Provincial Sales Tax) in conjunction with the GST (Goods and Services Tax)? Yes or No"

In November 2010, Gordon Campbell resigned as Premier, noting that his own unpopularity had effectively stopped the government from moving forward with its agenda and made real discussion about the HST impossible. He was replaced by Christy Clark.

The ruling BC Liberals had campaigned in favour of the HST since its introduction the previous year, noting it would be too costly to return to the original GST/PST system; they pointed to the money they would have to pay back to Ottawa, the lost tax revenue, and the amount it would cost taxpayers to have to switch back and forth between tax systems. In April 2011, British Columbia Premier Christy Clark announced a province-wide engagement initiative to listen to British Columbians' suggestions to "fix" the HST.

Faced with plummeting support and the ongoing anger against the HST, in May 2011 Minister of Finance Kevin Falcon announced that if British Columbians vote to keep the HST the rate will drop by 1% on July 1, 2012 and another point in 2014. This will bring the overall rate to 10%. The provincial government also committed to mailing onetime transition payments of $175 per child to families with children and $175 for low and middle income seniors. A month later, the federal government passed legislation to "formalize and give legal force to the reductions in the rate of the provincial component of the HST in British Columbia".

On August 26, 2011, the results of the referendum were revealed by Elections BC, with 55% of 1.6 million voters in favour of abolishing the HST. Retaining the HST was most popular in affluent and highly educated ridings and those with a significant proportion of family businesses. The BC Liberals revealed a plan to reinstate the GST/PST system within 18 months, with a target date of March 31, 2013. As a direct result, British Columbia will have to pay back $1.6 billion to the federal government in order to opt out of the HST program.

On April 1, 2013, British Columbia abandoned the HST and reverted to the GST/PST system.

== See also ==
- Goods and services tax (Canada)
- Sales taxes in British Columbia
- Sales taxes in Canada
