= Sales taxes in Canada =

Type of taxation in Canada

In Canada, there are two types of sales taxes levied. These are :

- Provincial sales taxes or PST (French: Taxes de vente provinciale - TVP), levied by the provinces.
- Goods and services tax or GST (French: Taxe sur les produits et services - TPS) / Harmonized sales tax or HST (French: Taxe de vente harmonisée - TVH), a value-added tax levied by the federal government. The GST applies nationally. The HST includes the provincial portion of the sales tax but is administered by the Canada Revenue Agency (CRA) and is applied under the same legislation as the GST. The HST is in effect in Ontario, New Brunswick, Newfoundland and Labrador, Nova Scotia and Prince Edward Island.

Every province except Alberta has implemented either a provincial sales tax or the Harmonized Sales Tax. The federal GST rate is 5 percent, effective January 1, 2008.

The territories of Yukon, Northwest Territories, and Nunavut have no territorial sales taxes, so only the GST is collected. The three northern jurisdictions are partially subsidized by the federal government, and their residents receive some additional tax concessions due to the high cost of living in the north.

== Provincial sales taxes ==
Separate provincial sales taxes (PST) are collected in the provinces of British Columbia, Saskatchewan, Manitoba (retail sales tax or RST) and Quebec (Quebec sales tax or QST, French: Taxe de vente du Québec or TVQ). Prince Edward Island switched to a HST on April 1, 2013, on the same day that British Columbia reverted to a separate GST/PST, from a short-lived HST that was put in place in 2010 but rejected by voters in a referendum soon after. Goods to which the tax is applied vary by province, as does the rate. In all provinces where the provincial sales tax is collected, the tax is imposed on the sale price without GST (in the past, in Quebec and in Prince Edward Island, PST was applied to the combined sum of sale price and GST). Of the provincial sales taxes, only the QST is a value-added tax.

Province	Type	Prov. rate (%)	Total tax rate (%)	Notes
Alberta	GST	0	5	Short-term accommodation is subject to 5% federal GST and the Alberta Tourism Levy. The Tourism Levy increased from 4% to 6% effective April 1, 2026, making the standard combined government tax on most post-March 31, 2026 accommodation bookings 11%. Bookings made before April 1, 2026 may remain subject to the former 4% levy.
British Columbia	GST + PST	7	12	Main article: Sales taxes in British Columbia Reverted to a separate GST/PST on April 1, 2013, with a PST of 7%, after their adoption of a HST in 2010 was rejected in a referendum. A higher 10% PST rate applies to liquor.
Manitoba	GST + RST	7	12	The RST was increased one point to 8% on July 1, 2013. It reverted to 7% as of July 1, 2019 and although it was planned to drop to 6% as of July 1, 2020 due to the COVID-19 pandemic the province has deferred the reduction until further notice. Manitoba municipalities may also impose separate local taxes by by-law, including taxes on motel and hotel accommodation; such by-laws must set the tax rate and receive provincial approval before taking effect. Examples include Winnipeg, which increased its accommodation tax from 5% to 6% effective April 1, 2024, while other Manitoba municipalities such as Brandon, Portage la Prairie, Thompson, The Pas, Gimli, Churchill, Dauphin, and Flin Flon may set their own local accommodation-tax rates.
New Brunswick	HST	N/A	15	The HST was increased two points to 15% on July 1, 2016.
Newfoundland and Labrador	HST	N/A	15	The HST was increased two points to 15% on July 1, 2016.
Nova Scotia	HST	N/A	14	The HST was reduced from 15% to 14% starting April 1, 2025.
Ontario	HST	N/A	13	
Prince Edward Island	HST	N/A	15	The HST was increased one point to 15% on October 1, 2016.
Quebec	GST + QST	9.975	14.975	Books are taxed at 5.0% (considered essential goods for QST but not for GST). There is an additional tax on tourist lodgings such as hotels which is usually 3.5%. This tax does not apply in Nunavik.
Saskatchewan	GST + PST	6	11	The 6% rate is effective for goods and services effective March 23, 2017. Effective April 1, 2017, New Homes, restaurant meals and other prepared food and beverages are subject to PST. Special rules apply in Lloydminster, Saskatchewan: PST is generally not collected on goods delivered to or picked up in Lloydminster for use or consumption within the city limits, subject to exceptions such as vehicles, lodging, telecommunication services, commercial electricity, and insurance contracts; liquor sales there are also exempt from Saskatchewan’s Liquor Consumption Tax.

== New housing rebate ==
Sales taxes on new or significantly renovated housing used as a primary residence may be eligible to have a portion of charged federal and provincial sales taxes rebated. New homes valued up to $450,000 may be eligible for a 36% rebate on GST charged up to a maximum of $6,300. Provincial sales tax rebate programs on new housing are offered in Ontario, British Columbia, Nova Scotia, Saskatchewan, and Quebec (for QST). Terms and conditions vary by province.
