= Goods and services tax (Canada) =

Federal value-added tax in Canada

The goods and services tax (GST; French: Taxe sur les produits et services) is a value added tax introduced in Canada on January 1, 1991, by the government of Prime Minister Brian Mulroney. The GST, which is administered by Canada Revenue Agency (CRA), replaced a previous hidden 13.5% manufacturers' sales tax (MST).

Introduced at an original rate of 7%, the GST rate has been lowered twice and currently sits at rate of 5%, since January 1, 2008. The GST raised 11.2% of total federal government revenue in 2023–2024.

In five provinces, Nova Scotia, New Brunswick, Newfoundland and Labrador, Ontario and Prince Edward Island, the GST is combined with provincial sales tax (PST) into a harmonized sales tax (HST). In Quebec both GST and QST are collected and administered together by the provincial government. British Columbia had an HST from 2010 until 2013, when it was removed after a provincial referendum. Alberta and the territories of Yukon, Northwest Territories and Nunavut have the GST but no provincial or territorial sales taxes.

== Definition ==
The goods and services tax is defined in law at Part IX of the Excise Tax Act. GST is levied on supplies of goods or services purchased in Canada and includes most products, except certain politically sensitive essentials such as groceries, residential rent, medical services, and services such as financial services. Businesses that purchase goods and services that are consumed, used or supplied in the course of their "commercial activities" can claim "input tax credits" subject to prescribed documentation requirements (i.e., when they remit to the Canada Revenue Agency the GST they have collected in any given period of time, they are allowed to deduct the amount of GST they paid during that period). This avoids "cascading" (i.e., the application of the GST on the same good or service several times as it passes from business to business on its way to the final consumer). In this way, the tax is essentially borne by the final consumer. This system is not completely effective, as shown by criminals who defrauded the system by claiming GST input credits for non-existent sales by a fictional company. Exported goods are "zero-rated", while individuals with low incomes can receive a GST rebate calculated in conjunction with their income tax.

== Untaxed items ==
The tax is a 5% tax imposed on the supply of goods and services that are purchased in Canada, except certain items that are either "exempt" or "zero-rated":

- For tax-free — i.e., "zero-rated" — sales, GST is charged by suppliers at a rate of 0% so effectively there is no GST collected. However, when a supplier makes a zero-rated supply, it is eligible to recover any GST paid on purchases used in producing the particular supply or service. This effectively removes the cascading tax from these particular goods and services.
  - Common zero-rated items include basic groceries, prescription drugs, inward/outbound transportation and medical devices (GST/HST Memoranda Series ME-04-02-9801-E 4.2 Medical and Assistive Devices). Certain exports of goods and services are also zero-rated. Print books and print scholarly journals are untaxed; however, ebooks and online periodicals are taxed as well as any periodicals with a significant amount of advertising.
- For tax-exempt supplies, the supply is not subject to GST and suppliers do not charge tax on their exempt supplies. Furthermore, suppliers that make exempt supplies are not entitled to recover GST paid on inputs acquired for the purposes of making the exempt good or service (subject to certain public sector body rebates). Tax-exempt items include long term residential rents, health and dental care, educational services, day-care services, music lessons, legal aid services, and financial services.

== Background ==
In 1989, the Progressive Conservative government of Prime Minister Brian Mulroney and his finance minister Michael Wilson proposed the creation of a national sales tax of 9%. At that time, every province in Canada except Alberta already had its own provincial sales tax imposed at the retail level.

The purpose of the national sales tax was to replace the 13.5% Manufacturers' Sales Tax (MST) that the federal government imposed at the wholesale level on manufactured goods. Mulroney claimed the GST was implemented because the MST was hindering the manufacturing sector's ability to export competitively. Manufacturers were concerned that the tax hurt their international competitiveness. The GST also replaced the Federal Telecommunications Tax of 11%.

The introduction of the GST was very controversial. Although the GST was promoted as revenue-neutral in relation to the MST, a large proportion of the Canadian population disapproved of the tax. The other parties in Parliament also attacked the idea as did three Progressive Conservative Members of Parliament, David Kilgour, Pat Nowlan, and Alex Kindy, who ended up leaving the Progressive Conservative caucus as a result.

The Liberal-dominated Senate refused to pass the tax into law. In an unprecedented move to break the deadlock, Mulroney used a little-known constitutional provision (Section 26 of the Constitution Act, 1867) to increase the number of senators by eight temporarily, thus giving the Progressive Conservatives a majority in the upper chamber. In response, the Opposition launched a filibuster and further delayed the legislation.

Despite the tax being lowered to 7% by the time it became enacted, it remained controversial. What the tax covered also caused anger. The Government defended the tax as a replacement for a tax unseen by consumers because it was placed on manufacturers, and in the long run it was posited that removing the MST would make Canada more competitive. Once the MST was replaced with the GST prices did not initially fall by the level some thought appropriate immediately; however, proponents have argued that in Canada's market economy the MST's replacement could only be expected to influence prices over time and not on a stroke.

Despite the opposition, the tax came into force on January 1, 1991.

== Reactions ==
A strong Liberal Party majority was elected under the leadership of Jean Chrétien in the 1993 election. The Progressive Conservative Party fared very poorly in that election, winning only two seats. Although the party recovered somewhat in subsequent elections, it remained the smallest party in the House of Commons until it disbanded itself permanently in 2003, and merged with the Canadian Alliance to form the Conservative Party of Canada.

During the election campaign, Chrétien promised to repeal the GST, which the Liberals had denounced while they were the Official Opposition, and replace it with a different tax. Instead of repeal, the Chrétien government attempted to restructure the tax and merge it with the provincial sales taxes in each province. They intended to call it the "Blended Sales Tax", but opponents quickly came to derisively call this proposal the "B.S. Tax", and the name was changed to Harmonized Sales Tax before its introduction. However, only three Atlantic provinces (Nova Scotia, New Brunswick and Newfoundland and Labrador) agreed to go along with this plan, joined by British Columbia and Ontario in 2010, and Prince Edward Island in 2013. British Columbia later repealed the tax.

The decision not to abolish or replace the GST caused great controversy. Liberal Member of Parliament (MP) John Nunziata voted against the Liberal government's first budget and was expelled from the party. Heritage Minister Sheila Copps, who had personally promised to oppose the tax, resigned and sought re-election. She was re-elected with ease in the subsequent by-election, as was the Liberal government in the 1997 election.

== Provincial variance ==
In 1997, the provinces of Nova Scotia, New Brunswick and Newfoundland (now Newfoundland and Labrador) and the Government of Canada merged their respective sales taxes into the Harmonized Sales Tax (HST). In all Atlantic provinces, the current HST rate is 15%. HST is administered by the Canada Revenue Agency, with revenues divided among participating governments according to a formula. Ontario and British Columbia both harmonized the GST with their provincial sales tax (PST) effective July 1, 2010. However, the British Columbia HST was defeated in an August 2011 mail-in referendum by a 55% majority vote, and was converted to the old GST/PST system effective April 1, 2013. On the same day, Prince Edward Island enacted HST at the rate of 14%. In Ontario, the HST totals 13%; however, many of the pre-HST exemptions remain affecting only the provincial portion of the HST (for example, prepared food under $4.00 is not subject to the provincial portion of HST and is only taxed at 5%). On the other hand, some items that were only subjected to the PST are now charged the full HST (i.e., 13%). Although the Government of Ontario has made efforts to provide documentation as to what items are affected and how, this causes some confusion for consumers as they are often not sure what taxes to expect at the checkout. To accommodate these exemptions, many retailers simply display each tax individually as HST 1 and HST 2 (or some variant). The move to HST came about as part of Ontario's 2009 provincial budget. Only three provinces (British Columbia, Manitoba, and Saskatchewan) continue to impose a separate sales tax at the retail level only. Alberta is the exception, not imposing a provincial sales tax.

== Current situation ==
During the campaign for the 2006 Canadian federal election, the Conservative Party, led by Stephen Harper, pledged to reduce the GST immediately by 1 percentage point and thereafter by another percentage point in the next five years. That pledge was criticized by then Finance Minister Ralph Goodale as favouring the "biggest spenders" who would receive the biggest savings. Stephen Harper's Conservatives won that election and formed a minority government on February 6, 2006. On July 1, 2006, the Government of Canada reduced the tax by 1 percentage point (to 6%). They again lowered it to 5%, effective January 1, 2008. This reduction was included in the Final 2007 Budget Implementation Bill (Bill C-28), which received Royal Assent on December 14, 2007. This change has been estimated to have decreased government revenues by approximately $6 billion. Opponents of these tax decreases cited that sales taxes target those who spend more and therefore such reductions disproportionately benefit Canadians giving those who have the most and spend the most the largest tax decrease.

Much of the reason for the notoriety of the GST in Canada is for reasons of the Division of Powers in the Constitution. Other countries with a Value Added Tax legislate that posted prices include the tax; thus, consumers are vaguely aware of it, but "what they see is what they pay". Canada cannot do this because jurisdiction over most advertising and price-posting is in the domain of the provinces under the Constitution Act, 1867. The provinces have chosen not to require prices to include the GST, similar to their provincial sales taxes. As a result, virtually all prices (except for fuel pump prices, taxi meters and a few other things) are shown "pre-GST", with the tax (or taxes) listed separately.

== See also ==
- Canada Groceries and Essentials Benefit, which replaced the GST/HST tax credit in 2026
- Digital services tax in Canada
- Sales taxes in Canada
- Taxation in Canada
- Value Added Tax (in the United Kingdom)
- Goods and services tax in other countries:
    - Australia
    - Hong Kong
    - India
    - Malaysia
    - New Zealand
    - Singapore
