= British Columbia government debt =

British Columbia government debt is composed of the financial liabilities of the Canadian provincial government of British Columbia (BC).

The total government debt (total liabilities) of British Columbia was $196.3 billion for the 2025-26 fiscal year (ending 31 March 2026). Total debt consists mainly of debt securities (e.g. government-issued marketable bonds), but includes other financial liabilities such as accounts payable. The BC government had $150.6 billion in debt securities outstanding on 31 March 2026.

British Columbia government net debt (i.e., total debt minus financial assets) was $105.5 billion at the end of the fiscal year 2025–26. Net debt per BC resident was $18,519 and net debt as a percentage of provincial GDP was 23.6 percent.

In 1991, British Columbia became the first province in Canada to pass legislation to limit the growth of government debt. Between 2000 and 2022, the province had policies to restrict debt increases, with the measures having been introduced by both major parties (the New Democratic Party and the BC Liberal Party). In 2022, the legislation to prohibit provincial government budget deficits was abolished.

== Alternative measures of BC government debt ==
The British Columbia (BC) government focuses on its debt measured as net debt (also called net liabilities). Its net debt is defined as its total debt minus its total financial assets, which consist chiefly of investments in commercial publicly-owned ("Crown") corporations, such as BC Hydro. Another measure of BC government debt, which is useful for making comparisons across jurisdictions, is debt securities issued in the market (e.g. government bonds, bills, and debentures).

	Amount (billions)
Net debt (2025-26)	$105.5
Total debt (2025-26)	$196.3
Debt securities (31 March 2026)	$150.6

== History ==
British Columbia government net debt was fairly stable from 1998 but rose after the 2008 financial crisis before stabilizing again. Government spending accelerated after 2017, and net debt per capita started to rise in 2019. British Columbia's 2026 budget projected an increase of net debt as a share of GDP from 15.0 percent in 2022-23 to 33.2 percent by 2028-29.

British Columbia government net debt, net debt per capita, and net debt as a percentage of GDP
Fiscal year	Net debt (billions)	Net debt per capita	Net debt as a percentage of GDP
1998–99	$21.9	$5,502	18.3
1999–00	$23.2	$5,777	18.4
2000–01	$23.9	$5,928	17.6
2001–02	$25.6	$6,286	18.5
2002–03	$28.6	$6,965	19.8
2003–04	$29.8	$7,222	19.6
2004–05	$28.4	$6,826	17.2
2005–06	$27.1	$6,458	15.3
2006–07	$24.5	$5,771	12.9
2007–08	$23.9	$5,565	11.9
2008–09	$26.4	$6,072	12.8
2009–10	$29.6	$6,718	15.0
2010–11	$32.2	$7,216	15.6
2011–12	$37.1	$8,247	17.0
2012–13	$36.1	$7,892	16.2
2013–14	$37.4	$8,080	16.2
2014–15	$37.8	$8,024	15.5
2015–16	$39.5	$8,292	15.8
2016–17	$38.2	$7,864	14.5
2017–18	$42.4	$8,595	15.0
2018–19	$42.9	$8,546	14.4
2019–20	$46.1	$9,026	14.9
2020–21	$54.1	$10,461	17.6
2021–22	$56.7	$10,843	15.9
2022–23	$59.9	$11,185	15.0
2023–24	$71.3	$12,920	17.2
2024–25	$87.3	$15,395	20.3
2025–26	$105.5	$18,519	23.6
2026–27*	$128.0	$22,660	27.4
2027–28*	$149.9	$26,430	30.9
2028–29*	$168.1	$29,336	33.2
*Note: Data for 2026–27 to 2028–29 are BC 2026 budget estimates. Sources: For 1998–1999 to 2021–22: "Net debt" is from the Department of Finance, Canada, Fiscal Reference Tables, 2024, Table 27: British Columbia. For 2022-23 to 2028-29: Net debt is from Table A15, Budget 2026: Budget and Fiscal Plan 2026/27 - 2028/29, British Columbia Ministry of Finance. Table definitions: Per capita net debt is calculated using the population on July 1 in the fiscal year (e.g. for 2025–26 net debt is divided by population on 1 July 2025). The fiscal year ends 31 March. Population is from Statistics Canada. Net debt as a percentage of GDP is calculated using nominal GDP for the calendar year ending in the fiscal year (e.g. for 2025–26, net debt is divided by GDP for the 2025 calendar year.) GDP is from Statistics Canada. The net debt series begins in 1998–99 since earlier data is not directly comparable, due to a break in the data following the move to comply with generally accepted accounting principles.

== Legislation to limit government debt in BC ==
As with over 100 countries around the world, and all but one U.S. state, British Columbia has used legislation to limit the growth of government debt. BC was the first province in Canada to limit the growth of government debt with its Taxpayer Protection Act in 1991. The act required a balanced budget on a cumulative basis over the succeeding five-year period, and spending growth was limited to the rate of average GDP growth over the previous five years. The law was repealed in 1992.

In 1994, a Debt Management Plan, and two successor plans, were introduced to balance the budget and limit the growth of debt. The government passed the Balanced Budget Act in 2000, arguing "equity demands that future generations of British Columbians not be burdened with an unsustainable level of debt", and that BC needed to maintain its position as a low-debt province so it would have the financial flexibility to make adequate investments in health, education, social justice, and the environment.

In 2001, a newly elected government introduced the Balanced Budget and Ministerial Accountability Act. As with the previous law, cabinet ministers would lose up to 20 percent of their annual salaries if budget targets were not met. The act was amended in 2009 to allow for two years of deficit spending, due to the fall in provincial revenues after the 2008 financial crisis.

Amid the COVID-19 pandemic in 2020, the government introduced the Economic Stabilization Act which suspended for three years the law that prohibited deficit budgets. In 2022, the balanced-budget component of the law was abolished permanently.

== Debt characteristics ==
The main source of funding for British Columbia's debt is Canadian investors. Of the province's $150.6 billion in marketable debt securities outstanding on 31 March 2026, 65 percent was held by lenders in Canada, 22 percent by lenders in the U.S., with the rest in Europe and elsewhere.

Most of B.C.'s debt is denominated in Canadian dollars. Of the outstanding market debt issued by the British Columbia government on 31 March 2026, 65 percent was issued in Canadian dollars, 22 percent in U.S. dollars, 10 percent in euros, 2 percent in Australian dollars, and 1 percent in British pounds and Swiss francs. Exchange rate risk is restricted by hedging using financial instruments. Among British Columbia's public-sector corporations, only BC Hydro carries U.S. dollar debt exposure, and this exposure is hedged through U.S. dollar revenue inflows and other financial hedges.

== See also ==
- Balanced Budget Act (Quebec)
- Canadian public debt
- Generations Fund, Quebec
- Government debt
- Ontario government debt
