= Paul Kershaw =

Paul Kershaw may refer to:

- Paul Kershaw, Canadian activist and founder of Generation Squeeze
- Paul Kershaw, a character from Coronation Street
