= Toronto government debt =

Capital debt of the municipal government of Toronto, Canada

The Toronto government debt is the amount of money the City of Toronto government has borrowed to finance capital expenditures. Under the City of Toronto Act, the Toronto government cannot run a deficit for its annual operating budget. In addition, City Council has set the limit of debt charges not to exceed 15% of the property tax revenues. As of the end of 2012, the total debt stood at CA$3.7 billion.

== Debt breakdown ==
Toronto government's debt consists of debentures or municipal bonds issued through the markets at rates advised by the "syndicate". They are purchased by institutional investors and private investors. Majority of the debt is domestic and held in Canadian currency.

== Causes of debt ==
Toronto is a rapidly growing city with a substantial amount of older infrastructure. According to the Federation of Canadian Municipalities, Toronto needs to increase its capital spending to address congestion, aging sanitation and water systems, repair backlog and other infrastructure shortcomings. CA$4.10 billion of the CA$14.84 billion Toronto's 2012-2021 Capital Budget is financed using debt. The majority of the investment will be in transportation.

== See also ==
- Budgets of the municipal government of Toronto
- Ontario government debt
