= Balanced Budget Act (Quebec) =

Canadian provincial law

The Government of Quebec adopted the Balanced Budget Act (BBA) in 1996. The BBA prohibits a budget deficit, other than in special circumstances.

== Background ==
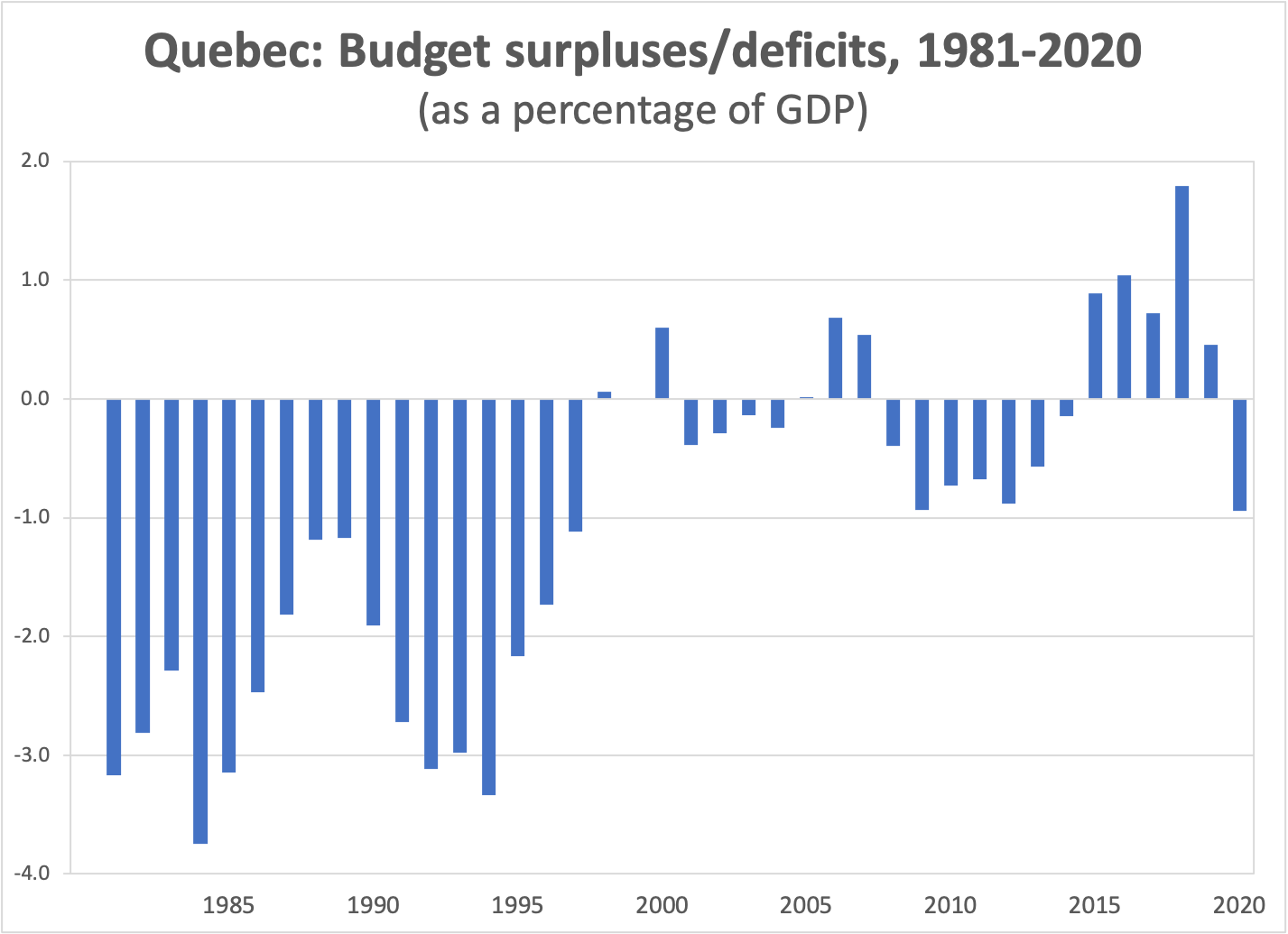
Sources: Department of Finance Canada, Fiscal Reference Tables: October 2003, Table 21; 2021, Table 22. Statistics Canada, Table 36-10-0222-01 Gross domestic product, expenditure-based, provincial and territorial, annual. Annual data correspond to the end of the fiscal year closest to December 31. For example, the year 2020 corresponds to the fiscal year ending March 31, 2021.

Quebec incurred little debt before the 1960s, but from 1958 it recorded deficits for 40 consecutive years. Accumulated debt reached more than $100 billion (over 40% of GDP) by 1998. (The debt of the province of Quebec is separate from the debt of the federal government of Canada.) Quebec's credit rating was downgraded by Moody's in 1993 and 1995 and, in 1996, there were fears of a further downgrade.

The Balanced Budget Act (BBA) was adopted unanimously by Quebec's legislative assembly in 1996, and incoming Premier Lucien Bouchard said balanced budgets were a priority "to save future generations from debt and despair" and "to protect the government's ability to act".

== The budget balance mechanism ==
Under the Balanced Budget Act (BBA), the government is prohibited from incurring a budget deficit, other than in the special circumstances of a disaster that has a major impact on revenues or expenditures; a significant deterioration in economic conditions; or any substantial reduction in federal transfer programs.

In the event of a deficit, the BBA sets out a path for a return to fiscal balance. If a deficit is less than $1 billion for a fiscal year, the government must achieve at least an equivalent surplus in the next fiscal year. For a deficit greater than $1 billion, it must be warranted by one of the specified conditions and, in the next budget, the Minister of Finance must (1) report the circumstances that justify the deficit; (2) introduce a financial plan to address the deficit within five years; (3) implement deficit reduction measures of at least $1 billion in the fiscal year of the current budget; and (4) reduce at least 75% of the deficit in the first four years.

In a surplus year, the BBA provides for the creation of a notional "stabilization reserve" to which an amount equal to the budget surplus is allocated. In a deficit year, the government incurs a budgetary deficit, within the meaning of the BBA, only if it has a budgetary balance that remains negative even after being offset by the entire balance of the (notional) stabilization reserve.

== Impact and assessment ==
Following the introduction of the BBA, and with the subsequent establishment of the Generations Fund (which targets a debt-to-GDP ratio of no more than 45%), Quebec's debt levels and credit rating improved. In the twenty-five years since its enactment, Quebec's BBA "still seems to impose a genuine constraint on the government" according to Luc Godbout. However, the BBA was temporarily suspended following the Great Recession in 2008–09, and in the midst of the COVID-19 pandemic.

Marc Levesque argues Quebec's BBA has the advantage that it allows potentially large deficits during recessions, while ultimately balancing budgets over the business cycle. That is, a deficit is allowed when tax revenue falls in a recession, in contrast to a strict balanced budget rule that would require budget balance each year. In the absence of deficit financing, when revenues decline during a downturn, a government would need to raise taxes and/or cut spending, exacerbating the drop in economic activity.

Other desirable features of Quebec's BBA are that the conditions under which a government can run a deficit are well-defined, and the time allowed to bring the budget back into balance is clearly spelled out. As a consequence, the rule is easy for governments to follow, and for the public to understand and verify.

Luc Godbout notes some adjustments would improve the BBA. For example, rather than using the fixed number of $1 billion in the legislation, it would be better to use a percent of revenue or of provincial GDP, because of the decline in the importance of $1 billion since 1996. Also, the horizon for the return to budget balance could be allowed to vary depending on the magnitude of the circumstance that caused the deficit.

== See also ==
- Canadian public debt
- Ministry of Finance (Quebec)
- Government of Quebec
- Generations Fund
