= Ministry of Finance (Quebec) =

The Ministry of Finance (in French: Ministère des Finances) is a department in the government of Quebec. Its official purpose is to "foster economic development and advise the government on financial matters," and the department's responsibilities include providing advice in budgetary, fiscal, economic, financial and accounting matters.

The department is overseen by the Quebec finance minister. As of October 2026, this office is held by Nicolas Marceau.

The Ministry of Finance administers Quebec's Balanced Budget Act, which prohibits a budget deficit, other than in special circumstances.
