= Generation Squeeze =

- Formation: Vancouver, British Columbia (2014; 12 years ago)
- Type: Non-Profit
- Purpose: Intergenerational equity, Youth engagement
- Key people: Dr. Paul Kershaw, Eric Swanson
- Website: Official

Generation Squeeze (also known as GenSqueeze) is a Canadian, non-partisan, non-profit organization that advocates on behalf of young adults. The organization claims to have modeled itself after CARP, an organization that advocates for Canadians 45 and older. Generation Squeeze stated purpose is to provide a voice for younger Canadians in the world of politics and the marketplace.

The organization has been involved in advocacy related to the issues of affordable childcare, housing, wages, transit, and government spending on youth. The organization also encourages youth involvement in politics and voting.

In May 2015, the organization co-hosted the #donthave1million rally in Vancouver. In May 2016, the group launched its Code Red housing campaign in Vancouver, calling for a government rethink of housing policy. In June 2016, the organization's founder, Paul Kershaw, was among the other housing advocates who met with Prime Minister Justin Trudeau for a roundtable discussion on the issue. In September 2016, the organization also participated in a rally held by another organization, Housing Action for Local Taxpayers (HALT), where Mr. Kershaw was a speaker.

== See also ==
- Canada Pension Plan
- Canadian public debt
- Generational accounting
- Housing shortage
- Intergenerational equity
- Ontario government debt
- Youth suffrage
