= Ontario government debt =

| Fiscal Year | Net Debt (CDN$ billions) | Deficit (−) or Surplus (CDN$ billions) |
|---|---|---|
| 2021–22 | 380.4 | 2.1 |
| 2020–21 | 373.6 | −16.4 |
| 2019–20 | 353.3 | −8.7 |
| 2018–19 | 338.5 | −7.4 |
| 2017–18 | 323.8 | −3.7 |
| 2016–17 | 314.1 | −2.4 |
| 2015–16 | 306.4 | −5.3 |
| 2014–15 | 294.6 | −11.3 |
| 2013–14 | 276.2 | −11.5 |
| 2012–13 | 259.9 | −10.7 |
| 2011–12 | 241.9 | −15.4 |
| 2010–11 | 217.8 | −17.3 |
| 2009–10 | 193.6 | −19.3 |
| 2008–09 | 169.6 | −3.0 |
| 2007–08 | 160.0 | 0.1 |
| 2006–07 | 156.6 | 1.8 |
| 2005–06 | 155.1 | −0.1 |
| 2004–05 | 142.9 | −2.0 |
| 2003–04 | 140.4 | −7.0 |
| 2002–03 | 132.7 | 0.6 |
| 2001–02 | 132.7 | −0.2 |
| 2000–01 | 132.5 | 1.9 |
| 1999–00 | 134.4 | 0.7 |
| 1998–99 | 114.7 | −2.0 |
| 1997–98 | 112.7 | −4.0 |
| 1996–97 | 108.8 | −6.9 |
| 1995–96 | 101.9 | −8.8 |
| 1994–95 | 90.7 | −10.1 |
| 1993–94 | 80.6 | −11.2 |
| 1992–93 | 61.8 | −12.4 |
| 1991–92 | 49.4 | −10.9 |
| 1990–91 | 38.4 | −3.0 |
| 1989–90 | 35.4 | 0.1 |
| 1988–89 | 35.5 | −1.5 |
| 1987–88 | 34.0 | −2.5 |
| 1986–87 | 31.5 | −2.6 |
Sources: Fiscal Reference Tables (as of November 2020); Public Accounts of Ontario (Year by Year); Ontario Financing Authority; Viable Opposition (1985–2004) – TD Bank Report

The Ontario government debt consists of the liabilities of the Government of Ontario. Approximately 82% of Ontario's debt is in the form of debt securities (bonds, Treasury bills), while other liabilities include government employee pension plan obligations, loans, and accounts payable. The Ontario Financing Authority, which manages the province's debt, says that as of March 31, 2020 (for the 2019–20 fiscal year), the Ontario government's net debt is CDN $353.3 billion. Net debt is projected to rise to $398 billion in 2020–21. The Debt-to-GDP ratio for 2019–2020 was 39.7%, and is projected to rise to 47.1% in 2020–21. Interest on the debt in 2019–20 was CDN$12.5 billion, representing 8.0% of Ontario's revenue and its fourth-largest spending area.

== Debt breakdown ==
As of March 31, 2018, the breakdown of Ontario's debt is as follows:

- Canadian Dollar Public Bonds: $259.4B (74%)
- Foreign Currency Bonds: $56.4B (16%)
- Canadian Dollar Treasury Bills: $18.9B (5%)
- Canadian Dollar Non-Public Debt: $11.4B (3%)
- US Dollar Commercial Paper: $2.6B (1%)

The majority of the debt (83.1%) was issued in Canadian currency.

== History ==
The government of Ontario's debt has risen under all governments since 1989.

During the 1990s recession, the Ontario New Democratic Party (NDP) government of Premier Bob Rae increased the total debt from $35.4 billion in 1989–1990 to $90.7 billion in 1994–1995.

Under the Progressive Conservative government of Premier Mike Harris the debt increased from $90.7 billion in 1994–1995 to $132.7 billion in 2002–2003, even while cutting services and downloading formerly provincially-run services onto the municipalities. In the same period, the federal Liberal government cut $7 billion total in transfers to all of the provinces. Following this, during the Harris government period, the federal government restored and actually increased support for the provinces.

The Liberal government of Premier Dalton McGuinty, increased spending on social and energy programs and uploaded services from the municipalities, doubling the total debt from $132.7 billion in 2002–2003 to $276.2 billion in 2013–2014.

The Liberal government of Premier Kathleen Wynne, in part through the sale of Hydro One shares, projected a $600-million surplus in 2017–2018 but instead posted a 3.7 billion dollar deficit.

Change of Accounting Method for Government Assets

According to The Star, a 27-page "scathing" pre-election April 2018 report by Bonnie Lysyk, the Auditor General of Ontario, which was submitted to the Ontario Legislature, said that the accounting methods used by Wynne's liberal government were "lawful" but not "right". AG Lysyk has issued opinions that the government was understating the deficit by several billion dollars, because it was not following Canadian Public Sector Accounting Standards. She was referring to about $11 billion in the government jointly sponsored pension plans (JSPPs)—Ontario Public Service Employees' Union Pension Plan and the Ontario Teachers' Pension Plan—that Wynne's government "counted toward the bottom line". Based on Lysyk's revised accounting methods, these funds are not revenue which dramatically increases the annual debt. Using these revised accounting methods, Lysyk "calculated that the deficit forecast for [2019] is $12.2 billion—not the $6.6 billion Finance Minister Sousa had predicted." For 2020–21 it would be "$12.5 billion, not $6.5 billion." She said "More money will need to be borrowed to pay for the unrecorded expenses even when the government reports an annual surplus or a balanced budget. The government's claim of a surplus was not reflected in any way in the amount of the debt.

The Independent Financial Commission of Inquiry August 30, 2018, report was tabled to "establish a budgetary baseline" and to clarify Canadian Public Sector Accounting Standards requirements that the Ontario government must follow for the Auditor General of Ontario reports. The Commission recommended revising the Public Accounts of Ontario 2017–2018 to comply with the Auditor General's "accounting treatment for any net pension assets of the Ontario Teachers' Pension Plan and Ontario Public Service Employees' Union Pension Plan on a provisional basis", which would include "restatement of the prior year's figures for comparative purposes." The 2018 Budget had forecast a deficit that was 2.9 percentage points lower than the October report. The Commission recommended that the government revise the "accounting treatment for global adjustment refinancing and jointly sponsored pension plans (JSPPs) ... [retroactively] from 2001–02 onwards" which added a "cumulative $14.6 billion to net debt." This represents a revised net debt-to-GDP ratio up from 40.5% to 40.8%.

The Star reported on December 5, 2018, that Cindy Veinot, who was then Ontario's provincial controller, disagreed with Minister Fedeli's $15 billion deficit figure and the "accounting decisions made by the Ford government". Veinot said that, "I believe that the consolidated financial statements of the province of Ontario as issued ... materially overstate the deficit of the province for the year. Veinot resigned in September 2018, "because she refused to sign off on Finance Minister Vic Fedeli's inflated $15 billion deficit", according to The Star. The Star described Veinot, as a "leading expert on pension accounting who finished first among 63,000 candidates in the 1998 certified public accountants exam in the U.S. Veinot contended that the government jointly sponsored pension plans (JSPPs) "holdings are an asset." Until 2015, Auditor General Lysyk and her predecessors considered the JSPPs holdings to be an asset but in 2015, she changed her mind. The previous Liberal government also held that the JSPPs were an asset but Ford's new government administration disagreed.

Table from Commission report
| (billions) | Budget plan 2018-9 | Revised baseline | Impact on deficit |
|---|---|---|---|
| Revenue | 152.5 | 150.9 | (1.5) |
| Total expenses | 158.5 | 164.9 | (6.4) |
| Surplus (Deficit) Before Reserve | (6.0) | (14.0) | (8.0) |
| Reserve | 0.7 | 1.0 | (0.3) |
| Surplus / (Deficit) | (6.7) | (15.0) | (8.3) |

According to an April 11, 2019, Royal Bank of Canada (RBC) report, the revised estimate of Ontario's deficit was $11.7 billion in 2018–2019 and it was projected to decrease by $1.4 billion in 2019–2020 mainly because of "the removal of the $1 billion contingency reserve." At that time it was projected that the deficit would be "completely eliminated in 2023–2024 with a small surplus of $0.3 billion."

By June 2018, Ontario had "Canada's second-highest public debt per person and a growing budget deficit", according to The Economist.

The Ontario Finance Department reported in October 2018, that Ontario's public debt per person at $23,014, had surpassed that of Quebec at $21,606 in the fiscal year 2017–2018. Newfoundland and Labrador public debt per capita at $27,761, was the highest in Canada.

The RBC said in April 2019, that the Ford government's debt target is soft, aiming to reduce the net debt-to-GDP ratio to "less than the inherited 40.8%" in the early years to "38.6% by 2023–2024."

By 2019, the Ontario Chamber of Commerce reported that Ontario's debt was over $348 billion—representing about 41% of provincial GDP of almost $850 billion. Ontario's GDP is much larger than any of the other provinces and is almost half of Canada's GDP. "When combined with the federal debt (approximately $680 billion), the debt-to-GDP ratio for Ontarians nears 80 percent."

A September 21, 2018, review said that the 2017–18 deficit was $3.7 billion.

By way of contrast, the 2018–2019 deficit was eventually $7.4 billion, higher than the outgoing Wynne Government's projection but much lower than the incoming Ford government's $15 billion estimate in August 2018.

The Ford government subsequently ran a budget deficit of $8.7 billion during the 2019–2020 fiscal year. Due to record spending during the COVID-19 pandemic, the Ontario government's budget for 2020-2021 is set for $38.5 billion, setting a new record and plotting no path to balance. It was reported in late 2020 that the Ford government was sitting on $12B of unspent COVID-19 contingency funding as the second wave hit, some of which was provided by the Federal government.

== Causes of debt ==
Health and education together account for more than 50% of Ontario's spending ($61.3B and $29.1B, respectively).

Tax cuts and incentives to high income earners during the 1990s reduced government revenues.

The Great Recession of 2008 had a considerable impact on Ontario, particularly its manufacturing sector. Ontario's budget surplus in 2007–2008 had by 2009–2010 given way to a $19 billion deficit.

Ontario government's direct subsidies to corporations average $2.7 billion per year over the five years to 2011. It has been argued that business subsidies such as to the Ontario's automotive sector does not help create widespread economic growth or new jobs and instead contributes to increased debt.

== Risks and consequences ==
In 2012, Moody's Investors Service downgraded Ontario's rating from Aa1 to Aa2, citing "growing debt burden" as a major concern. In April 2018, the agency changed its outlook on this rating from "stable" to "negative," stating its expectation that "spending pressure will challenge the province's ability to sustain balanced fiscal results across multiple years."

In 2012, the Provincial Solvency and Federal Obligations study found that Ontario had a 42.9% probability of defaulting on its debt obligations in the following 10-20 years (higher than any other province) and a 79.3% probability of defaulting in the following 30 years.

== Debt reduction ==
In 2012, the governing Liberal Party commissioned the Drummond Report, which outlined various measures to reduce the province's debt level.

Debt reduction was proposed by all three major provincial parties in their 2014 election platforms. The Progressive Conservative Party proposed to eliminate the deficit and reduce debt through eliminating 100,000 public sector jobs, a public sector wage freeze and benefit reduction, and service cuts to all programs except healthcare. The New Democratic Party proposed to balance the budget by eliminating corporate tax "giveaways" and through the Fairness Tax on Ontario's highest income earners. The Liberal Party proposed to balance the budget by 2017–2018 by establishing a committee of ministers to find $2.25B in savings over 3 years and reduce the number of government agencies by 30%.

Non-governmental organizations in other Provinces such as the Fraser Institute and the Canadian Taxpayers Federation have advocated for aggressive debt reduction through spending cuts. Organizations such as the Canadian Centre for Policy Alternatives have advocated for strong stimulus programs such as infrastructure spending to aid economic recovery and growth during the Great Recession. They also advocate eliminating corporate subsidies, tax loopholes and cuts.

== See also ==
- British Columbia Government Debt
- Economy of Ontario
- Generation Squeeze
- Government of Ontario
- Canadian public debt
