= Generations Fund =

Fund created by the Quebec government to reduce public debt

The Generations Fund is a fund created by the government of Quebec to reduce public debt and, in so doing, mitigate the intergenerational transfer of the debt burden. Enacted in 2006, the Act to reduce the debt and establish the Generations Fund targets a debt-to-GDP ratio of no more than 45% by fiscal year 2025-26.

== Background ==
Quebec incurred little debt before the 1960s, but from 1958 it recorded deficits for 40 consecutive years.

When the Generations Fund was created in 2006, Quebec's debt-to-GDP ratio was 42.7%, compared with the Canadian provincial government average of 25%. (Quebec's debt concept used was total debt, which was subsequently replaced by gross debt.) Interest on the debt was Quebec's third largest spending item after health and education, and represented 12.7 cents of each dollar of budgetary revenue.

== Operation ==
The Generations Fund is dedicated exclusively to repaying Quebec's debt. The act establishing the Fund sets out a precise debt target – by fiscal year 2025-26 gross debt is not to exceed 45% of GDP. As of 31 March 2021, Quebec's gross debt was $210.1 billion, or 46.8% as a percentage of GDP. (Gross debt corresponds to the debt contracted on financial markets, plus the net liability for the pension plans and other future benefits of public and para-public sector employees, minus the balance of the Generations Fund.)

At the time the Generations Fund was created, it was difficult for the government to increase taxes. Instead, alternative sources of revenue were chosen that are allocated exclusively to the Fund. The Fund's main revenue source is water-power royalties paid by Hydro-Québec and private producers of hydroelectricity. Other revenue sources are mining revenues, the specific tax on alcoholic beverages, and investment income generated by the Fund itself.

The book value of the Generations Fund was $12.2 billion on 31 March 2021. The Generations Fund made debt repayments of $1 billion in fiscal year 2013-14, $8 billion in 2018-19 and $2 billion in 2019-20.

Sums allocated to the Generations Fund are managed by the Caisse de dépôt et placement du Québec in accordance with an investment policy determined by the Minister of Finance in collaboration with the Caisse.

== Impact and assessment ==
In 2018, then Quebec Premier Philippe Couillard credited the province's fiscal turnaround to the Generations Fund. TD Bank economist Rishi Sondhi says the Fund provides a testament to the Quebec government's priority to lower its debt burden.

Quebec's debt levels and credit rating improved following the introduction of the Generations Fund, along with the Balanced Budget Act of 1996, says University of Sherbrooke economist Luc Godbout. Former Vice-President and Chief Economist with the Public Sector Pension Investment Board, Marc Lévesque, notes that the 45% debt-to-GDP target is easy for the public to understand, and compliance is straightforward to verify.

A criticism of the Generations Fund is that it acts as a "smokescreen" that merely obscures the budget's bottom line. According to Alexandre Laurin of the C.D. Howe Institute, while the objective to repay public debt is laudable, the only way to do this is to produce budget surpluses. The Quebec government's practice of treating a payment to the Generations Fund as an expense, rather than an investment "makes sense only for political marketing."

Globe and Mail columnist Barrie McKenna says that by directing revenues into the Generations Fund and investing the profits "Quebec is essentially issuing more debt than it really needs and taking on the risk of market corrections along the way." Hence, the investment returns of the fund should be viewed as compensation to taxpayers for bearing investment risk.
