= Canadian public debt =

Debt owed by the government sector in Canada

Canadian public debt, or general government debt, comprises the liabilities of the government sector in Canada. Government debt consists mainly of Treasury bonds, but also includes other liabilities such as public service employee pensions. Changes in debt arise primarily from new borrowing, due to government expenditures exceeding revenues.

The market value of government gross debt was $3,385 billion ($81,423 per capita) for the consolidated Canadian general government – federal (central), plus provincial, territorial and local governments – in the fiscal year 2024/25 (which ended 31 March 2025). As a ratio of GDP, gross debt was 109% in 2024/25, down from 130% in 2020/21, but above the pre-COVID-19 pandemic level of 106% in 2019/20. General government net debt, defined as gross debt minus financial assets, reached $1,605 billion (51.6% as a share of GDP) in 2024/25. Federal (central) government net debt for the first time surpassed one trillion dollars in 2024/25, at $1,062 billion (equivalent to 34.2% of GDP).

A substantial share of Canadian government debt securities are issued by provincial, territorial, and local governments (PTLGs), as Canada is one of the world's most decentralized federations. Of the $2,520 billion of Canadian general government debt securities in the market in 2024, $1,126 billion was issued by PTLGs compared to $1,452 billion issued by the federal government.

A 2024 Parliamentary Budget Officer report assessed as "sustainable" over the long term the financial policies of the federal government and five provinces: Ontario, Quebec, Alberta, Saskatchewan, and Nova Scotia. Public debt is sustainable when it does not grow continuously as a share of the economy in the absence of permanent tax increases and/or spending reductions.

== Alternative measures of government debt ==
Commonly used descriptors of government debt are gross debt, net debt, and debt securities liabilities. These measures are often presented as a share of GDP, as in the table below, to gauge the size of debt relative to the size of the economy. The debt-to-GDP ratio is a key indicator of the sustainability of government finances, according to the OECD.

Gross debt, also called "total debt", consists of all liabilities that require payment of principal or interest at some point in the future, and includes debt securities, loans, pension schemes, and other accounts payable. Gross debt is the commonly-used measure of debt in international comparisons by the IMF and the OECD.

Net Debt is gross debt minus financial assets. It takes into account the financial assets governments hold, such as investments to cover the liabilities associated with civil servant (government employee) pension plans. An issue with calculating net debt is that some government assets are difficult to value (for example, nonmarketable equity investments, and loans that might never be repaid if the loan recipients become insolvent). Another issue with net debt is the assets to be included. The Department of Finance's method of calculating net debt has been criticized for including the assets (but not the liabilities) of the Canada Pension Plan (CPP) and Quebec Pension Plan (QPP). This may cause an understatement of net debt since CPP and QPP assets are set aside to pay for future public retirement plan benefits, so they are not available to also pay down government debt.

Debt securities liabilities are liabilities in the form of debt securities (chiefly bonds and bills). Government debt securities provide a useful measure of government debt as they are a large share of government liabilities (74.4% in 2024/25) and are relatively straightforward to measure. By contrast, another major debt component, government employee pension plan liabilities, are less easy to value as they depend on employee longevity and future pension plan investment returns.

Debt securities can be valued at market value or at book value (also called the "nominal value"). The value of a debt security measured at market prices is most relevant for a purchaser (price varies with changes in market yields). However, the book value is more relevant for the government issuing the security because the book value indicates the amount owed to the creditor. In 2024, the book value of debt securities liabilities for the consolidated Canadian general government was about 2.8% higher than the market value ($2,591 billion at book value vs. $2,520 billion at market value).

Government Debt for Fiscal Year 2024/2025
| | Amount ($billions) | Percent of GDP |
|---|---|---|
| Consolidated general government: | | |
| Gross debt | $3,385 | 108.9% |
| Net debt | $1,605 | 51.6% |
| Debt securities liabilities | $2,520 | 81.1% |
| Federal government: | | |
| Gross debt | $1,864 | 60.0% |
| Net debt | $1,062 | 34.2% |
| Debt securities liabilities | $1,453 | 46.7% |
Notes: The consolidated general government includes all federal (central), provincial, territorial and local governments. Debt is measured at market value. Data are for 2024, which corresponds to the fiscal year 2024/25 (ending 31 March 2025). Sources: Statistics Canada Tables 10-10-0147-01, 10-10-0016-01, and 36-10-0222-01. GDP in 2024 was $3,109 billion.

Public accounts vs. national accounts measures of debt The Department of Finance provides measures of federal and provincial debt on a public accounts basis, using reports from individual governments. An advantage of public accounts numbers is that they can provide detail on government expenditures. However, they are not strictly comparable across jurisdictions. By contrast, debt measured on a national accounts basis (employed in the table above) follows an internationally agreed standard, in order to facilitate comparisons across countries and provinces. According to the Department of Finance, the divergence between public accounts and national accounts measures arise from differences in the universe covered by each accounting system, differences in the accounting treatments of various transactions such as capital gains, methodological differences, and timing adjustments.

== Historical context ==
Overview During the Great Depression, the Canadian consolidated general government gross debt as a share of GDP exceeded 100%. It reached 150% following World War II. The ratio fell until the 1970s, then rose to over 100% in the mid-1990s. The federal government's gross debt to GDP ratio fell from the mid-1990s, before rising briefly following the 2008 financial crisis. It then resumed a downward trend until the pandemic-related spike in 2020. By contrast, provincial government gross debt as a share of GDP has increased fairly steadily since the 1960s.

Government bond issues soared in 2020 to finance COVID-19 pandemic related spending, as shown in the figure below. As a consequence, by 2020, the ratio of all government debt securities liabilities to GDP jumped to 96%, surpassing the 1995 peak of 94%.

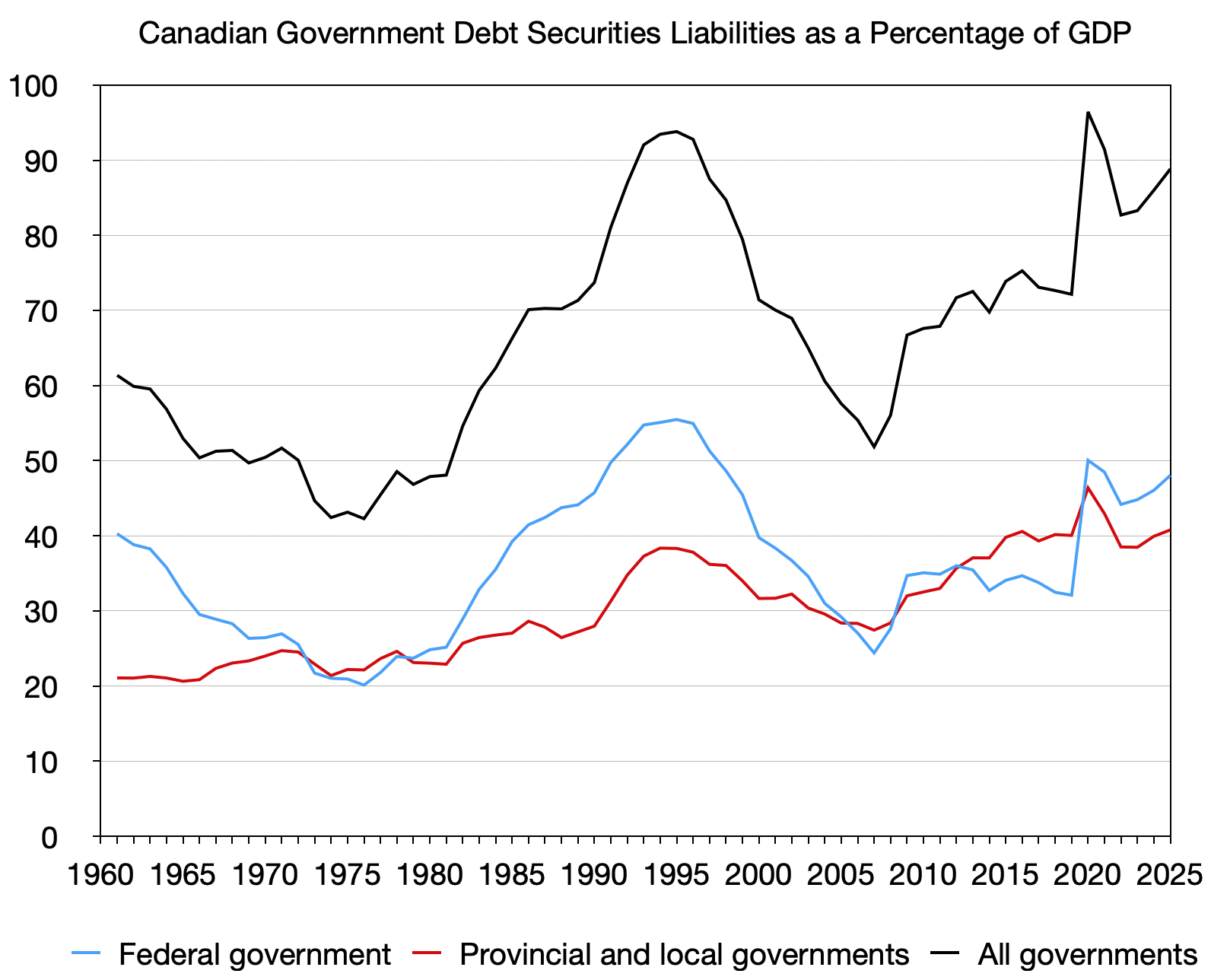
Sources: Debt securities liabilities (book value) for the "Federal general government" and "Other levels of general government" are from Statistics Canada Table 36-10-0580-01 National Balance Sheet Accounts, fourth quarter (2012 to 2025); and Table 36-10-0534-01 National balance sheet, provincial and local governments, annual, 1961-2011: "Short-term paper" plus "Bonds". GDP is from Table 36-10-0699-01 Gross domestic product, expenditure-based (1981-2025); and from Table 36-10-0104-01 Gross domestic product at market prices (1961-1980).

The Fiscal consolidation of the 1990s Successive years of federal budget deficits in the 1980s and early 1990s, and a rising debt to GDP ratio, led to concerns about debt sustainability. The federal government's deficit reached 8% measured as a share of GDP in 1983 and 1984, and from 1985 to 1990 Canada's public debt increased sharply from $USD166 billion to $USD290 billion with compounding interest accounting for more than 80% of the increase. In 1990, then Prime Minister Brian Mulroney introduced a budget that included a two-year freeze on health care and post-secondary education transfers to the provinces, the elimination of cash grants to businesses, and a 5% cap on spending increases for foreign aid and the military. Plans to privatize Petro-Canada were also announced, and a continuation of the privatization program that began in the 1980s which included sales of 23 of Canada's 61 crown corporations, including Air Canada, De Havilland Aircraft of Canada, Canadian Arsenals, and Connaught Laboratories. These measures were expected to decrease the federal deficit from $USD25.3 billion to $USD8.3 billion by 1995.

An editorial in The Wall Street Journal in 1995 said Canada might need an International Monetary Fund bailout and called Canada "an honorary member of the Third World." When Jean Chretien became Prime Minister in November 1993, he undertook a fiscal consolidation that was achieved mainly by big spending reductions. The ratio of spending cuts to tax hikes was seven-to-one. Tax revenues could not be boosted by much, partly because Canada's top marginal income tax rate was already around 55%. The policy shift represented "the biggest reduction in Canadian government spending since demobilization after World War Two." By the fiscal year 1995/96 the federal net debt to GDP ratio peaked at 68%, and a budget surplus was achieved within four years.

The 2008 financial crisis and the COVID-19 Pandemic During the period that included the 2008 financial crisis and the Great Recession, Stephen Harper's government reported six straight years of budget deficits, and the federal government's debt increased. The net debt-to-GDP ratio rose to 33% in 2013, and then began a slight decline.

In 2020, the first year of the COVID-19 pandemic, gross debt reached an unprecedented $2,852 billion, or 129.2% as a ratio of GDP. That year the consolidated general government (federal, provincial, territorial and local governments) posted an historic deficit of $325.5 billion. Issuances of government financial instruments in 2020Q2 reached record highs, including $234.4 billion in federal short term paper, and $65.7 billion in federal bonds, plus $62 billion at the subnational level (mostly provincial government bonds).

During the COVID-19 pandemic, interest rates were at an historic low which meant that the massive deficit spending was easier to finance. Interest paid on debt represented approximately 1% of GDP early in the pandemic, compared to 6% in 1995. For the 2021/22 fiscal year, interest expense on government debt liabilities was $64.6 billion, or 6.8% of every dollar of revenue. Higher debt refinancing interest rates and greater government gross debt meant that, by the 2024/25 fiscal year, consolidated general government interest expense rose to $102.4 billion ($50.1 billion at the federal level, and $52.5 billion for provincial, territorial and local governments). Interest expense was 9% measured as a share of total government revenue, and 3.3% as a share of GDP.

== Public debt of Canadian provinces, territories, and local governments ==
The total financial liabilities or gross debt of the Canadian consolidated provincial, territorial and local governments was $1,608 billion in the 2024/25 fiscal year (ending 31 March 2025), as shown in the table below. This amount is 51.7% measured as a percentage of GDP, and is a substantial proportion of the $3,385 billion total public debt obligations of Canadians.

The outstanding debt securities issued by the provincial, territorial, and local governments, at 36.2% as a percentage of GDP, is significant but smaller in size than the federal government's 46.7%. Debt securities provide a useful measure of debt because they comprise the largest component of gross debt and are relatively straightforward to measure. (Another major component of gross debt, government employee pension plan liabilities, is more difficult to measure as it varies with a plan's investment returns and member longevity, for example.)

The value of provincial outstanding debt securities liabilities expressed as a percentage of GDP was the lowest for Alberta (21.5%) and the highest for Manitoba (64.4%) in 2024/25.

Government Gross Debt and Debt Securities for Fiscal Year 2024/25
| | Gross debt ($billions) | Gross debt as a percent of GDP | Debt securities ($billions) | Debt securities as a percent of GDP |
|---|---|---|---|---|
| British Columbia | $172.8 | 40.3% | $130.3 | 30.4% |
| Alberta | 34.3 | 30.3% | $102.0 | 21.5% |
| Saskatchewan | $49.3 | 43.7% | $33.6 | 29.8% |
| Manitoba | $79.8 | 83.0% | $61.9 | 64.4% |
| Ontario | $580.5 | 48.5% | $460.2 | 38.4% |
| Quebec | $512.3 | 83.1% | $296.6 | 48.1% |
| New Brunswick | $28.7 | 59.4% | $22.4 | 46.4% |
| Nova Scotia | $26.0 | 39.8% | $17.5 | 26.8% |
| Prince Edward Island | $4.9 | 45.0% | $3.7 | 34.0% |
| Newfoundland and Labrador | $29.6 | 70.1% | $20.9 | 49.5% |
| Consolidated provincial-territorial and local governments | $1,607.7 | 51.7% | $1,126.1 | 36.2% |
| Federal government | $1,864.2 | 60.0% | $1,452.8 | 46.7% |
| Consolidated Canadian general government | $3,385.2 | 108.9% | $2,520.0 | 81.1% |
Notes: Data are for the fiscal year 2024/25 (the fiscal year ending 31 March 2025). The consolidated general government includes all federal (central), provincial, territorial, and local governments. Debt is measured at market value. Sources: Statistics Canada Tables 10-10-0147-01, 10-10-0016-01 and 36-10-0222-01. Data for the provincial governments are consolidated. Consolidation is a method used to present one overarching statistic for a province that eliminates all transactions and debtor-creditor relationships among different government units within a province. These units include the provincial government, health and social service institutions, universities and colleges, municipalities and other local public administrations, and school boards. Consolidated data can be compared across provinces because consolidation takes into account differences in provincial administrative structures and government service delivery. Consolidated data for the Canadian general government combines federal government data with provincial, territorial, and local governments, but excludes data for the Canada Pension Plan and Quebec Pension Plan.

== Debt held by foreign investors ==
In 1960, 4% of the Canadian government debt was held by foreign investors. Non-resident investors held 35% of Government of Canada securities in 2024/25. The Department of Finance described this as "in line with the average share for G7 countries." The share of foreign-resident holdings has been relatively stable since 2015-16.

== Risk factors: interest rates and economic growth ==
Major risk factors that can increase government debt include slowing economic growth and rising interest rates.

Rising interest rates increase public debt charges, raising government expenditures. From 2011 to 2021, falling interest rates meant that, while public debt rose, public debt charges decreased from $29 billion to $24 billion. The average interest rate paid on the federal debt was 4.6% in the fiscal year 2007/08, and in 2020/21 it was 1.4%. Rates at that time were by far the lowest in the post-war period. By 2024/25, consolidated general government interest expenses reached $102.4 billion ($50.1 billion for the federal government, and $52.5 billion for the provincial, territorial and local governments), due to higher debt refinancing interest rates and higher government gross debt. Measured as a share of total government revenue, the consolidated general government interest expense in 2024/25 was 9%.

Slow economic growth is a risk factor since it means government tax revenue grows less quickly. Further, slower growth of GDP relative to growth of debt increases the ratio of debt to GDP.

== Debt comparison with other countries ==
The level of government responsible for government programs differs across countries. For this reason, international fiscal comparisons are usually made on a total government, national accounts basis. For Canada, total government includes the federal (central), provincial/territorial, and local governments. Another reason to measure debt on a total government basis is that the federal government may be viewed as responsible for the debt of other levels of government. Credit rating agency Fitch said it expects the federal government to provide a province with access to debt markets, as it did early in the coronavirus pandemic. When Newfoundland needed debt repayment assistance in March 2020, it appealed to the federal government. Any aid delivered to one province would reduce the resources the federal government has available for its own debt repayment responsibilities, and to support debt repayment in other provinces.

The International Monetary Fund (IMF) reports that in 2024 Canada's net and gross debt-to-GDP ratios were 11% and 110%, respectively. Canada's general government holds sizeable financial assets (approximately 99% measured as a percentage of GDP at market value at end-2024), with around 30% invested in equity shares, of which more than half relate to pension fund investments. Financial assets rose sharply during the COVID-19 pandemic (to 81% of GDP in 2021 from 64% in 2019), spurred by support measures such as loans to businesses and tax deferrals (accounts receivable). Canada's general government gross debt includes substantial accounts payable (around 18% of GDP at end-2024), which many advanced countries do not report. In net debt calculations, most advanced economies remove accounts payable and receivable, as well as equity holdings, but Canada includes equity assets, and both accounts payable and receivable. The IMF's general government gross debt calculation excludes unfunded pension liabilities, to maintain comparability with other countries.

The general government gross debt-to-GDP ratio for countries the IMF classifies as Advanced economies that have a population of at least 5 million is shown in the table below. In 2025, Canada had the third lowest level of gross public debt as a percent of GDP among the G7 countries – lower than Japan, Italy, the United States, and France, but higher than Germany, and the United Kingdom.

General Government Gross Debt, Percent of GDP
| | 2024 | 2025 |
|---|---|---|
| Japan | 214 | 207 |
| Singapore | 166 | 171 |
| Greece | 155 | 146 |
| Italy | 135 | 137 |
| United States | 122 | 124 |
| France | 113 | 116 |
| Canada | 110 | 114 |
| Belgium | 104 | 106 |
| United Kingdom | 100 | 102 |
| Spain | 102 | 100 |
| Portugal | 93 | 90 |
| Finland | 82 | 89 |
| Austria | 79 | 80 |
| Israel | 68 | 69 |
| Germany | 62 | 63 |
| Slovak Republic | 60 | 62 |
| New Zealand | 51 | 55 |
| Korea | 50 | 52 |
| Australia | 51 | 51 |
| Norway | 53 | 45 |
| Czech Republic | 43 | 45 |
| Netherlands | 44 | 43 |
| Switzerland | 40 | 39 |
| Sweden | 34 | 35 |
| Ireland | 38 | 33 |
| Denmark | 31 | 28 |
| Bulgaria | 24 | 27 |
Source: World Economic Outlook Database, International Monetary Fund (IMF), April 2026. Numbers are IMF staff estimates in 2025 for Japan, Greece, France, Canada, Belgium, Portugal, Finland, Austria, Slovak Republic, Korea, Australia, Norway, Czech Republic, Netherlands, Sweden, Ireland, and Denmark.

== Public debt sustainability ==
A 2024 report by the Parliamentary Budget Officer (PBO) said that the current fiscal policy of the federal government, and the provinces of Quebec, Saskatchewan, Nova Scotia, Ontario, and Alberta, were sustainable over the long-term. This was not the case for the remaining provincial and territorial governments. A province with an unsustainable fiscal trajectory must eventually introduce permanent tax increases and/or spending reductions in order to keep its net debt-to-GDP ratio below its initial level over a 75-year projection horizon.

The PBO identified the main driver of government debt as a demographic shift, as the older population transitions into retirement and the workforce growth slows. The aging population will also raise financial pressure on provincial programs such as healthcare and public pensions.

=== Credit ratings ===
As of 2025, Canada maintained its AAA sovereign credit rating from S&P, Moody's, and Morningstar DBRS. Fitch downgraded its credit rating for Canada from AAA to AA+ in June 2020, following a period of record deficits during the COVID-19 pandemic.

A credit rating provides an indication of the sustainability of a government's debt, as it shows the rating agency's view of the ability of a borrower to meet its financial commitments. Credit rating agency reports on Canada's credit strength are used by investors—including sovereign wealth and pension funds. A credit rating may affect borrowing costs.

== See also ==
- British Columbia Government Debt
- Canadian federal budget
- Taxation in Canada
- Economy of Canada
- Ontario debt
- Debt-to-GDP ratio

General:

- Government debt
- Government budget deficit

International:

- List of sovereign states by public debt
