= Premiership of Stephen Harper =

Period of the Government of Canada from 2006 to 2015

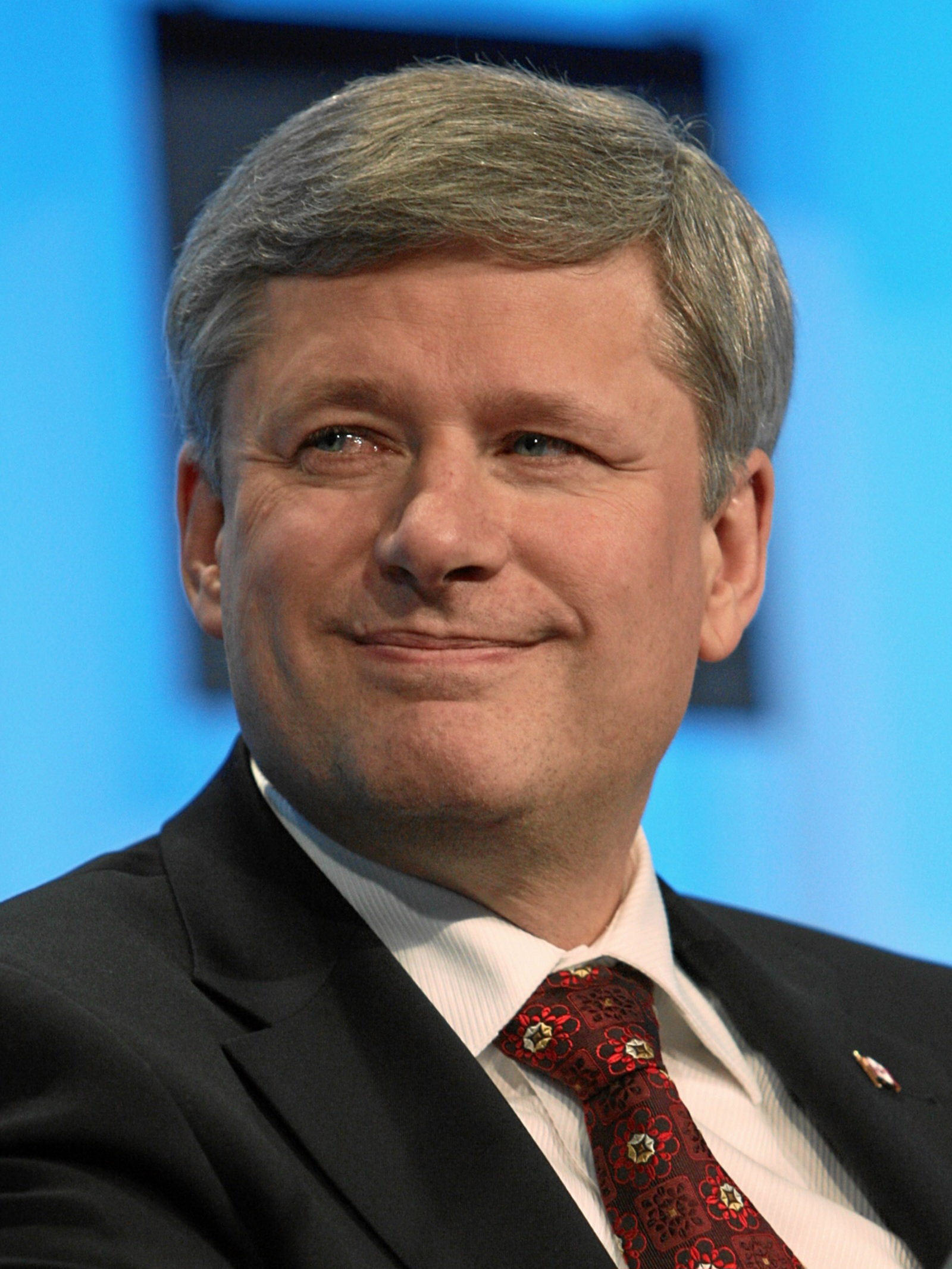
- Harper in 2010
- Premiership of Stephen Harper; February 6, 2006 – November 4, 2015
- Monarch: Elizabeth II
- Prime Minister: Stephen Harper
- Cabinet: 28th Canadian Ministry
- Party: Conservative
- Election: 2006; 2008; 2011
- Appointed by: Michaëlle Jean
- Seat: Office of the Prime Minister
- Constituency: Calgary Southwest

The premiership of Stephen Harper began on February 6, 2006, when the first Cabinet headed by Stephen Harper was sworn in by Governor General Michaelle Jean. Harper was invited to form the 28th Canadian Ministry and become Prime Minister of Canada following the 2006 federal election, where Harper led his Conservative Party to win a plurality of seats in the House of Commons of Canada, defeating the Liberal minority government of Prime Minister Paul Martin. Harper led his Conservatives to win a more significant minority government in 2008, and then a majority government in 2011. In the 2015 federal election, Harper's Conservatives lost power to the Liberal Party led by Justin Trudeau. On November 4, 2015, Harper resigned as prime minister and was succeeded by Trudeau, who formed a majority government.

== Background ==
From Canadian Confederation until the 1993 election, the Liberal Party's control has been the rule of who was in power in Canada, with short-lived Conservative governments to break up their long stretches of governance. Stephen Harper, then a member of Parliament, and political scientist Tom Flanagan described this as "a benign dictatorship, not under a strict one-party rule, but under a one-party-plus system beset by the factionalism, regionalism and cronyism that accompany any such system". In 1993, the Progressive Conservatives were reduced from a majority government to fifth place and two seats in the House of Commons. They were displaced by the Reform Party of Canada in Western Canada, the Bloc Québécois in Québec, and the Liberals throughout the country due to vote splitting.

Harper was elected in 1993 as a Reform MP. He resigned before the 1997 election and became an advocate of the Unite the Right movement, which argued for a merger of the Progressive Conservative and Reform Parties. Harper went on to win the leadership of the Canadian Alliance (the successor party to the Reform Party) in 2002. In 2003, Harper and Progressive Conservative leader Peter MacKay agreed to merge their parties into the new Conservative Party of Canada. Harper was elected leader of the new party in 2004.

In the 2004 election, the Liberals were reduced to a minority government due to a government spending scandal and the success of the newly united right-of-centre opposition party. Harper went on to lead the Conservatives to win a plurality of seats in the 2006 election and formed the smallest minority government in Canadian history.

== History ==
Harper led the government through the longest-lasting federal minority government in Canadian history, which ended when he achieved a majority victory in 2011.

=== 39th Parliament ===
The Conservatives won 124 (or 40.3% of the total) seats in the House of Commons of Canada in the 2006 election for the 39th Parliament of Canada while receiving 36.3% of the popular vote.

It was one of the Harper government's priorities to mandate fixed election dates by amending the Canada Elections Act. This was accomplished by Bill C-16 in May 2007.

The Conflict of Interest Act was another one of Harper's priorities, passing into law in 2007.

=== 40th Parliament ===
They won 143 seats (or 46.4% of the total) in the 2008 election for the 40th Parliament of Canada while receiving 37.7% of the popular vote.

=== 41st Parliament ===
In the 2011 election for the 41st Parliament of Canada, the Conservatives won 166 seats (54% of the total) with 39.6% of the popular vote.

Conventional wisdom before the 2011 election previously held that winning a federal majority without significant support in the province of Quebec would be near impossible. The Conservatives disproved this, winning an eleven-seat majority with only five seats in Quebec. The Conservatives won considerably more popular support outside of Quebec than they did elsewhere, carrying 48% of the popular vote outside of Quebec. This was only the second time in Canadian history that a federal government was formed without a substantial number of seats from Quebec.

Media speculation was the Conservatives would need to win more than 40% of the popular vote to form a majority government, the stated goal of Harper in the 2011 election. However, the Liberal Party was able to win a majority with only 38.5% of the popular vote in 1997. The Conservatives have previously come very close to a majority with 37.7% of the popular vote (12 seats short) in 2008 and with 35.9% of the vote (6 seats short) in 1979.

=== Opinion polling between the 2006 and 2008 federal elections ===
From December 2006 to August 2008, the Conservatives and Liberals exchanged leads in opinion polls. From September through the election in October 2008, the Conservatives led in all polls.

=== Opinion polling between the 2008 and 2011 federal elections ===
The Conservatives led in every public opinion poll released from March 2010 to the election. From January to September 2009 and again from January to February 2010 several polls showed the Liberals tied with or slightly leading Harper's Conservatives.

=== Opinion polling after the 2011 federal election ===
The Conservatives continued to maintain 37–39% support after the election. In March 2012, some polls showed the NDP tied with or surpassing the Conservatives and others showed the Conservatives with a slim lead. In May 2012, the Tories dipped into second place behind the NDP, but the NDP quickly dropped again. In April 2013, the Conservatives dropped in second place in the polls behind the Liberals and their new leader Justin Trudeau. The Liberals would keep their lead until 2015. Upon the beginning of the election campaign in the summer of 2015, the three main federal parties were neck and neck with about 30% each in most polls. The Liberals ended up edging out the other parties during the campaign and won the 2015 Canadian federal election.

== Relationship with parliament, opposition parties ==
For most of Harper's tenure as prime minister, he led a minority government meaning he relied on the support (or abstention) of other parties to maintain the confidence of the House of Commons. The Harper government often relied on the official opposition Liberal caucus abstaining in whole or in part to allow confidence measures to pass. The government lost its first confidence vote on a Liberal-sponsored censure motion on March 25, 2011, prompting Harper to seek dissolution and the calling of the 2011 general election.

=== Confidence in the House of Commons ===
The principal motions of confidence in the Canadian House of Commons are matters of supply (motions and bills concerning the budget and spending government monies) and the motion in reply to the Speech from the Throne. The government may also designate any vote to be a matter of confidence, and opposition parties may introduce motions that explicitly express a lack of confidence in the government. During this period of Harper's tenureship, he began to increase the scope of what bills of the government could be considered confidence measures, reflecting the increasing willingness of the government to trigger an election based on favourable polling conditions.

==== Non-confidence motion and prorogation of Parliament, 2008 ====
Harper precipitated a national controversy, which threatened to overturn his government, by fielding a spending bill in the fall of 2008 which would have stripped taxpayer funding from political parties and taken away the right to strike from Canadian public service workers as purported solutions to the effects in Canada of the global economic crisis. Outraged opposition parties formed a coalition intending to call a vote of non-confidence that would have toppled the Harper government, but he avoided the impending vote of non-confidence by asking the Governor General to prorogue Parliament until January 26, 2009. Following the resumption of parliament, Harper introduced a new budget which was allowed to pass when members of the Liberal caucus voted for the budget with an amendment to budget motion.

=== Senate appointments ===
As prime minister, Harper recommended the appointment of 38 persons to the Senate of Canada. All of these senators were members of Harper's Conservative Party. Three (Michael Fortier, Fabian Manning, and Larry Smith) subsequently resigned from the Senate to seek election to the House of Commons.

Harper had long been an advocate of an elected Senate and appointed four senators (Bert Brown, Betty Unger, Doug Black, and Scott Tannas) based on the result of Alberta Senate nominee elections. Harper introduced legislation to provide for elections to advise the prime minister on whom to recommend for appointment to the Senate and to cause appointed senators to serve fixed terms, to, in essence, create a de facto elected Senate without changing the constitution. Harper's Senate appointments and reform proposals were criticized for failing to address the balance of seats among provinces, possibly being unconstitutional, and for running contrary to the spirit of his previous pledges for an elected senate. Harper argued that, without appointing senators, the Liberals would have continued to enjoy a majority in the Senate despite lacking popular support, the Senate would become less and less able to function, and all of his appointees agreed to resign and seek election to the senate should his reform proposals pass.

=== Libel suit against Liberal Party ===
Harper launched a lawsuit on March 13, 2008, against the Liberal Party of Canada over statements published on the party's website concerning the Chuck Cadman affair. This was the first time a sitting prime minister had sued the opposition for libel. The $2.5-million suit was named "The Liberal Party, the Federal Liberal Agency of Canada, and the unnamed author or authors of the statements published on the Liberal website". The articles at the centre of the lawsuit were headlined "Harper knew of Conservative bribery" and "Harper must come clean about allegations of Conservative Bribery". Those articles questioned Harper's alleged involvement in financial offers made to Cadman to sway his vote in a crucial 2005 Commons showdown. The suit filed in the Ontario Superior Court of Justice did not name Liberal Leader Stéphane Dion or MPs Ralph Goodale and Michael Ignatieff—whom Harper had also threatened to sue. The lawsuit was settled out of court in 2009 with both parties not disclosing the terms of settlement.

Dona Cadman said that before the May 2005 budget vote, Tom Flanagan and Doug Finley, two Conservative Party officials, offered her husband, Chuck Cadman, a million-dollar life insurance policy in exchange for his vote to bring down the Liberal government.

== Domestic and foreign policy ==
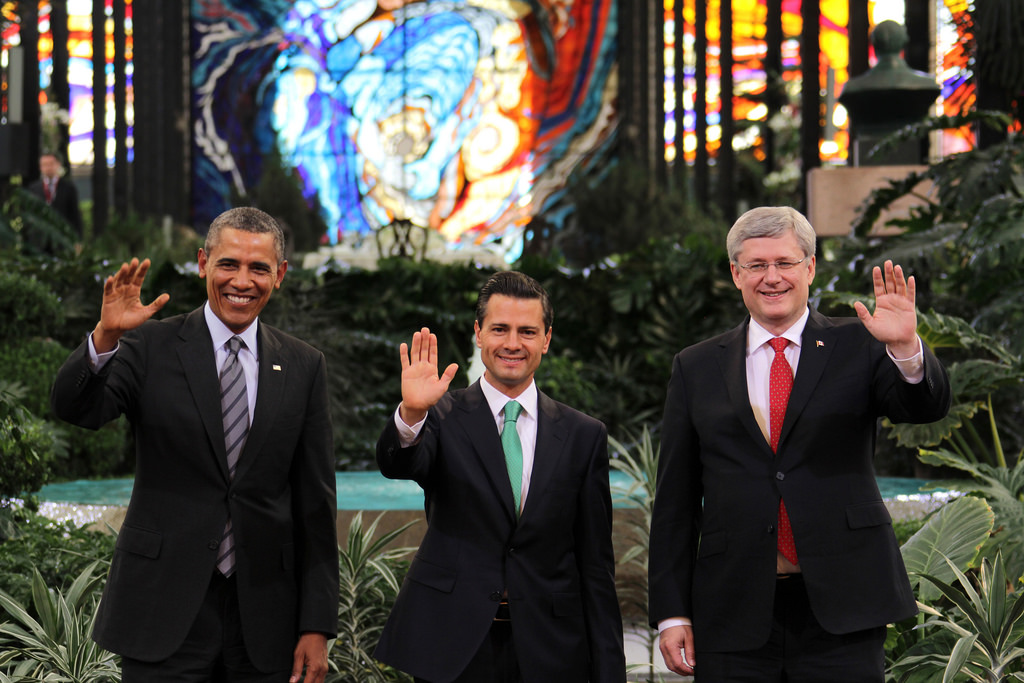
Harper, Mexican President Peña Nieto, and U.S. President Barack Obama at the 2014 North American Leaders' Summit

Harper's government introduced 9 budgets. The 2011 budget was not passed before the calling of the 2011 general election, but was adopted soon afterwards. Starting in 2008, each of his budgets ran a substantial deficit as a result of the 2008 global recession. Budgetary equilibrium returned in 2013, earlier than it was originally predicted. Harper's economic policy included a multitude of new spending and reduced government revenues due to reductions to the Goods and Services Tax and corporate income taxes. Harper campaigned on a pledge to increase defense spending and has cut it in real terms.

As with any Canadian government, the principal foreign relations issue is the relationship with the United States, Canada's closest neighbour and largest trading partner. The ongoing War in Afghanistan was also a major foreign policy issue for the Harper government, which withdrew Canadian troops from Afghanistan in 2011. As a result of economic sanctions against officials of the Russian government stemming from the annexation of Crimea by the Russian Federation, Harper had to contend with a sharp reduction in trade with Russia.

Harper’s domestic fiscal policy increased the Canadian M1 money supply from 350k million to 760K million.

== Scandals ==
Harper's Conservatives gained criticism for improper election spending during the 2006 federal election The scandal was known as the In and Out scandal. Parliamentary hearings into the issue led to a deadlocking of various committees, and then to the snap election in 2008. On 6 March 2012, charges were dropped as part of a plea deal in which the Conservative Party of Canada and its fundraising arm pleaded guilty to exceeding election spending limits and submitting fraudulent election records, and agreed to repay $230,198.00 for its role in violating Canadian election spending laws.

In February 2012, the Robocall scandal emerged regarding attempts at voter suppression targeting non-Conservative voters in 200 ridings during the 2011 election. The Royal Canadian Mounted Police and Elections Canada investigated the calls but ultimately did not refer the matter to the Director of Public Prosecutions. Michael Sona (a Conservative campaign worker in the riding of Guelph) was later found guilty of one count of willfully preventing or endeavoring to prevent an elector from voting in an election, an offence under the Canada Elections Act, and sentenced to nine months in prison.

== Cabinet ==
Although the majority of Conservative seats were from the Western provinces, the majority of names which Harper put forward to the Governor General for appointment as Cabinet Ministers were from Ontario and Quebec, in the interests of regional balance. The new Conservative Cabinet was substantially smaller than the prior Martin government because it initially did away with junior ministers (known as Ministers of State, and previously Secretaries of State). Several pundits in the media described Harper's Cabinet as moderate, and a tempering of the Conservative Party's roots in the Canadian Alliance and Reform.

=== Deputy Prime Minister and succession ===
Unlike his recent predecessors, Harper did not name one of his colleagues to the largely honorific post of Deputy Prime Minister. Harper did, however, name an order of succession to act on his behalf in certain circumstances, starting with Cannon, then Jim Prentice, then the balance of his cabinet in order of precedence.

== Media relations ==
Unlike previous Prime Ministers of Canada, Harper insisted that the Prime Minister's Office had the right to choose which reporters ask questions at press conferences, which, along with other steps aimed at limiting and controlling media access, created conflict with national media. It was reported that the Prime Minister's Office also "often [informed] the media about Harper's trips at such short notice that [it was] impossible for Ottawa journalists to attend the events."

Before the 2011 election, the Canadian Association of Journalists wrote a letter to the Standing Committee on Access to Information, Privacy and Ethics strongly criticizing the Canadian government for severely restricting access to documents that should be made available to Canadian citizens. The CAJ stated, "Open government is not revolutionary and the government of Canada is behind compared to other nations and even some provinces."

In 2011 Stephen Harper violated copyright when he sang the song "Imagine" without permission of the owner in a video that was later uploaded to YouTube. As a result, the video was removed by request of Yoko Ono’s publishing company. Although Canada's 2012 Copyright Modernization Act permits non-profit performances of copyrighted songs like "Imagine", it is still not legal to upload recordings of such performances to the Internet.

=== "Canada's New Government" and "Harper Government" ===
While Her Majesty's Governments of various political stripes have traditionally used the term "Government of Canada" to describe the government in its communications materials, the Harper government broke that tradition for two extended periods. From taking office in February 2006 until October 2007, the government was branded "Canada's New Government" and from late-2010 to mid-2011 it was branded the "Harper Government". The former was the subject of ridicule by other parties and some media commentators, while the latter was criticized by some academics and former civil servants as a partisan misuse of government resources. This is "political marketing", as constitutionally, any Government of Canada administered by a Canadian Ministry—Harper's premiership being the 28th Canadian Ministry— is known formally as "Her Majesty's Government".

=== Harperism ===
The term Harperism was coined and used by some in the Canadian media to describe Harper's policies and style during his premiership. The term has been used pejoratively to describe what some see as Harper's authoritarian approach to his cabinet and in the prorogation of the 40th Canadian parliament.

== Campaign promises ==
The federal governments of Justin Trudeau and Stephen Harper fulfilled the majority of their campaign promises and scored highest on fulfilling their campaign promises compared to any other "Canadian government over the last 35 years", according to an August 30, 2019 publication based on research at Laval University. The 237-page publication, Assessing Justin Trudeau’s Liberal Government. 353 promises and a mandate for change, includes the work of "two dozen Canadian academics". They found that Justin Trudeau's Liberal government kept 92 percent of pledges when complete and partial pledges were added together, while the Harper government kept 85 percent of complete and partial pledges. When only completed, realized pledges were calculated, Harper's government, in their last year, kept 77 percent of promises while the Liberal government kept 53.5 percent. The book notes that Harper's pledges tended towards transactional pledges which target sub-populations while Trudeau's government's promises were transformative.

== Supreme Court nominations ==
Harper chose the following jurists to be appointed as justices of the Supreme Court of Canada by the governor general:

- Marshall Rothstein (March 1, 2006 – August 31, 2015)
- Thomas Cromwell (September 5, 2008 – September 1, 2016)
- Andromache Karakatsanis (October 21, 2011–present)
- Michael J. Moldaver (October 21, 2011–present)
- Richard Wagner (October 5, 2012–present)
- Clément Gascon (June 9, 2014 – September 15, 2019)
- Russell Brown (August 31, 2015–present)

=== Marshall Rothstein ===
In keeping with Harper's election promise to change the appointment process, Rothstein's appointment involved a review by a parliamentary committee, following his nomination by the prime minister. Rothstein had already been short-listed, with two other candidates, by a committee convened by Paul Martin's previous Liberal government, and he was Harper's choice. Harper then had Rothstein appear before an ad hoc non-partisan committee of 12 members of Parliament. This committee was not empowered to block the appointment, though, as had been called for by some members of Harper's Conservative Party.

=== Thomas Cromwell ===
On September 5, 2008, Harper nominated Thomas Cromwell of Nova Scotia Court of Appeal to fill the Supreme Court seat left vacant by the departure of Michel Bastarache. By and large Cromwell's nomination was well received, with many lauding the selection; however, dissent has been noted surrounding the nomination. First, Harper bypassed Parliament's Supreme Court selection panel, which was supposed to produce a list of three candidates for him to choose from. Second, Newfoundland and Labrador Justice Minister Jerome Kennedy criticized the appointment, citing the Government of Newfoundland and Labrador's belief that constitutional convention stipulates that a Newfoundlander should have been named to the court in the rotation of Atlantic Canadian Supreme Court representation.

=== Marc Nadon ===
On October 3, 2013, Harper announced the nomination of supernumerary Federal Court of Appeals judge, Marc Nadon to the Supreme Court to replace the retiring Morris Fish. The appointment was challenged by both Ontario lawyer Rocco Galati and the Government of Quebec as being contrary to the appointment criteria of section 6 of the Supreme Court Act. In response, Harper referred the criteria issue to the Supreme Court, as well as the question of whether the government's amendments to the criteria were constitutional. The Supreme Court subsequently ruled in Reference re Supreme Court Act, ss. 5 and 6 that the Nadon appointment was invalid, and that the federal government could not unilaterally amend the Supreme Court Act. Harper subsequently nominated Clement Gascon to the position instead.

== See also ==
- Premierships of Pierre Trudeau
- Premiership of Jean Chrétien
- Premiership of Paul Martin
- Premiership of Justin Trudeau
- Premiership of Mark Carney

Canadian federal premierships
Preceded by Paul Martin	Stephen Harper; 2006–2015	Succeeded by Justin Trudeau
