= Premiership of Jean Chrétien =

Period of the Government of Canada from 1993 to 2003

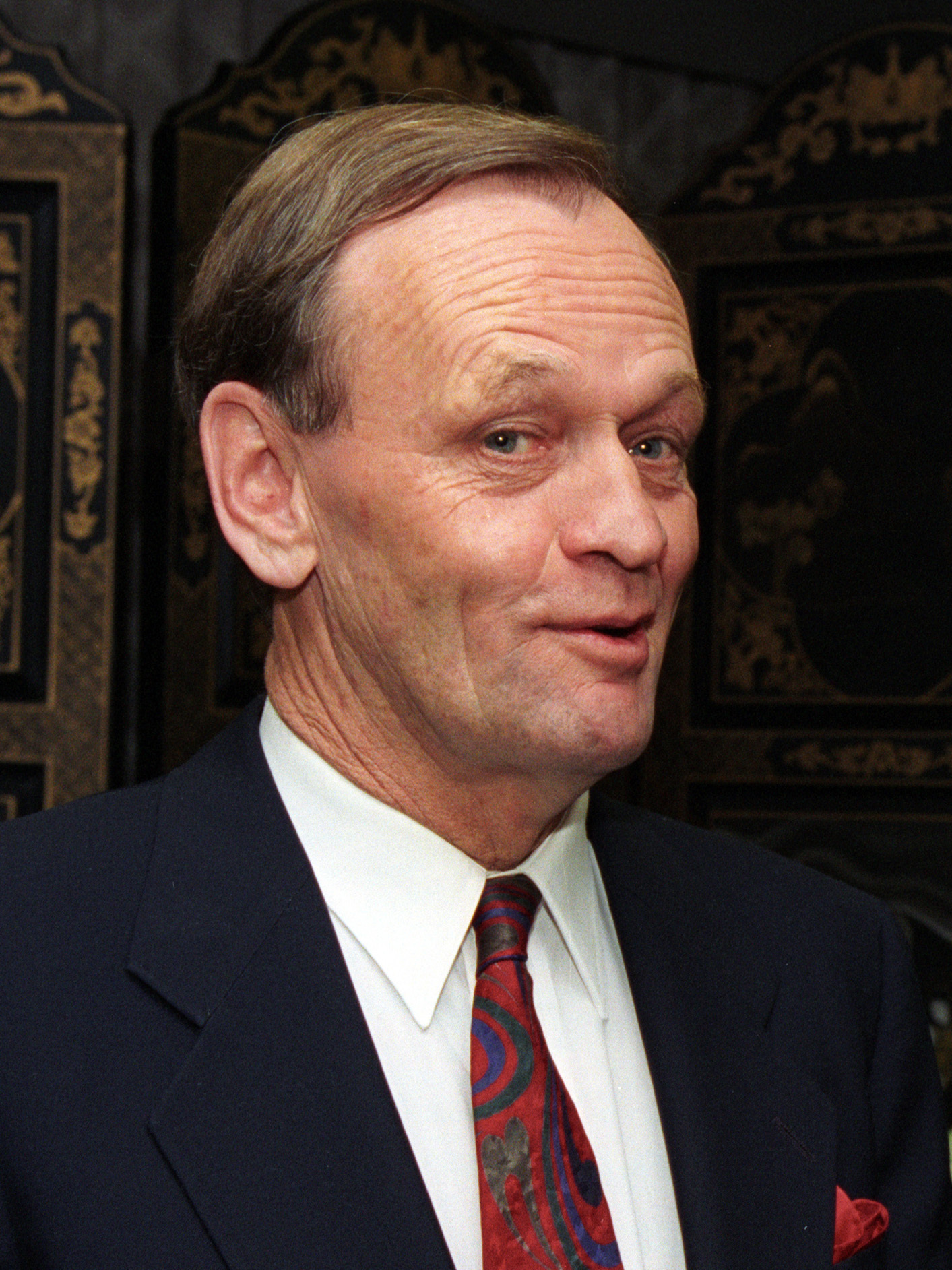
- Chrétien in 1993
- Premiership of Jean Chrétien; November 4, 1993 – December 12, 2003
- Monarch: Elizabeth II
- Prime Minister: Jean Chrétien
- Cabinet: 26th Canadian Ministry
- Party: Liberal
- Election: 1993; 1997; 2000
- Appointed by: Ray Hnatyshyn
- Seat: Office of the Prime Minister
- Constituency: Saint-Maurice

The premiership of Jean Chrétien began on November 4, 1993, when the first Cabinet headed by Jean Chrétien was sworn in by Governor General Ray Hnatyshyn. Chrétien was invited to form the 26th Canadian Ministry and become Prime Minister of Canada following the 1993 federal election, where Chrétien led his Liberal Party to win a majority of seats in the House of Commons of Canada, defeating the Progressive Conservative majority government of Prime Minister Kim Campbell. Chrétien led his Liberals to win two additional majorities in the federal elections of 1997 and 2000.

On December 12, 2003, Chrétien resigned as prime minister, being succeeded by his former finance minister, Paul Martin.

== Background ==
A lawyer from Quebec, Jean Chrétien was elected as a Liberal to the House of Commons in the 1963 election. He served in the Cabinet of Prime Ministers Lester Pearson and Pierre Trudeau; some of his notable portfolios included minister of Indian affairs and northern development, president of the Treasury Board, minister of finance, and minister of justice. Chrétien contested the leadership of the Liberal Party to succeed Trudeau in the 1984 leadership election, but came in second place to his former Cabinet colleague John Turner. After Turner led the Liberals to two consecutive defeats in the 1984 and 1988 federal elections, Chrétien became leader of the Liberals in the 1990 leadership election. He led the party to a strong majority government in the 1993 federal election. He then led the party to two additional majorities in the elections of 1997 and 2000.

== Tenure (1993–2003) ==
On November 4, 1993, Chrétien was appointed by Governor General Ray Hnatyshyn as prime minister. While Trudeau, Joe Clark, and Mulroney had been relative political outsiders prior to becoming prime minister, Chrétien had served in every Liberal cabinet since 1965. This experience gave him knowledge of the Canadian parliamentary system, and allowed Chrétien to establish a very centralized government that, although highly efficient, was also lambasted by critics such as Jeffrey Simpson and the media as being a "friendly dictatorship" and intolerant of internal dissent. Chrétien liked to present himself as the heir to Trudeau, but his governing style had little in common with the intense bouts of governmental activism that had characterised the Trudeau era. The Chrétien government had a cautious, managerial approach to governing, reacting to issues as they arose, and was otherwise inclined to inactivity.

In 2003, Chretien changed the way politics was done in Canada by introducing Bill C-24 the Canada Elections Act, on the recommendation of the Chief Electoral Officer of Canada, Jean-Pierre Kingsley.

=== Quebec ===
==== 1995 Quebec referendum ====
One of Chrétien's main concerns in office was separation of the province of Quebec, which was ruled by the sovereigntist Parti Québécois for nearly the entirety of his term. When the 1995 Quebec independence referendum began in September, Chrétien was relaxed and confident of victory as polls showed federalist forces were leading by a wide margin. On October 8, 1995, Lucien Bouchard replaced the separatist premier of Quebec, Jacques Parizeau, as the de facto chair of the oui committee and, at that point, the support for the oui side started to dramatically increase, aided by the non committee's complacency (they had been taking victory for granted). Unlike the "hard separatist" Parizeau (for whom nothing less than a totally independent Quebec republic would have sufficed), the "soft separatist" Bouchard argued for sovereignty association, which turned out to be a more appealing vision of the future to many Québécois. However, Chrétien considered the replacement of Parizeau with Bouchard a sign of weakness; it was only as October went on that he realized Bouchard was a much more formidable opponent than Parizeau.

In the weeks leading to the referendum on October 30, 1995, the federal government was seized with fear and panic as polls showing that, under the leadership of Bouchard, the oui side was going to win. An additional problem for the non side occurred when the Gaullist president of France, Jacques Chirac, stated in a TV interview that France would not only recognize an independent Quebec at once, but also use its influence within the European Union to have the other EU nations recognize Quebec as well, a statement that boosted support for the oui side. Such was Chrétien's alarm at Chirac's remark that the prime minister—who normally fiercely resented anything that smacked of American interference in Canadian internal affairs in the slightest—lobbied U.S. President Bill Clinton behind the scenes for an American statement in favor of a united Canada. Chrétien's efforts paid off, and Clinton not only came out very strongly for the federalist side in a TV interview, but also stated that an independent Quebec would not automatically become a member of NAFTA as the oui side was claiming.

With the federalist forces in open disarray and the polls showing that the oui side was going to win, Fisheries Minister Brian Tobin suggested organizing a gigantic "unity rally" in Montreal. The Unity Rally took place on October 27, 1995, when 100,000 people showed up. On the night of the referendum, the prospect of victory by the oui side was so realistic that Defence Minister David Collenette ordered the military to begin contingency plans to defend federal property in Quebec from a separatist take-over. On October 30, 1995, the federalist non side won by the narrowest of margins, with 50.58%. Chrétien blamed the narrow victory on the Quebec Liberals under Johnson, whom he claimed had betrayed him, argued the federalists would have done much better if only he had intervened in the referendum earlier, and presented the non case in terms of Trudeau-style "hard federalism" instead of the "soft federalist" non case presented by Johnson, which depicted the benefits of Confederation in purely economic terms and had a strongly nationalist (albeit federalist) tone of language.

==== Aftermath of referendum ====
On November 5, 1995, six days after the referendum, Chrétien and his wife escaped injury when André Dallaire, armed with a knife, broke in the prime minister's official residence at 24 Sussex Drive. Aline Chrétien shut and locked the bedroom door until security came, while Chrétien held a stone Inuit carving in readiness. Dallaire was a separatist who was angered by the result of the referendum.

In the aftermath of the narrow victory in the referendum, Chrétien started in late 1995 a new policy of "tough love", also known as "Plan B", where the federal government sought to discredit Quebec separatism by making it clear to the people of Quebec how difficult it would be to leave Canada. Though Chrétien had promised to enshrine recognition of Quebec as a "distinct society" in the constitution in order to win the referendum, this promise was quickly forgotten in the aftermath of victory with Chrétien arguing that the very vocal opposition of Ontario Premier Mike Harris to amending the constitution to recognize Quebec as a "distinct society" made that impossible. Instead, Chrétien had Parliament pass a resolution recognizing Quebec as a "distinct society", which had no constitutional force and was only a symbolic step. Though Harris's promise to veto any sort of "distinct society" clause in the constitution made fulfilling Chrétien's commitment to put such a clause into the constitution impossible, Chrétien did not seem to champion the idea of a "distinct society" clause with any great conviction.

In early 1996, the federal government launched an advertising program to increase the presence of Canada in Quebec, a policy that Chrétien believed would avoid a repeat of the near-defeat of 1995, and was to lead eventually to the Sponsorship scandal. As part of his "Plan B" for combatting Quebec separatism, in a speech in January 1996, Chrétien endorsed the idea of partitioning Quebec in the event of a oui vote in another referendum, stating all of the regions of Quebec that voted non would remain part of Canada, regardless of what the Quebec separatists thought. On February 15, 1996, Chrétien was confronted by a protester, Bill Clennett, during a walkabout in Hull, Quebec. Chrétien responded with a choke-hold. The press referred to it as the "Shawinigan handshake" (from the name of his home town).

In February 1999, the Social Union Framework Agreement (SUFA) was signed between Ottawa and the 9 of the 10 provinces (Quebec Premier Lucien Bouchard refused to sign the agreement). The SUFA had been promoted by Intergovernment Affairs Minister Stéphane Dion as a way of promoting a new era of federal-provincial harmony, but Chrétien himself was unenthusiastic, taking the view that the SUFA had given too much to the provinces and Chrétien had only signed the SUFA as a way of gaining the support of the 9 English provinces in his battles against the Bouchard government in Quebec. The SUFA turned out to be largely meaningless as the provinces and the federal government spent money on various social programs with little effort at the sort of co-operation that the SUFA had envisioned.

==== Clarity Act ====
After the 1995 referendum very narrowly defeated a proposal on Quebec sovereignty, Chrétien started to champion what eventually become the Clarity Act as part of his "Plan B". In August 1996, the lawyer Guy Bertrand won a ruling in a Quebec court declaring that the sovereignty question was not just a political matter between the federal and Quebec governments, but also a legal matter subject to court rulings. Following that ruling, Chrétien decided that here was a means of defeating the Quebec sovereignty movement and, in September 1996, ordered the Justice Minister Allan Rock to take the question of the legality of Quebec separating to the Supreme Court. Stéphane Dion advised Chrétien that, if the federal government won the reference to the Supreme Court as expected, the government should draft a bill stating the precise rules for Quebec to leave—telling Chrétien if the people of Quebec could be shown how difficult it would be to leave, then support for separatism would fall. Along the same lines, Dion started to send much-publicised open letters to Quebec ministers questioning the assumptions behind the separatist case.

In December 1999 the Chrétien government tabled the Clarity Act, which passed Parliament in June 2000. The Clarity Act, which was Chrétien's response to his narrow victory in the 1995 referendum requires that no Canadian government may acknowledge any province's declaration of independence unless a "clear majority" supports a "clear question" about sovereignty in a referendum, as defined by the Parliament of Canada, and a constitutional amendment is passed. The size of a "clear majority" is not specified in the Act. After the Clarity Act had passed by the House of Commons in February 2000, a poll showed that the federalist forces enjoyed a 15 percent lead in the polls on the question if Quebec should become independent, which Chrétien argued meant that the sovereignty option was now effectively off the table as Bouchard had always said he would only call another referendum if he could obtain "winning conditions", which he plainly did not possess at the moment.

=== Domestic affairs ===
Chrétien appointed his nephew, Raymond, as Canadian ambassador to the United States in 1994.

In November 1997, the Asia-Pacific Economic Cooperation (APEC) summit was held on the University of British Columbia (UBC) campus in Vancouver. Students on UBC's campus protested the meeting of some of these leaders because of their poor human rights practices. One of the leaders most criticized was Indonesian President Suharto. Demonstrators tore down a barrier and were pepper-sprayed by the Royal Canadian Mounted Police (RCMP). Other peaceful demonstrators were subsequently pepper-sprayed as well. There was debate over whether the action was necessary. Suharto had made clear that his coming to Canada was dependent upon his "dignity" not being insulted by any demonstrators. In response to Suharto's concerns about his "dignity" being called into question by protests, he had been promised by the Canadian government that no protesters would be allowed to get close and in early August 1997, the RCMP was informed by the PMO that the prime minister did not wish for any "distractions" at the up-coming conference. During the protests, a First Nations leader claimed to have overheard Chrétien giving orders to the RCMP to remove the signs protesting against the human rights violations in China and Indonesia at once before Suharto or Jiang had a chance to see them. Allegations soon arose that someone in the Prime Minister's Office or Chrétien himself gave the go-ahead for the pepper-spraying of protesters. Chrétien denied any involvement, and it has never been proven. On August 7, 2001, the APEC report was issued by Judge Ted Hughes, which cleared Chrétien of wrongdoing, but stated that Jean Carle of the PMO had improperly pressured the RCMP to attack the protesters. Hughes concluded that the RCMP had used excessive force that was in violation of the Charter of Rights and Freedoms. Hughes ruled that the use of force by the RCMP had gone beyond the legitimate security need to protect the visiting leaders at the APEC summit, and was intended to silence the protests altogether, which thus violated the right to freedom of expression guaranteed to all Canadians by the Charter of Rights and Freedoms.

In April 1998, the government attracted much criticism when the Health Minister Allan Rock waged a successful battle to limit the number of Canadians stricken with Hepatitis C through government negligence who could collect compensation for their suffering. Rock had wanted to compensate all of the hepatitis C victims, but was overruled by Chrétien, who told him the government would compensate only those afflicted between 1986 and 1990. Liberal backbencher Carolyn Bennett was later to claim in an interview that it was unconscionable on the part of Chrétien to refuse to compensate all of the hepatitis C victims, and then to spend $57 million in legal fees in a successful effort to stop hepatitis C activists from getting a ruling from the courts to compensate all victims.

In August 1999, the Anglo-Canadian media magnate Conrad Black was due to receive a British peerage. Two days before Black was to receive his title, Chrétien advised the Queen not to accord Black a title of nobility, citing the 1917 Nickle Resolution, where the Canadian House of Commons asked King George V not to grant any titles of nobility or knighthoods to Canadians, and thereby ensured that Black was not raised to the peerage as he was expecting to be. However, the Nickle resolution like all parliamentary resolutions was only symbolic, was in no way legally binding on Chrétien and several Canadians had been either knighted or raised to the House of Lords after 1917. Many saw Chrétien's blocking Black from a peerage not as a case of the prime minister merely enforcing the Nickle Resolution as Chrétien claimed, but rather as an act of revenge for the often critical coverage that Chrétien received from the National Post, which was owned by Black at that time. By contrast, Chrétien's close associate Eddie Goldenberg was later to claim that Chrétien cared deeply about the Nickle Resolution, and would have had blocked Black from being raised to the peerage even if the National Post were more friendly to him. Black, who felt humiliated by this episode, sued Chrétien for what he alleged to be an abuse of power, leading to the legal case of Black v. Chrétien. In 2001, the court ruled in favor of Chrétien, stating it was the prime minister's prerogative to advise the Queen not to raise Canadians to the British peerage if he felt so inclined, and thereforth this was not an abuse of power as Black had claimed. Black gave up his Canadian citizenship to accept the title.

=== Firearms ===
In 1995, the Chrétien government introduced and passed the Canadian Firearms Registry, also called the long-gun registry. This would require the registration of all non-restricted firearms in Canada. This gun registry would document and record information of the firearms, their owners, and their owners' licenses.

=== Criminal justice reform ===
The government under Chrétien's premiership introduced a new and far-reaching Youth Criminal Justice Act in April 2003, which replaced the Young Offenders Act and changed the way youths were prosecuted for crimes in Canada.

=== Same-sex marriage ===
In July 2003, Chrétien reversed his position on gay marriage, which he had previously been opposed to (in 1999 Chrétien had voted for a resolution sponsored by the Reform saying marriage was a union of a man and a woman only). After a Toronto court ruled that laws forbidding homosexual marriage violated the Charter of Rights and Freedoms, legalizing same-sex marriage throughout Ontario, Chrétien embraced the idea of gay marriage and introduced a bill in the House of Commons that would have legalized gay marriage despite the very vocal opposition of the Roman Catholic Church with the bishop of Calgary warning in a sermon that Chrétien's "eternal salvation" was at risk.

=== Environment ===
A flurry of major environmental legislation, including the Canadian Environmental Protection Act, National Marine Conservation Areas Act, Pest Control Products Act, and the Species at Risk Act were enacted.

=== Economic policy ===
==== Refusal to renew term for Bank of Canada governor ====
One of Chrétien's first acts had been not to renew the contract of the governor of the Bank of Canada, John Crow, who was replaced with Gordon Thiessen on February 1, 1994. Crow's policy of high interest rates in the early 1990s to achieve zero percent inflation had made him almost as unpopular as the GST, indeed so unpopular that Chrétien had promised to fire him during the 1993 election campaign. Chrétien, who was fearful of the market reaction if he should sack the Bank of Canada governor, sent the new finance minister Paul Martin to meet with Crow in December 1993 to tell him that he could remain as governor provided that he was willing to forgo his zero percent inflation target and end the punishingly high interest rates, which Chrétien believed to be a major cause of the recession. Crow told Martin that the government should mind its own business, at which point Chrétien decided to keep his promise.

==== 1994 budget and early policies ====
A major issue for Chrétien's first term was the large national debt that had been inherited from the Trudeau and Mulroney eras. Despite this, the first budget introduced by Martin, in February 1994, recorded a deficit of $36.6 billion, a minor decrease from the 1993 budget's $38.5 billion. The budget focused on reducing the deficit to 3 percent of gross national product (GNP) within three years. Outside of cutting defence spending, there were few cuts in the 1994 budget. According to the diplomat James Bartleman, Chrétien told him in early 1994 that major cuts to government spending outside of defence were out of the question, and instead he hoped that the economy would grow enough on its own that the deficit would disappear without any cuts. Chrétien's plans in early 1994 for economic growth were to increase exports by embracing globalization and free trade with as many nations as possible, arguing that the export offensive would stimulate the economy out of the early 1990s recession. The 1994 budget was widely criticized by journalists such as Andrew Coyne as useless in even achieving its target of reducing the deficit to 3 percent of GNP within three years, let alone eliminating the deficit. In April 1994, interest rates in Canada started a steady rise that would continue until early 1995.

Further adding to the financial pressure of the debt situation, in May 1994, Moody's downgraded Canada's debt, citing the high debt levels and concerns about a lack of political will to deal with the deficit. A vicious circle had been created. The underwhelming 1994 budget was taken as a sign that the Liberals were not serious about eliminating the deficit, which in turn created severe doubts among investors holding or considering buying government of Canada bonds that they would be repaid when the bonds matured. As a result, investors stopped buying government of Canada bonds, which forced the Bank of Canada to raise the interest rates in order to attract buyers of Canada bonds. The rising interest rates, aside from hindering economic activity and thus hurting the government's ability to collect taxes, raised the costs of servicing the existing national debt, which in turn created further doubts among investors that they would be repaid, thus starting the circle all over again. As the vicious circle caused by the lack of investor confidence and rising interest rates continued into the fall of 1994, the 3% target became increasingly less realistic, and Martin became more and more influenced by Deputy Minister of Finance David Dodge's advice that something more drastic needed to be done than achieving the 3 percent target.

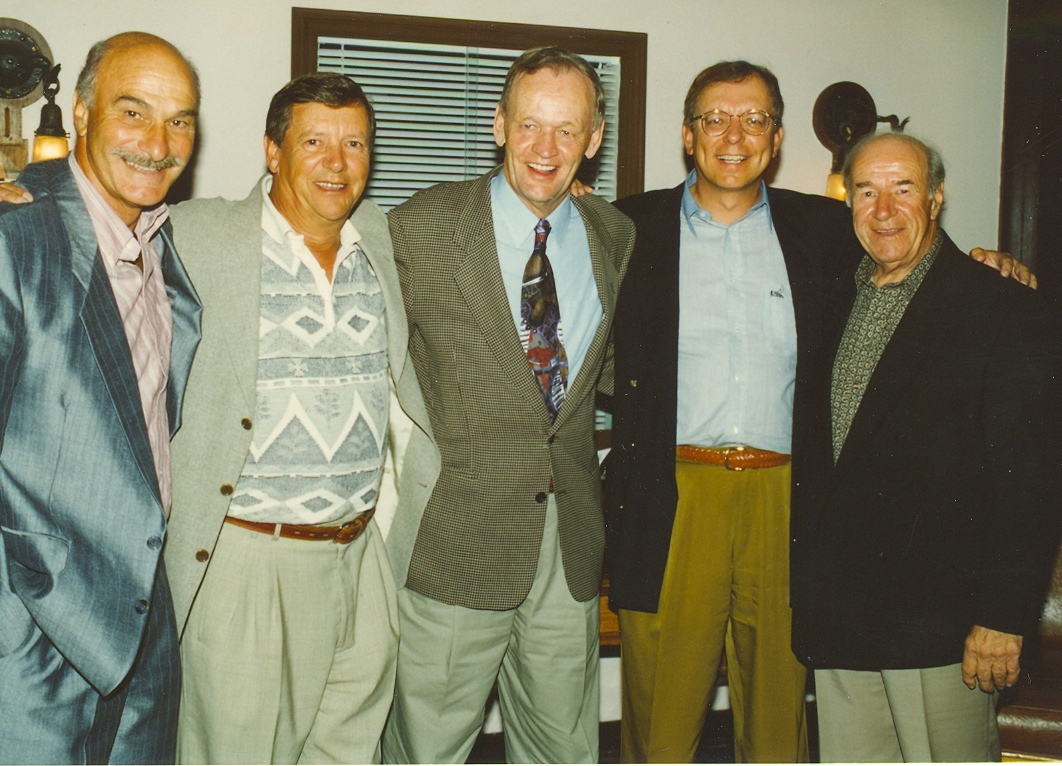
Chrétien in 1996

==== 1995–1997 budgets: Eliminating the deficit ====
In January 1995, The Wall Street Journal published an editorial written by John Fund entitled "Bankrupt Canada?" strongly critical of the Chrétien government's deficit-fighting amid a crisis atmosphere caused by the collapse of the Mexican economy in late 1994, the steep decline of the Canadian dollar, and soaring interest rates, which put strong pressure on the Chrétien government to do more to reduce the deficit. The Wall Street Journal's editorial "Bankrupt Canada?" attracted much media attention in Canada and was taken as a sign that all was not well with the national finances. In particular, by early 1995 the rising interest rates started to make the 3 percent deficit target more and more unrealistic, and thus pressured the government to introduce a budget that would assure the markets that the deficit would be eliminated, not reduced in the near-future. Further applying pressure on Canada was a warning from Moody's that Canada's debt rating would be downgraded again if the 1995 budget did not contain a credible deficit elimination plan. Martin went on a tour of various world financial centers in early 1995 to drum up interest in buying Canadian bonds, and found that investors had no such interest, telling him that Canada had been promising to deal with the deficit since the 1970s, and they wanted action, not words this time.

It was only with the budget that Martin introduced on February 27, 1995, that the Chrétien government began a policy of cuts designed to eliminate the deficit in order to reassure the markets. Chrétien's government began a program of deep cuts to provincial transfers and other areas of government finance. Social spending as a percentage of GDP fell from 20.35 percent in 1993, to 18.35 percent in 1995, eventually falling to 16.94 percent in 1997 and 15.76 percent in 2000, and eventually rising to 16.29 percent in 2003. The deficit was $30 billion.

Much of the Liberal caucus was deeply unhappy with the 1995 budget, arguing that this was not what they had been elected for in 1993, only to be informed by the prime minister that there was no alternative. Chrétien himself expressed his unhappiness with his budget in a radio interview with Peter Gzowski in March 1995, saying about the budget:

"It is not our pleasure sir, I have to tell you that. I've been around a long time. It's no pleasure at all. I'm not doctrinaire, a right-winger. I'm a Liberal, and I feel like a Liberal, and it is painful. But it is needed".

Chrétien was not keen on making deep cuts to government spending, but given the crisis caused by the skyrocketing interest rates had decided "reluctantly" there was no alternative. Once he had decided upon making deeper cuts than he promised, Chrétien proved to be firm supporter of the new course, and supported Martin's cuts to other departments despite the complaints of the other ministers. In a 2011 interview, Chrétien recalled about the 1995 budget that: "There would have been a day when we would have been the Greece of today. I knew we were in a bind and we had to do something."

The 1995 budget, which was called by Peter C. Newman a "watershed document" that marked the first time in recent memory that anybody had made a serious effort to deal with the deficit, won a favorable reaction from the international markets, and a led to an immediate fall in interest rates. There were, however, undeniable costs associated with this endeavour. The cuts resulted in fewer government services, most noticeably in the health care sector, as major reductions in federal funding to the provinces meant significant cuts in service delivery. Moreover, the across-the-board cuts affected the operations and achievement of the mandate of most federal departments. Many of the cuts were restored in later years of Chrétien's period in office.

The Chrétien government's March 1996 budget recorded a deficit of $8.719 billion. This was a dramatic decrease from the previous year's deficit of $30 billion.

In February 1998, for the first time since 1969 a balanced budget was presented by the government. After, five consecutive budget surpluses were recorded (thanks in part to favorable economic times) and $36 billion in debt was paid down.

===== Conflicts within Liberal caucus over budget cuts =====
In order to silence objections to the cuts from left-wing Liberal backbenchers and Cabinet ministers, Chrétien ensured that the Program Review Committee chaired by Marcel Massé that would decide what programs to end and which to cut had a majority comprising the leftist MPs Brian Tobin, Sheila Copps, Sergio Marchi and Herb Gray, people who would not normally be supporting cutting programs, and thereby underlined the seriousness of the crisis.

Though Chrétien had supported Martin in his plans for cuts, he did not allow Martin to go as far as he would have liked with cutting various social programs and to devolve spending powers to the provinces as a way of cutting federal government expenditure. As a "hard federalist", Chrétien fiercely objected to what he saw as the "soft federalist" Martin's attempts to weaken the power of the federal government under the guise of cutting the deficit. One senior Liberal later recalled about the Chrétien-Martin debate about reforming Old Age Security that:

Martin had been told "no" by the prime minister three times and still he persisted...his insubordination was unprecedented. It got to the point where Chrétien had to draw a line in the sand and say "I'm the prime minister and you're the finance minister and I'm saying no!".

==== Taxation ====
In the 1996 budget, the backbencher Liberal MP John Nunziata voted against the budget under the grounds it failed to repeal the GST as the Liberals had promised in 1993 and singled out for criticism his former Rat Pack colleague Sheila Copps, who had promised during the 1993 election to resign within a year if the GST was not repealed. Chrétien's response was to expel Nunziata from the Liberal caucus. However, the expulsion of Nunziata drew attention to the fact that Copps was still in office despite her promise to resign within a year if the GST was not repealed. Chrétien first stated that Copps would stay in Parliament despite her promise of 1993, but then intense public pressure (together with a poll showing Copps would win a by-election) forced Copps to resign from the Parliament. After resigning, Copps then contested the resulting by-election, where she won and then went straight back into the Cabinet. To help defuse anger over the GST issue, in the spring of 1996 the Chrétien government moved to harmonize sales taxes (GST with provincial taxes) by signing an accord with three of the four Atlantic provinces; the other provinces were not interested in the federal offer to harmonize.

Under Chrétien's government, taxes were cut by $100 billion (cumulatively) over five years.

==== Military spending ====
The 1994 budget brought in modest cuts, mostly to defence spending. Until the terrorist attacks of September 11, 2001, the Chrétien government tended to be hostile towards defence spending with the government's white paper "Defence 94" declaring that in a post-Cold War world there would be less and less need for armed forces, which accordingly meant reduced budgets for the military.

==== Other measures ====
In the 1997 budget, the Chrétien government introduced the National Child Benefit program for the children of low-income parents.

Chrétien cancelled the privatization of Toronto's Pearson airport. The consortium that was due to take ownership of Pearson sued for breach of contract, which led the government to settle out of court in April 1997 for $60 million in damages.

Using the low incomes cut-offs after tax measure, the percentage of Canadians who had low income in 1993 was 14.1 percent; in 1995, when the budget was introduced, that figure had jumped to 14.5; in 2003, the end of Chrétien's time in office, that number had fallen to just 11.6 percent.

Chrétien's major policy initiative in the first half of 2001 was increasing the pay of MPs by 20 percent. As a result, the pay of MPs went from $109,000 per year to $131,000 per year while Chrétien's own salary went from $184,000 per year to $262,000 per year.

=== Foreign policy ===
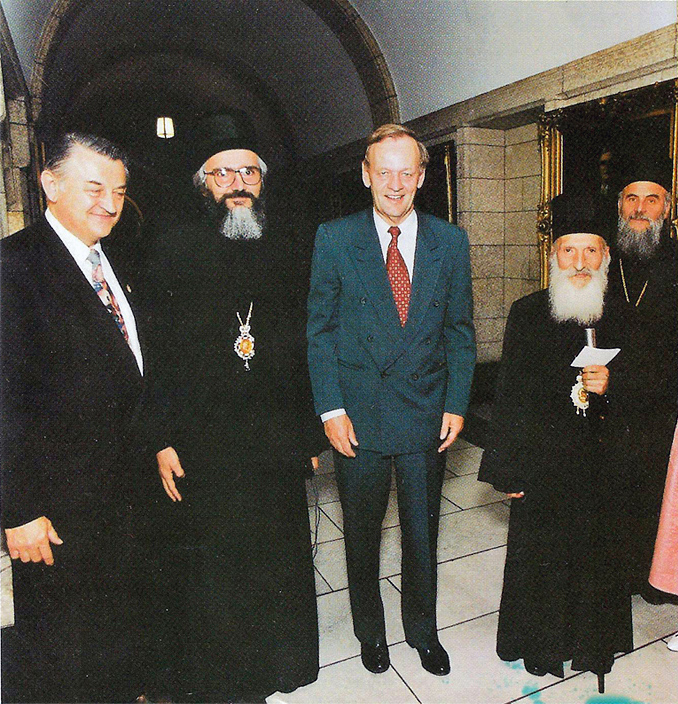
Chrétien with Bishops and the Patriarch of the Serbian Orthodox Church, 1994.

==== Rwandan genocide ====
In February–March 1994, detailed reports from the Canadian embassy in Kigali meant that the Canadian government was one of the best informed nations in the world about the coming Rwandan genocide. Foreign Minister André Ouellet claimed that neither he nor anyone else in the Cabinet ever saw the reports from Rwanda. On April 6, 1994, the Rwandan genocide began. The government in Ottawa was apparently kept well-informed about what was happening by diplomats and Canadian Forces serving as UN peacekeepers, but the genocide was not considered to be a major problem for Canada, with the Chrétien government taking the view that other powers would stop the genocide. The government first insisted in April 1994 that there was only a civil war in Rwanda, and once it became clear that genocide had begun, on May 2, 1994, Ouellet, speaking for the government in the House of Commons promised humanitarian aid and expressed the hope that the Organization for African Unity would do something to stop the genocide. In 2010, the Canadian government apologized to the people of Rwanda for indifference to the genocide of 1994.

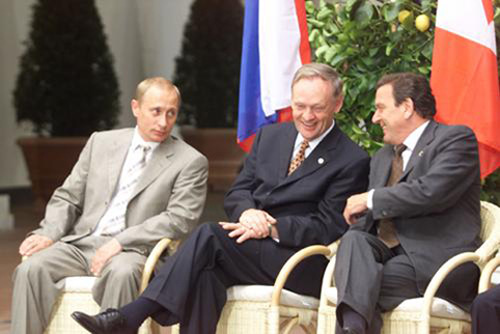
Chrétien meeting with President Vladimir Putin of Russia and Chancellor Gerhard Schroeder of Germany in July 2001.

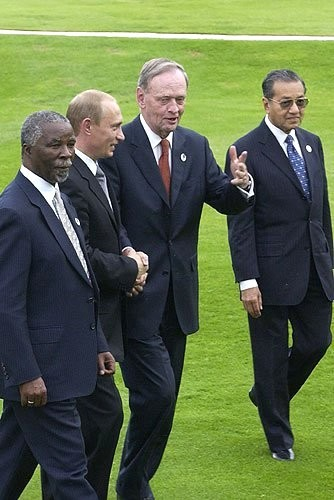
Chrétien with South-African President Thabo Mbeki (left), Vladimir Putin and the Malaysian Prime Minister Mahathir Mohamad in June 2003.

==== Canada in the Yugoslav Wars ====
In the spring of 1999, Chrétien supported Canada's involvement in the North Atlantic Treaty Organization (NATO) bombing campaign of FR Yugoslavia over the issue of Kosovo, even through the operation was unsanctioned by the United Nations Security Council thanks to a Russian veto of an Anglo-American resolution asking for the Security Council's approval of the NATO bombing. The idea of bombing Yugoslavia caused some discomfort within the ranks of the Liberal party as the NATO campaign effectively meant supporting Kosovo separatists against a government determined to prevent Kosovo's secession from Yugoslavia. Chrétien was personally uncomfortable with the idea of bombing Yugoslavia, but supported the war because he valued good relations with the United States far more than he cared about Yugoslavia. Chrétien's foreign minister at the time, Lloyd Axworthy justified Canada's involvement in NATO bombing of Yugoslavia under the grounds that allegations of massacres against ethnic Albanians in Kosovo made the use of force legitimate on humanitarian grounds, even without the approval of the UN Security Council. Likewise, Chrétien was later to tell Lawrence Martin that it was far better to intervene in the internal affairs of Yugoslavia to stop human rights violations in the Kosovo region by Serbian forces than to do nothing.

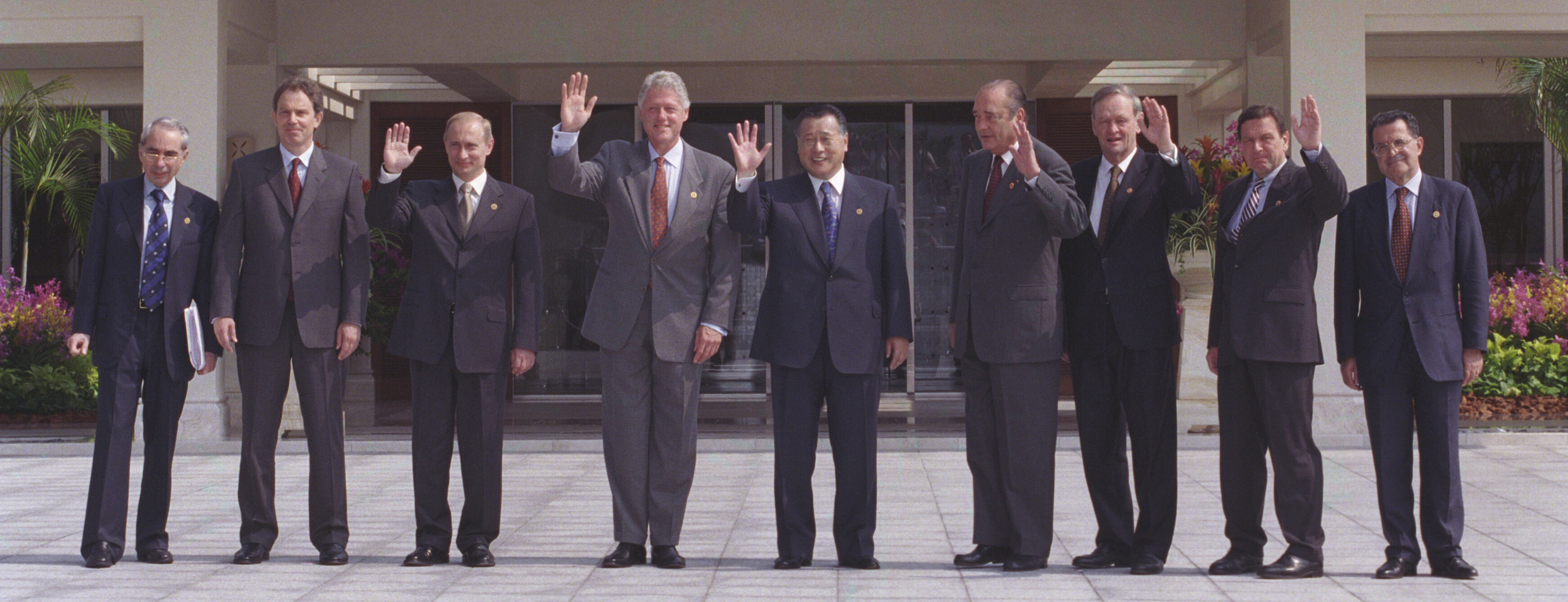
Chrétien at the G8 Summit, July 2000

==== China ====
Chrétien was known to be a Sinophile and an admirer of the People's Republic of China. In November 1994, he led the first of four "Team Canada" trade missions comprising himself and 9 premiers to China (Quebec Premier Jacques Parizeau having declined to go), which had as their stated objective increasing Sino-Canadian trade. The Team Canada mission was meant to be the beginning of the export offensive that would stimulate the economy out of the recession, and also to achieve Chrétien's goal going back to the 1970s of a Canadian economy less dependent on trade with the United States. Under his leadership, China and Canada signed several bilateral relations agreements. The Team Canada missions attracted criticism that Chrétien seemed concerned only with economic issues, that he rarely raised the subject of China's poor human rights record, and that on the few occasions that he did mention human rights in China he went out of his way to avoid offending his hosts. Moreover, Chrétien attracted criticism for presenting the case for improved human rights in purely economic terms, arguing that a better human rights record would allow China to join the WTO and thus sell more goods to the West. Chrétien argued that there was no point in criticizing China's human rights record because the Chinese never listened to such criticism, and instead were greatly annoyed about being lectured by Western leaders about their poor human rights record. Given that Canada could not really do anything to change the views of China's leaders about human rights, Chrétien contended that the best that could be done was to improve Sino-Canadian economic relations while ignoring the subject of human rights.

==== United States ====
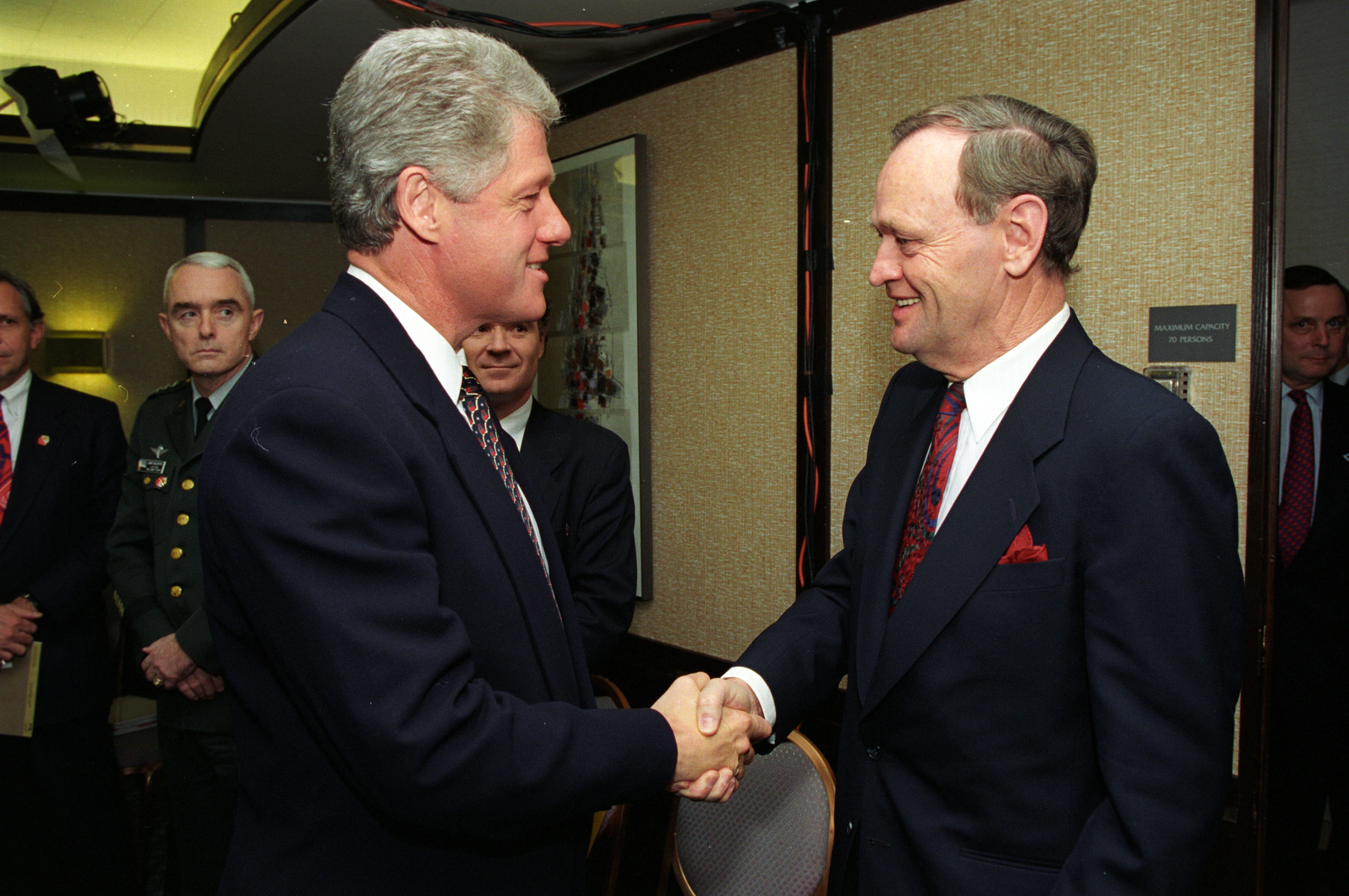
Chrétien with US President Bill Clinton, 1993.

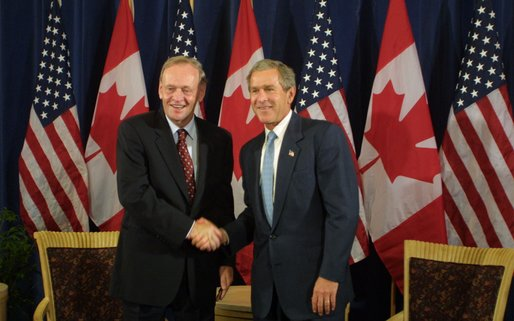
Chrétien with US President George W. Bush, 2002.

Chrétien phoned U.S. President Bill Clinton in November 1993 to ask him to renegotiate aspects of NAFTA. Clinton bluntly refused, saying that it had been extremely difficult to get Congress to ratify NAFTA, and if NAFTA was renegotiated, then he would have to submit the renegotiated treaty again for ratification, which was not something that he was going to do just for the sake of Chrétien. Clinton informed the prime minister that he could either scrap NAFTA or accept it as it was, and that the most he could offer were a few cosmetic concessions like writing a letter saying the United States was not interested in taking over Canada's energy and water. Chrétien chose the latter, and sought to portray Clinton's letter as a major American concession that constituted a renegotiated NAFTA, though in fact Clinton's letter was not legally binding and meant nothing. Only treaties ratified by Congress are legally binding on the U.S. government and presidential letters impose only a moral obligation, not a legal one, on the U.S government.

Following the September 11 attacks, Canadian forces joined with multinational to pursue al-Qaeda in Afghanistan. U.S. President George W. Bush had also commended how Canada responded to the crisis. Among them included Operation Yellow Ribbon and the memorial service on Parliament Hill three days after 9/11. In January 2002, Chrétien together with the Defence Minister Art Eggleton were accused of misleading Parliament. When asked in Question Period if Canadian troops had handed over captured Taliban and al-Qaeda members in Afghanistan to the American forces amid concerns about the treatment of POWs at Guantanamo Bay, Chrétien stated this was only a "hypothetical question" that could not be answered as the Canadians had taken no POWs. Critics of the government such as Joe Clark then pointed out that in the previous week, The Globe & Mail had run on its front p. a photo of Canadian soldiers turning over POWs to American troops. Eggleton claimed that he had only learned of the policy of handing over POWs several days after the photo had appeared in The Globe and Mail. When pressed by opposition critics about his apparent ignorance of what was Canada's policy on turning over POWs captured in Afghanistan, Eggleton then claimed that he had not only forgotten that he had been briefed by senior bureaucrats that Canadian Forces were to hand over POWs to the Americans, but that he had also forgotten to inform the Cabinet.

One year after the 9/11 attacks, Chretien gave controversial remarks about what led to the attacks, suggesting they were a reaction to Western foreign policy. During the 2002 CBC interview, Chretien said "I do think that the Western world is getting too rich in relations to the poor world. And necessarily, we're looked upon as being arrogant, self-satisfied, greedy and with no limits. And the 11th of September is an occasion for me to realize it even more. When you are powerful like you are, you guys, it's the time to be nice. And it is one of the problems — you cannot exercise your powers to the point of humiliation of the others. And that is what the Western world — not only the Americans but the Western world — has to realize." The comments were condemned by the new Official Opposition leader and the new Canadian Alliance leader, Stephen Harper, who charged Chretien with victim blaming, while the leaders of the New Democratic Party and Progressive Conservative Party did not interpret Chretien's comments as critical of the United States.

==== Refusal to join the Iraq War ====
Chrétien's government did not support the US-led 2003 invasion of Iraq. His reasoning was that the war lacked UN Security Council sanction; while not a member of the Security Council, Canada nevertheless attempted to build a consensus for a resolution authorizing the use of force after a short (two to three-month) extension to UN weapon inspections in Iraq. Critics also noted that, while in opposition, he had also opposed the first US-led Gulf War, which had been approved by the UN Security Council and in 1999 supported NATO air strikes against Serbia, which had no Security Council approval. In order to avoid damaging relations with the United States, Chrétien agreed to another and larger deployment of Canadian troops to Afghanistan on February 12, 2003, in order to prove that Canada was still a good American ally, despite opposing the upcoming Iraq war. Canada sent 2,000 soldiers to Afghanistan in the summer of 2003.

==== Other ====
In early 2001 Chrétien personally lobbied Chilean President Ricardo Lagos in favour of Canadian mining to ease Chile's ban on asbestos. Later that year Canadian diplomats in Chile made a new unsuccessful attempt to lobby Chilean government to ease the asbestos ban, sparking Chilean trade unions to protest outside Canada's embassy in Santiago.

=== Defence policy ===
In 1993, Chrétien canceled the contract to buy the EH-101 helicopters, requiring the search for new helicopters to start over, and paid a $478 million termination fee to AgustaWestland.

In January 1998, Chrétien's government announced that the CH-113 helicopters would be replaced by a scaled-down search-and-rescue variant of the EH101, carrying the designation CH-149 Cormorant. Unlike the Petrel/Chimo contract which Chrétien had cancelled in 1993, these 15 aircraft were to be built entirely in Europe with no Canadian participation or industrial incentives. The first two aircraft arrived in Canada in September 2001 and entered service the following year. His Maritime Helicopter Project was supposed to find a low-cost replacement aircraft. The candidates were the Sikorsky S-92, the NHIndustries NH90 and the EH-101, although critics accused the government of designing the project so as to prevent AgustaWestland from winning the contract. A winner, the Sikorsky CH-148 Cyclone, would not be announced until after Chrétien retired.

=== Reelections ===
==== 1997 federal election ====
Chrétien called an early election in the spring of 1997, hoping to take advantage of his position in the public opinion polls and the continued division of the conservative vote between the Progressive Conservative Party and the upstart Reform Party of Canada. Despite slipping poll numbers, he advised the governor general to call an election in 1997, a year ahead of schedule. Many of his own MPs criticized him for this move, especially in light of the devastating Red River Flood, which led to charges of insensitivity. Liberal MP John Godfrey tried hard to interest Chrétien in an ambitious plan to eliminate urban poverty in Canada as a platform to run on in the election, which was vetoed by Eddie Goldenberg and John Rae of the PMO, who convinced Chrétien that it was better to stick with an "incrementalist" course of small changes than risk any grand project. The Progressive Conservatives had a popular new leader in Jean Charest and the New Democrats' Alexa McDonough led her party to a breakthrough in Atlantic Canada, where the Liberals had won all but one seat in 1993. Chrétien benefited when the Reform Party aired a TV ad in English Canada charging that the country was being dominated by French-Canadian politicians, which Chrétien used to accuse Preston Manning of being anti-French. In 1997, the Liberals lost all but a handful of seats in Atlantic Canada and Western Canada, but managed to retain a bare majority government due to their continued dominance of Ontario.

==== 2000 federal election ====
Chrétien called another early election in the fall of 2000, again hoping to take advantage of the split in the Canadian right and catch the newly formed Canadian Alliance and its neophyte leader Stockwell Day off guard. At the funeral of Pierre Trudeau in September 2000, the Cuban President, Fidel Castro happened to meet with Day. Later that same day, Chrétien met with Castro, where Chrétien asked Castro about his assessment of Day and if he should call an early election or not. Castro advised Chrétien to dissolve Parliament early as he considered Day to be a lightweight, and as Castro was a leader whom Chrétien respected, his advice was an important reason for the election. Finance Minister Paul Martin released a 'mini-budget' just before the election call that included significant tax cuts, a move aimed at undermining the Alliance position going into the campaign. Chrétien formed a "war room" comprising his communications director Françoise Ducros, Warren Kinsella, Duncan Fulton and Kevin Bosch to gather material to attack Day as a right-wing extremist. In the first weeks of the 2000 election, the Canadian Alliance gained in the polls and some voters complained that Chrétien overstayed his time in office and had no agenda beyond staying in power for the sake of staying in power. The fact that the Red Book of 2000 consisted almost entirely of recycled promises from the Red Books of 1993 and 1997 and various banal statements further reinforced the impression of a prime minister with no plans or vision for Canada and whose only agenda was to hang onto power as long as possible. However, the Liberal claim that Day planned to dismantle the health care system to replace it with a "two-tier" health care system along with a number of gaffes on Day's part in addition to Alliance candidate Betty Granger warning that Canada was faced with the threat of an "Asian invasion" (which furthered the Liberals' plan to paint the Alliance as a xenophobic and extreme right-wing party) started to turn opinion decisively against the Canadian Alliance. Day's socially conservative views were also attacked by Chrétien as the Liberals claimed that Day would make homosexuality and abortion illegal. The New Democrats and Bloc Québécois also ran lacklustre campaigns, while the Progressive Conservatives, led by former Prime Minister Joe Clark, struggled to retain official party status. On November 27, the Liberals secured a strong majority mandate in the 2000 election, winning nearly as many seats as they had in 1993, largely thanks to significant gains in Quebec and in Atlantic Canada. Without Jean Charest as leader, the PCs who had done well in winning the popular vote in Quebec in 1997 fared poorly in 2000, and most of their voters defected over to the Liberals.

=== Scandals and controversies ===
==== Shawinigate ====
In late 2000 and early 2001, politics were dominated by questions about the Grand-Mere Affair (or the Shawinigate scandal). Opposition parties frequently charged that Chrétien had broken the law in regards to his lobbying for Business Development Bank of Canada for loans to the Auberge Grand-Mère inn. Questions were especially centered around the firing of the president of the bank, François Beaudoin, and the involvement of Jean Carle, formerly of the PMO, in sacking Beaudoin. Carle served as Chrétien's chief of operations between 1993 and 1998 before leaving to take up an executive post at the Business Development Bank. Chrétien claimed that Carle was not involved in any way with the loans to the Grand-Mere Inn, only to be countered by Joe Clark, who produced a leaked document showing that he was. After initial denials, Chrétien acknowledged having lobbied the Business Development Bank to grant a $2 million loan to Yvon Duhaime. Duhaime was a friend and constituent to whom the Prime Minister stated that he had sold his interest in the Grand-Mère Inn, a local Shawinigan-area hotel and golf resort, eventually providing evidence of the sale—a contract written on a cocktail napkin. Duhaime was a local businessman with an unsavoury reputation and a criminal record, who received a loan from the Business Development Bank that he was ineligible to collect on the account of his criminal record (Duhaime did not mention his record when applying for the loan). The bank had turned down the initial loan application, but later approved a $615,000 loan following further lobbying by Chrétien. When the bank refused to extend the loan in August 1999 under the grounds that Duhaime had a bad financial history, Beaudoin was fired by Chrétien in September 1999, which led to a wrongful dismissal suit that Beaudoin was to win in 2004. It was revealed that Chrétien had never been paid for his share in the sale of the adjoining golf course, and criminal charges were laid against Duhaime. On February 19, 2001, the RCMP announced that there they did not find sufficient evidence to lay criminal charges against anyone in regards to the Grand-Mere Affair, and Chrétien accused Clark of waging a "witch hunt" against the Liberals. On March 2, 2001, the federal ethics counselor Howard Wilson cleared Chrétien of wrongdoing in the Grand-Mere Affair. On April 5, 2001, the National Post received documents purportedly from an anonymous source within the bank, indicating that Chrétien was still owed $23,040 by Duhaime for his share in the Auberge Grand-Mère. The revelation of the Grand-Mère affair did not affect the outcome of the 2000 election. Chrétien and his circle believed that the breaking of the Grand-Mère story was the work of the Martin faction.

==== Sponsorship Scandal ====
The major controversy of the later Chrétien years was the Sponsorship Scandal, which involved more than $100 million distributed from the Prime Minister's Office to Quebec's federalist and Liberal Party interests without much accountability. On May 8, 2002, the Sponsorship Scandal broke when the auditor general, Sheila Fraser, issued a report accusing Public Works bureaucrats of having broken "just about every rule in the book" in awarding $1.6 million to the Montreal ad firm Groupaction Marketing Inc. The money awarded to Groupaction in three dubious contracts appeared to have disappeared, and the firm had a long history of donating to the Liberals. Opposition critics further suggested that the public works minister at the time, Alfonso Gagliano, whom Chrétien had praised as a great patriot, was not just a mere bystander to questionable contacts associated with the sponsorship program that Fraser had identified. In response to the public outrage, Chrétien argued in speech in Winnipeg that all this was necessary to stop Quebec separatism and justified by the results, stating that: "Perhaps there was a few million dollars that might have been stolen in the process. It is possible. But how many millions of dollars have we saved the country because we have re-established the stability of Canada as a united country? If somebody has stolen the money, they will face the courts. But I will not apologize to Canadians." Chrétien's argument that he had nothing to apologize for in regards to the sponsorship program, and his apparent condoning of corruption as justified by the results of saving Canada fared poorly with the Canadian public, which increasingly started to perceive the prime minister as an autocratic leader with a thuggish streak. A poll taken later in May 2002 showed that over half of Canadians believed that the Chrétien government was corrupt. The Sponsorship Scandal would tarnish Chrétien's reputation only a few years after he left office, and contributed to the Liberals losing their majority government in 2004 and losing power altogether in 2006.

=== Chrétien and Martin: Liberal Party infighting ===
Relations between Chrétien and Martin were frequently strained, and Martin was reportedly angling to replace Chrétien as early as 1997. Martin had long hoped that Chrétien would just retire at the end of his second term, thereby allowing him to win the Liberal leadership, and were greatly disappointed in January 2000 when Chrétien's communications director Françoise Ducros had fired "a shot across the bow" by confirming what had been strongly hinted at since the summer of 1999 in an announcement to the caucus that Chrétien would seek a third term.

Chrétien was due to face a leadership review in February 2002, but the Liberal national executive, which was controlled by partisans of Paul Martin, agreed to Chrétien's request in early January 2001 that the leadership review be pushed back to February 2003. In agreeing to this request, Martin believed that this was the quid pro quo for allowing Chrétien a decent interval to retire with dignity sometime in 2002, an interpretation that Chrétien did not hold.

==== Rebellion and resignation ====
By early 2002, the long-simmering feud with Martin came to a head. A particular concern that had badly strained relations between the prime minister and the finance minister by early 2002 was Martin's control of the Liberal Party apparatus, especially his control over the issuing of membership forms, which he reserved largely for his own supporters. In January 2002, Brian Tobin complained to Chrétien that the Liberal Party machinery had been "captured" by Martin's followers to the extent that it was now virtually impossible for anyone else to sign up their own followers. This posed a major problem for Chrétien as the Liberals were due to hold a leadership review in February 2003. However, it was still quite possible that Chrétien would win the review by a slim margin.

In January 2002, an incident occurred which was to greatly damage Chrétien's relations with the Liberal caucus. After Chrétien reorganized the Cabinet in late January 2002, Liberal MP Carolyn Bennett criticised Chrétien at a caucus meeting for not appointing more women to the Cabinet. Chrétien exploded with rage at Bennett's criticism, saying that as a mere backbencher she did not have the right to criticise the prime minister in front of the caucus, and attacked her with such fury that Bennett collapsed in tears. In February 2002, reflecting a growing number of Liberal MPs' displeasure with Chrétien, the Liberal caucus elected the outspoken pro-Martin MP Stan Keyes (who had already openly mused in 2001 about how it was time for Chrétien to go) as their chairman, who defeated pro-Chrétien MP Steve Mahoney. Chrétien had expected Mahoney to win, and was reported to be shocked when he learned of Keyes's victory, which now gave Martin more control of the caucus.

In late May 2002, Chrétien tried to curtail Martin's campaign for the leadership of the party by delivering a lecture to Cabinet to stop raising money for leadership bids within the Liberal Party. At what was described as a "stormy" Cabinet meeting on May 30, 2002, Chrétien stated that he intended to serve out his entire term, and ordered the end of all leadership fundraising. Martin left his cabinet on June 2, 2002. Martin claimed that Chrétien dismissed him from Cabinet, while Chrétien said that Martin had resigned. In his memoirs, Chrétien wrote that he regretted not having fired Martin a few years earlier.

Martin's departure generated a severe backlash from Martin's supporters, who controlled much of the party machinery, and all signs indicated that they were prepared to oust Chrétien at a leadership review in February 2003. To win the leadership review, Chrétien formed a team in early June 2002 comprising his close associates John Rae, David Collenette, Jean Carle, and David Smith who were ordered to sign up as many pro-Chrétien ("Chrétienist") Liberals as possible for the leadership review. The open split, which was covered extensively on national media, increasingly painted Chrétien as a lame duck. During the summer of 2002, a number of backbencher Liberal MPs associated with Martin started to openly criticise Chrétien's leadership, calling on him to resign now or suffer the humiliation of losing the leadership review. Chrétien asked Jim Karygiannis, who had been so effective in signing up supporters for him in 1990 to repeat that performance, only to be told by Karygiannis that Chrétien had never rewarded him by appointing him to the Cabinet as he asked for many times over the years, had not even returned his phone calls to set up a meeting to discuss his possible appointment to the Cabinet and that he was now a Martin man. Karygiannis then called a press conference on July 13, 2002, where he called for Chrétien to retire "with dignity", rather than risk losing a potentially divisive leadership review and avoid having his career end that way.

After less than half the caucus committed to support him in August 2002 by signing a letter indicating their support for the prime minister in the up-coming leadership review, Chrétien announced that he would not lead the party into the next election, and set his resignation date for February 2004. Martin was not happy with the 2004 departure date, preferring that Chrétien retire at the end of 2002, but considered it better if Chrétien were to retire than having to defeat him at the 2003 leadership review, which would have been more divisive and would have established the ominous precedent of a prime minister being ousted by his own party for no other reason other that someone else wanted the job. Due to mounting pressure from the Martin camp, Chrétien no longer saw his February 2004 resignation date as tenable. His final sitting in the House of Commons took place on November 6, 2003. He made an emotional farewell to the party on November 13 at the 2003 Liberal leadership convention. The following day, Martin was elected his successor. On December 12, 2003, Chrétien formally resigned as prime minister, handing power over to Martin. Chrétien joined the law firm, Heenan Blaikie on January 5, 2004, as counsel. The firm announced he would work out of its Ottawa offices four days per week and make a weekly visit to the Montreal office. In early 2004, there occurred much in-fighting within the Liberal Party with several Liberal MPs associated with Chrétien such as Sheila Copps and Charles Caccia losing their nomination battles against Martin loyalists.

== See also ==
- Premierships of Pierre Trudeau
- Premiership of Paul Martin
- Premiership of Stephen Harper
- Premiership of Justin Trudeau
- Premiership of Mark Carney

Canadian federal premierships
Preceded by Kim Campbell	Jean Chrétien; 1993–2003	Succeeded by Paul Martin
