= Premiership of Paul Martin =

Period of the Government of Canada from 2003 to 2006

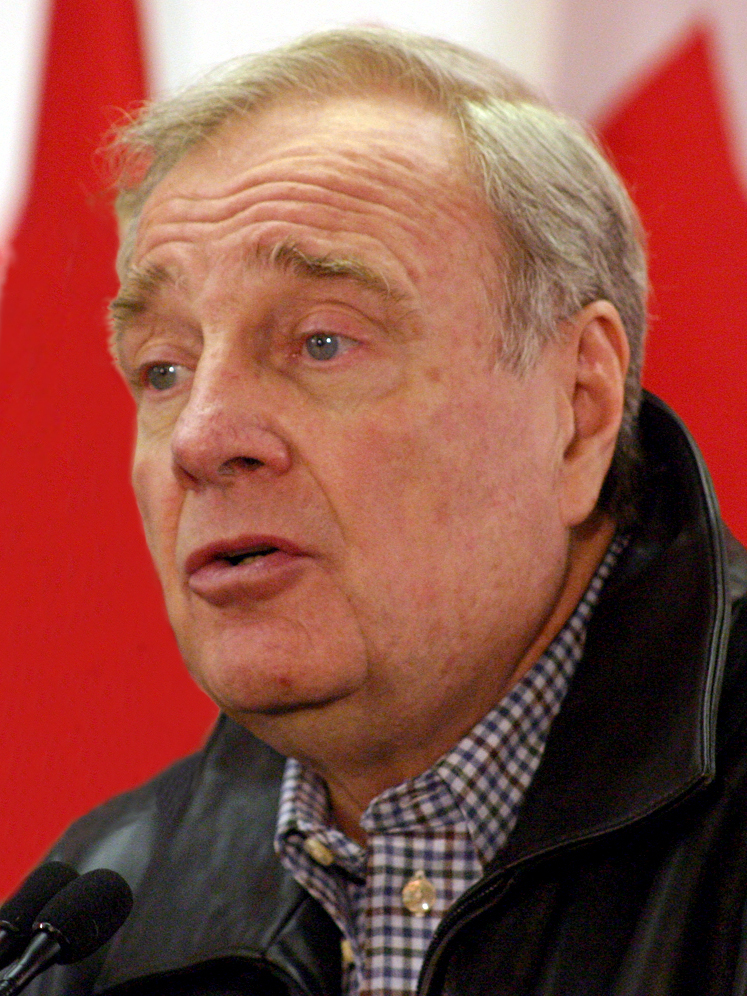
- Martin in 2006
- Premiership of Paul Martin; December 12, 2003 – February 6, 2006
- Monarch: Elizabeth II
- Prime Minister: Paul Martin
- Cabinet: 27th Canadian Ministry
- Party: Liberal
- Election: 2004
- Appointed by: Adrienne Clarkson
- Seat: Office of the Prime Minister
- Constituency: LaSalle—Émard

The premiership of Paul Martin began on December 12, 2003, when the first Cabinet headed by Paul Martin was sworn in by Governor General Adrienne Clarkson. Martin was invited to form the 27th Canadian Ministry and become Prime Minister of Canada after he succeeded Prime Minister Jean Chrétien as leader of the Liberal Party in the 2003 leadership election. Martin advised the governor general to dissolve Parliament and trigger the 2004 federal election, where he led his Liberals to win a plurality of seats in the House of Commons of Canada, forming a minority government. In the 2006 federal election, Martin's Liberals lost power to the Conservative Party led by Stephen Harper. On February 6, 2006, Martin resigned as prime minister and was succeeded by Harper, who formed a minority government.

== Background ==
The son of former senator and secretary of state for external affairs Paul Martin Sr., Martin was a lawyer from Ontario before he became president and the chief executive officer of Canada Steamship Lines in 1973. He held that position until his election as a member of Parliament for the Montreal riding of LaSalle—Émard in 1988. Martin ran for leader of the Liberal Party in 1990, losing to Jean Chrétien. Martin would become Chrétien's longtime rival for the leadership of the party, though was appointed his minister of finance after the Liberal victory in the 1993 federal election. Martin oversaw many changes in the financial structure of the Canadian government, and his policies had a direct effect on eliminating the country's chronic fiscal deficit by drastically cutting spending and reforming various programs including social services. In 2002, Martin resigned as finance minister when tensions with Chrétien reached their peak. Martin initially prepared to challenge Chrétien's leadership; however, Chrétien announced his intention of retiring, which triggered the November 2003 leadership election. Martin easily won the leadership and was sworn in as prime minister in December.

In the 2004 federal election, the Liberal Party retained power as a minority government, losing its majority due to the sponsorship scandal that began to develop in the late 1990s. Martin's government reached an agreement with Canada's provinces on increased funding for healthcare, negotiated the Atlantic Accord with the governments of Nova Scotia and Newfoundland and Labrador, signed the Kelowna Accord to improve the living conditions of indigenous peoples, and legalized same-sex marriage. In 2005, the opposition parties in the House of Commons passed a motion of no confidence contending that Martin's government was corrupt after the Gomery Commission released new details regarding the sponsorship scandal, which triggered the 2006 federal election. Martin and the Liberals were defeated by the newly unified Conservative Party led by Stephen Harper, ending over 12 years of Liberal rule.

Shortly after the defeat, Martin stepped down as Liberal leader and declined to seek re-election in 2008. Evaluations of Martin's prime ministership have been mixed, whereas his tenure as finance minister is viewed more favourably. Now seen as a global diplomat, Martin continues to contribute on the international arena through a variety of initiatives such as Incentives for Global Health, the not-for-profit behind the Health Impact Fund, where he serves as a member of the advisory board. He also sits as an advisor to Canada's Ecofiscal Commission.

== Tenure (2003–2006) ==
=== Majority government and sponsorship controversy ===
On December 12, 2003, Martin was appointed by then-governor general Adrienne Clarkson as the 21st prime minister of Canada. When sworn in as prime minister, Martin held the flag that flew on Parliament Hill when the elder Martin died. Both father and son had served as Cabinet ministers and contested the Liberal leadership on multiple occasions; their attempts from 1948 to 1990 were unsuccessful. Martin's election as leader and becoming prime minister was described as fulfilling a family dream. Both also earned the honorific prefix The Right Honourable. One difference between them was that Paul Sr. was one of the most left-wing members of the party, while Paul Jr. is considered on the right-wing.

When he was sworn in, Martin's new cabinet retained only half the ministers from Chrétien's government, a noteworthy break in tradition from previous instances where a retiring prime minister handed over power to his successor as party leader. Martin and his supporters exercised control over the riding nomination process, breaking with the precedent to automatically sign the nomination papers of backbenchers and former ministers who wanted to run for reelection. While these were signs of open party infighting, this had little impact on Martin's record popularity, with several pundits suggesting that the cabinet change was meant to present a new government different from Chrétien's ten-year tenure. Martin declined to appoint leadership contestants John Manley and Sheila Copps to cabinet.

Martin and the Liberals were adversely affected by a report from Auditor General Sheila Fraser on February 9, 2004, indicating that sponsorship contracts designed to increase the federal government's status in Quebec resulted in little to no work done. Many of the agencies had Liberal ties, and roughly $100 million of the $250 million in program spending went missing. The scandal hurt Martin's popularity, especially in Quebec, where Bloc Québécois leader Gilles Duceppe even accused Martin of planning to widen the St. Lawrence seaway to benefit his own Canada Steamship Lines. The scandal also cast skepticism on Martin's recommendations for Cabinet appointments, prompting speculation Martin was simply ridding the government of Chrétien's supporters to distance the Liberals from the scandal. Martin acknowledged that there was political direction but denied involvement in, or knowledge of, the sponsorship contracts. He had a judicial inquiry called to investigate what came to be known as the Sponsorship Scandal, and nominated John Gomery to head it.

During his term, Martin appeared as himself in a fictional, comedic context in several programs, including an episode of the CTV sitcom Corner Gas in 2006, and also in the CBC mockumentary series Jimmy MacDonald's Canada in 2005.

==== 2004 federal election ====
The Liberals were facing a new united Conservative Party led by Stephen Harper, while the Bloc Québécois and NDP were also buoyed by the Sponsorship Scandal. Martin advised Governor General Adrienne Clarkson to call an election for June 28, 2004.

The Liberals were also hampered by their inability to raise campaign money competitively after Chrétien passed a bill in 2003 that banned corporate donations, even though the Liberals had enjoyed by far the lion's share of this funding due to the then-divided opposition parties. It has been suggested that Chrétien, who had done nothing about election financing for his 10 years in office, could be seen as the idealist as he retired, while his rival and successor Martin would have the burden of having to fight an election under the strict new rules.

An unpopular provincial budget by Liberal premier Dalton McGuinty, who broke a pledge not to raise taxes, hurt the federal party's numbers in Ontario, as did a weak performance from Martin in the leaders' debates. The Conservatives soon took the lead, prompting some predictions of an imminent Harper government. The Liberals managed to narrow the gap and eventually regain momentum. Martin was successful in winning a plurality of seats to continue as the government, though they were now in a minority situation, the first since Joe Clark's tenure in 1979–80.

=== Minority government ===
The Martin government faced combined challenges from Quebec separatism and general hostility arising from the Sponsorship Scandal. The first test of the Liberal minority came following the Speech from the throne on October 5, 2004. The Bloc Québécois moved an amendment to the speech challenging the government over provincial jurisdiction. The Conservatives supported the amendment, but the NDP opposed it. Collapse of the government on the confidence vote was averted after Martin called Harper and reached a last-minute deal watering down the motion's wording. The government faced another hurdle when the Conservatives announced their own plan to move an amendment to the speech. Harper denied that the Tories intended to bring down the government. The fall of the government was averted for the second time after the Liberals reached a deal with the opposition parties. Don Boudria, the Liberals' Chrétien-era House leader, likened the brinkmanship in the first few weeks of the 38th Parliament to a game of Russian roulette.

==== Economic policy ====
Martin invested heavily in Quebec, for example with the Bombardier Inc. C series project, which was later taken over by Airbus when the owner got into financial difficulties and called the Airbus A220. By June 2005 Martin gave the Federation of Canadian Municipalities a GST rebate and was about to supply to them a portion of the federal gasoline tax; the programme was called "New Deal for Cities and Communities". This was a left-over of his time as minister of finance, spurred by continued carping by academics, some of whom did not hesitate to note in 2004 that "[u]nlike the federal and provincial governments, municipalities cannot borrow for operating purposes; they can only do so for capital expenditures."

===== Healthcare funding =====
At the First Ministers' Meeting of September 13–15, 2004, Martin and the provincial premiers reached an agreement on increased funding for healthcare. This 10-year plan outlined $18 billion in increased transfers to the provinces over 6 years, notably through increases in the CHT:

- The CHT was to be increased by $3 billion in 2004-05 and $2 billion in 2005-06;
- A new CHT base set at $19 billion starting in 2005–06, greater than suggested in the Romanow Report;
- An escalation factor set at 6% starting in 2006–07.

===== Equalization =====
Martin also introduced changes to the equalization program, under which the Federal Government is constitutionally obligated to redistribute federal revenue to provinces having less ability to raise revenues through taxation than wealthier provinces. The goal is to ensure uniformity of public service provision across the nation. This was received well in "have-not" provinces, but Nova Scotia and Newfoundland and Labrador sought to retain income from natural resources on federal marine territory that would generally be taken, or 'clawed back', by the federal treasury in lieu of equalization payments. In the 2004 federal election campaign, Harper provided a written promise that Newfoundland and Labrador and Nova Scotia under a Conservative government would receive 100 percent of the revenue generated from their natural resources without an equalization clawback, a promise he reneged upon when elected Prime Minister. NDP leader Jack Layton followed suit soon after with a similar guarantee, and later Martin promised that under a Liberal government both provinces would receive the same deal, except only for oil resources. Negotiations over the agreement were harsh, with Newfoundland and Labrador Premier Danny Williams at one point ordering all Canadian flags removed from provincial government buildings in December 2004. The dispute was resolved when the federal government agreed to Martin's original campaign promise.

===== 2005 budget =====
The 2005 federal budget was presented in the House of Commons on February 23, 2005. The budget included an array of new spending for the Armed Forces, the environment and a national child-care program.

Public hearings of the Gomery Commission inquiry into the sponsorship scandal involving alleged kickbacks and "donations" from Quebec advertising agencies and corporations to Liberal Party operatives led to a drop in the Liberal Party's popularity. The security of the minority government came under fire as the Conservatives threatened to force an election by use of their "opposition day," when they get to set the Parliament's agenda. The Conservatives would use this time to hold a vote of no confidence in order to topple Martin's government. To avoid this, Martin removed all opposition days from the schedule and made a televised appearance on April 21, 2005, to attempt to gain support from the Canadian people to let the inquiry run its course before an election was called. In the rebuttal speeches by the opposition party leaders, Layton offered his party's support provided that they were given major concessions in the budget such as canceling the proposed corporate tax cuts. Days later, the Liberals took the NDP up on their offer and negotiated tax cut deferments and new spending initiatives. Among the new commitments was aid for Sudan, which Sudan's officials turned down as Martin did not consult them about it beforehand. This aid was attacked as a perceived attempt to win the vote of a single independent MP, former Liberal David Kilgour. Kilgour nevertheless voted against the government.

In May, Parliament passed a motion asking one of its committees to express a lack of confidence in the government. The Liberals dismissed this as a procedural matter, causing some to accuse them of governing unlawfully by ignoring parliamentary tradition. The Conservatives and Bloc interpreted it as a vote of no confidence, and they combined their votes to shut down the House of Commons early for two days in a row. The Speaker of the House of Commons later ruled in favour of the Liberal stance.

On May 17, 2005, MP Belinda Stronach crossed the floor from the Conservative Party and joined the Liberal Party to become Minister of Human Resources and Skills Development. Martin claimed Stronach's move was due to concerns over the direction the Conservative Party was taking; others accused Stronach of political opportunism. The event changed the balance of power in the House of Commons in favour of the government. This, and the support of independent MP Chuck Cadman, caused a tie during a May 2005 confidence vote, meaning that Peter Milliken, Speaker of the House needed to cast the deciding vote. He voted with the government, following the tradition that the Speaker votes to continue debate, and that allowed the budget to pass through the House on May 19, 2005.

==== Social policy ====
Same-sex marriage proved to be a defining issue of Martin's mandate. Martin opposed same-sex marriage in a 1999 vote on the issue along with a majority of MPs, but changed his stance on the issue in 2004, citing recent court rulings and his personal belief that same-sex marriage was primarily a human rights issue. In the midst of various court rulings in 2003 and 2004 that allowed for the legalization of same-sex marriages in seven provinces and one territory, the government proposed a bill to legalize same-sex marriage across Canada. The House of Commons passed the Civil Marriage Act in late June 2005 in a late-night, last-minute vote before Parliament closed down, the Senate passed it in July 2005, and it received Royal Assent on July 20 of the same year. This made Canada the fourth country in the world to allow same-sex marriages.

In November 2005, the Martin government reached a historic consensus with Canada's provinces, territories, First Nations, Métis and Inuit. Known as the Kelowna Accord, it aimed to eliminate the gaps between Aboriginal and non-Aboriginal Canadians in health, education, housing and economic opportunity.

==== Foreign relations ====
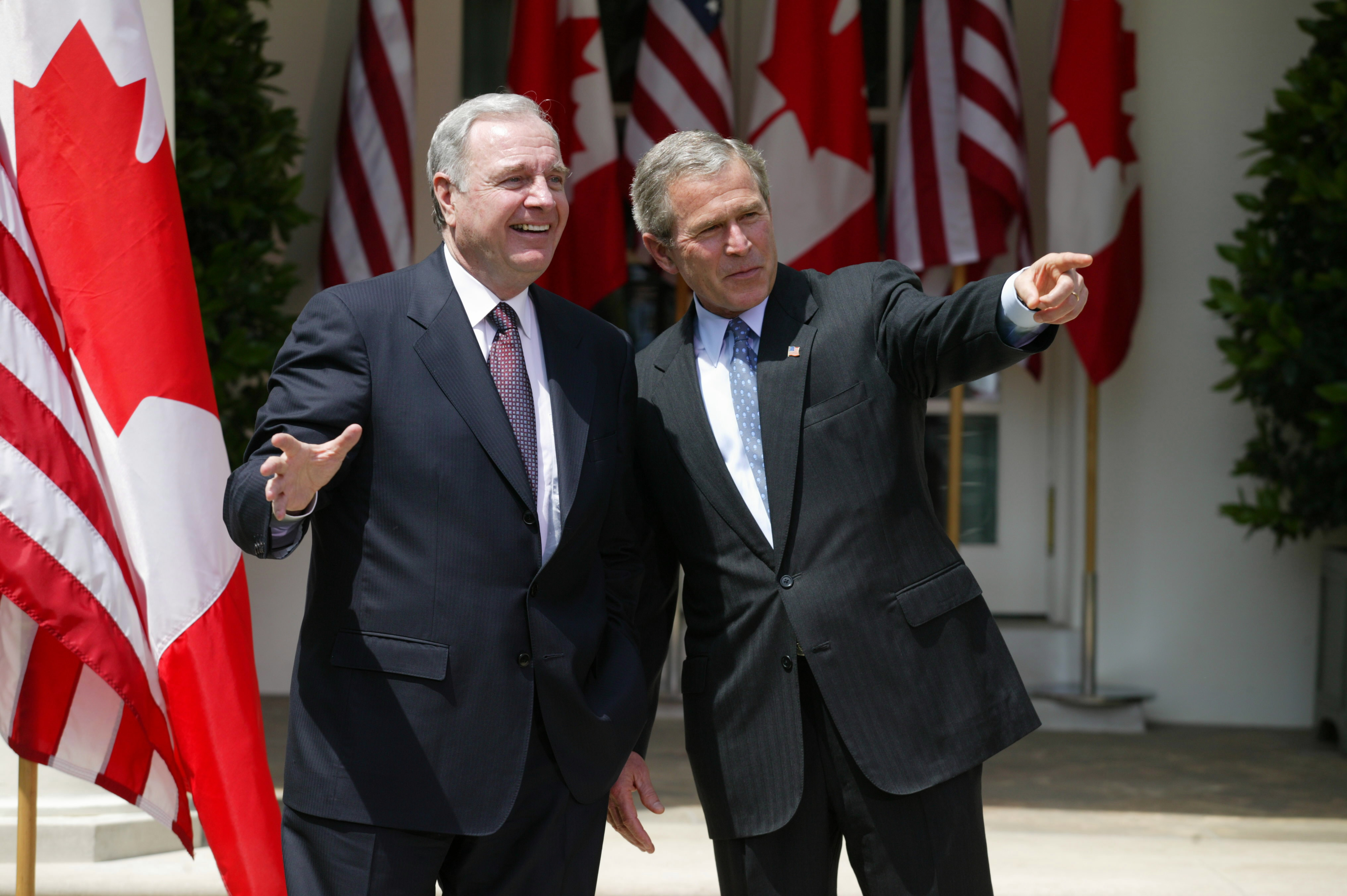
Martin alongside U.S. president George W. Bush, April 30, 2004

On February 24, 2005, Foreign Affairs Minister Pierre Pettigrew told the House of Commons that Canada would not participate in the American National Missile Defense Program, and that he expected to be consulted in the case of a missile being launched over Canadian airspace. Martin's decision met with much praise, but others saw that the government was distancing itself from the U.S. His government continued to cooperate with the United States on border control, refugee claimants, and defense, and he appointed seasoned Liberal politician Frank McKenna as Canada's ambassador to Washington.

Martin was criticized for failing to reach a foreign-aid target of 0.7 percent of GDP, most notably by Bono of Irish rock group U2 (who claimed that he was going to "kick [Martin's] butt" over the issue). Martin later responded that, in his view, many foreign leaders had made pledges that were too fanciful and that he would only commit to targets that he knew his government could be held accountable for.

Martin became involved in a diplomatic row with the United States administration after accusing, with Bill Clinton, the US of not listening to global environmental concerns. Martin rejected US Ambassador David Wilkins's rebuke and said he was standing up for Canada's interests over softwood and other issues.

Martin promoted the expansion of the G8 into a larger group of twenty nations, G20, whose inaugural chairman was himself. He also forged a closer relationship with the People's Republic of China by announcing the strategic partnership initiative during PRC President Hu Jintao's state visit to Canada in September 2005.

==== Appointment of Governor General ====
On August 4, 2005, the government announced that Martin had advised Queen Elizabeth II to appoint Michaëlle Jean as governor general. The reception to the appointment was mixed: some applauded the move, while accusations that her husband had both dined with former members of the terrorist organization FLQ and been supportive of Quebec separatism surprised others. Subsequent to her appointment, she reaffirmed her commitment to federalism and the issue died down.

==== Fall of government ====
The first volume of the Gomery Report, released on November 1, 2005, cleared Martin of any wrongdoing while placing some blame for the scandal on Chrétien for lack of oversight, although it acknowledged that Chrétien had no knowledge of the scandal. On June 26, 2008, Chrétien was cleared of all allegations of involvement in the scandal.

A Canadian judge issued a gag order that barred Canadian media from covering the hearings of the Gomery Inquiry. Despite this, leaked information circulated after being published in an American blog Captain's Quarters.

After the Gomery findings, NDP leader Jack Layton notified the Liberals of conditions for the NDP's continued support; the terms of these conditions are unclear, but the two parties were unable to come to an agreement. An opposition proposal to schedule an election for February 2006 in return for passing several pieces of legislation was also unrealized. The Conservatives, supported by the other two opposition parties (the NDP and Bloc Québécois), introduced a motion of non confidence against the Martin government. The motion passed on November 28 by a count of 171–133, defeating the government, after which the governor general issued election writs for a vote to be held on January 23, 2006.

Some commentators described Martin's tenure as prime minister as unfocused and indecisive, with the Canadian correspondent of The Economist reporting that he was being called "Mr. Dithers" in Ottawa.

==== 2006 federal election ====
Prior to the campaign and upon dropping of the writs, opinion polling indicated the Liberals were ahead of the Conservatives by 2–10% popular support (November 30, 2005: Liberals 35%, Conservatives 30%). But the Liberal lead did not last. They did not plan much serious campaigning during December, allowing the Conservatives to take the initiative in rolling out policy ideas. Several early gaffes were picked up by an unsympathetic media. One notable gaffe was Liberal Party strategist Scott Reid's suggestion that parents might buy beer and popcorn with the Conservatives' child care subsidy, although Martin declined to apologize. Martin was also criticized for portraying himself as the defender of Canadian unity; some opponents said that the election was not a referendum while others pointed to the Sponsorship Scandal.

Near the end of December, the Liberals were rocked by a Royal Canadian Mounted Police criminal investigation into the leaking of news of a federal tax change for income trusts. This again brought the Sponsorship Scandal to public attention at a time when Martin planned to make important policy announcements. Under constant campaign pressure by all opposition parties casting Martin and the Liberals as corrupt, Liberal support fell to as low as 26% in early January 2006. The decline was not halted even by a glossy election pledge booklet.

Martin did not put in a strong performance during the televised campaign debates. While appearing passionate in his message, he stuttered in making statements and appeared somewhat flustered. During one debate, Martin made a surprise pledge that he would eliminate the notwithstanding clause; the Conservatives pointed out that this was not one of the announced Liberal campaign promises.

In an attempt to sway voter sentiment in the final two weeks of the campaign, the Liberals prepared a series of attack ads. One unreleased ad was seen widely as disrespectful of the military and it not only overshadowed the other ads but also forced Martin to defend it instead of releasing new policies. During the last week, Martin was forced to defend Harper after the latter was called a separatist by Canadian Auto Workers union leader Buzz Hargrove. In another tactic similar to the 2004 campaign, Hargrove urged all progressive voters to unite under the Liberal banner in English Canada and the Bloc Québécois in Quebec to stop the Conservatives, hoping to attract voters who were leaning towards the NDP, but New Democrat leader Jack Layton responded by focusing his attacks on Liberal corruption.

In the end, the Conservatives won a plurality of support and seats, finishing 31 seats short of a majority. The Liberals held their base of support in Ontario, with 54 seats of the 103 in the province. The Liberals lost a number of seats in Quebec, winning only 13 of the 75 seats in the province, down from 21 in 2004, while the Conservatives won 10 seats there. The Liberals did not improve their standings in the Western provinces, winning only 14 of the 92 seats, the same number as in 2004.

Shortly after midnight on January 24, 2006, after it became clear that the Conservatives were on their way to a plurality, Martin conceded defeat. (Near the end of the 2004 election, Martin and Harper both pledged that they would not form a government unless they won a plurality of seats.) Martin surprised many by announcing his resignation as party leader, saying "I will continue to represent with pride the people of LaSalle—Émard, but I will not take our party into another election as leader." The next day, Martin officially informed Governor General Michaëlle Jean of his intention to resign as prime minister. Jean asked Harper to form a government later that day. Martin remained as prime minister until the Harper minority government was sworn on February 6, 2006.

=== Supreme Court appointments ===
Martin chose the following jurists to be appointed as justices of the Supreme Court of Canada by the Governor General:

- Rosalie Abella (October 4, 2004 – July 1, 2021)
- Louise Charron (October 4, 2004 – August 30, 2011)

== See also ==
- Premierships of Pierre Trudeau
- Premiership of Jean Chrétien
- Premiership of Stephen Harper
- Premiership of Justin Trudeau
- Premiership of Mark Carney

Canadian federal premierships
Preceded by Jean Chrétien	Paul Martin; 2003–2006	Succeeded by Stephen Harper
