= Premiership of Mark Carney =

Government of Canada from 2025

- Carney in 2026
- Premiership of Mark Carney; March 14, 2025 – present
- Monarch: Charles III
- Prime Minister: Mark Carney
- Cabinet: 30th Canadian Ministry
- Party: Liberal
- Election: 2025
- Appointed by: Mary Simon
- Seat: Office of the Prime Minister
- Constituency: Not in parliament (March–April 2025); Nepean (April 2025–present)

Mark Carney's current tenure as prime minister of Canada began on March 14, 2025, when he accepted an invitation from Mary Simon, the governor general of Canada, to form the 30th Canadian Ministry and become the 24th Prime Minister of Canada. He succeeded Prime Minister Justin Trudeau as leader of the Liberal Party in the 2025 leadership election after he announced his intent to resign as the party leader and prime minister. Shortly after taking office, Carney advised the governor general to dissolve Parliament and trigger the 2025 federal election, where he led his Liberals to win a plurality of seats in the House of Commons of Canada, forming a minority government.

Upon taking the oath of office, Carney became the first Canadian prime minister born in any of its territories (as opposed to provinces) and the third born west of Ontario, after Joe Clark and Kim Campbell. He is the second prime minister to have earned a PhD, after William Lyon Mackenzie King. Additionally, he is the first to have never served in prior elected office, and the first since John Turner not to be sitting in the House of Commons at time of appointment. In his first act as prime minister, Carney signed a prime ministerial directive to end the consumer carbon tax by April 1, while ensuring that April's carbon rebate continues. The directive was affirmed by an order in council signed by Governor General Mary Simon. Carney's first foreign visits were to France and the United Kingdom on March 17 to strengthen mutual security and sovereignty. The 2025 Speech from the Throne was delivered by King Charles III as part of his 2025 royal tour of Canada, outlining the government's first priorities following the election.

Carney's appointment occurred against the backdrop of Donald Trump's victory in the 2024 United States presidential election and his threats to impose sweeping tariffs on Canada and even annex it. This period coincided with a dramatic turnaround in the Liberal Party's fortunes: the party had been more than 20 points behind in the polls when Trudeau announced his resignation, but soon after Carney was sworn in as prime minister, the polling gap had been eliminated, and the Liberals were in the lead, putting them in striking distance of a majority government. Analysts described the scale of their political turnaround as having "little precedent" in Canadian history. After multiple floor-crossings between late 2025 and early 2026, the Carney government achieved majority status in April 2026 (after by-elections were held to fill several vacant seats).

== Background ==
=== 2025 Liberal Party of Canada leadership election ===
On January 6, 2025, Trudeau announced his resignation as Prime Minister and leader of the Liberal Party. On January 16, 2025, Carney formally announced his intent to run in the leadership election and become Liberal Party leader. On March 9, 2025, he won the leadership election with 85.9% of the overall vote, becoming the next leader of the party and Prime Minister, succeeding Trudeau. Trudeau stayed on as Prime Minister until his formal resignation in the early morning of March 14, 2025, prior to Carney's swearing in later that morning.

At the time of his appointment, Carney did not hold a seat in the House of Commons, similar to the previous premierships of Charles Tupper, Arthur Meighen, and John Turner; all three individuals lacked seats in the House of Commons at the time of their initial appointment as Prime Minister. Carney would later win the seat of in Nepean in the 2025 federal election. Upon taking the oath of office, he became the first Canadian prime minister born in any of the territories and the third born west of Ontario (after Joe Clark and Kim Campbell). He is the second prime minister to have earned a PhD, after William Lyon Mackenzie King. Additionally, he is the first to have never served in prior elected office, and the first since John Turner not to be sitting in the House of Commons at time of appointment. Before taking office, Carney placed his Brookfield Asset Management stocks in a blind trust.

=== 2025 federal election ===
Ternary plot of 2025 Canadian federal election results by riding, each identified by party colours

Carney was expected to call a federal parliamentary election for late April or early May 2025, ahead of the required election date in October. On March 22, the Liberal Party announced that Carney would contest the riding of Nepean, located within Ottawa, in the election; ridings in Alberta had been floated given his personal connection to the province, particularly Edmonton, as were safe Liberal seats in Toronto and Ottawa. On March 23, Carney visited Governor General Mary Simon and asked to dissolve parliament and call an election for April 28. Carney and the Liberal Party subsequently won the election, defeating Pierre Poilievre and the Conservative Party and forming their fourth consecutive government. The Liberal Party won 169 seats, falling three seats short of a majority government, thereby forming a minority government.

== Cabinet ==
Following the March 14, 2025, Rideau Hall swearing in ceremony by Governor General Mary Simon, Mark Carney, was invited to form his Cabinet and to become the 24th Prime Minister of Canada.

After the 2025 federal election, Carney reshuffled his cabinet on May 13, 2025.

== Parliament ==
Between late 2025 and early 2026, multiple opposition MPs crossed the floor to the Liberal caucus, helping push the government towards majority status; they included: Conservative MPs Chris d'Entremont, Matt Jeneroux, Michael Ma and Marilyn Gladu, and New Democratic MP Lori Idlout. Carney's attendance in Question Period has been significantly less than Trudeau's during his first year in office. After the government achieved a majority in the House of Commons in April 2026, Government House Leader Steven MacKinnon moved to change the standing orders for lower house committees, with Liberal MPs holding a majority in those committees. The party also gained a seat following the 2026 Chicoutimi—Le Fjord federal by-election.

== Domestic policy ==
=== Taxation and finance ===
Shortly after being sworn in as Prime Minister, Carney's government approved an order in council to immediately reduce the consumer price of carbon to $0 starting on April 1, 2025, thereby effectively terminating the consumer portion of Canada's carbon pricing policy. The final carbon rebate payment was nonetheless issued as scheduled. Carney stated the policy had become too "divisive" among the Canadian public, resulting in the necessity for it to be removed. The scheme was originally implemented in 2018 through the Greenhouse Gas Pollution Pricing Act, which was passed during Trudeau's first term. The industrial levy on carbon was unaffected.

After the recall of Parliament following the election, Carney introduced legislation to lower the bottom marginal income tax rate from 15% to 14%. The Liberals estimated that this would save two-income household $840 annually. Another tax change proposed by the bill was the temporary elimination of the Goods and Services Tax for first time home buyers. Both changes were part of the Liberal platform in the preceding election. The House of Commons approved a ways and means motion allowing the tax changes to effect before the enactment of the bill, and the income tax cut took effect on the following Canada Day, consistent with Carney's pre-election pledge. In June 2025, the government dropped the digital services tax in order "to advance broader trade negotiations with the United States."

In June, Parliament passed the One Canadian Economy Act with Conservative support, but the bill drew criticism from Indigenous groups.

In July 2025, finance minister François-Philippe Champagne asked fellow cabinet ministers to find savings in their departments, with the goal of a 15% government operational spending cut by 2029. Champagne announced in October that the government would establish a Financial Crimes Agency in 2026, along with a "national anti-fraud strategy". In early 2026, it was announced that the government would cut programs including in science, tourism, and foreign aid.

In September 2025, procurement minister Joël Lightbound announced that the government would allow Canada Post to phase out door-to-door service in favour of community mailboxes, impacting roughly 4,000 addresses. It will also close many rural post offices. In February 2026, the government gave Canada Post an over $1 billion loan, following a request from the Crown corporation amid financial difficulties.

Carney's 2025 federal budget was narrowly passed by parliament on 18 November in a 170–168 vote, avoiding a snap election. Carney's government introduced a new capital budgeting framework in the 2025 budget. Operational spending will be distinguished from capital expenditures, and the budgeting cycle will be revised with a budget tabled in autumn and an economic statement released in the spring.

In January 2026, the government announced the "Canada Groceries and Essentials Benefit", which will increase quarterly goods and services tax (GST) payments by 25 percent over five years. It was also announced that a one-time GST top-up of 50 percent would be implemented in June 2026. The benefit will cost the government $12.4 billion over five years, according to the Parliamentary Budget Officer. Before the 2026 spring economic statement, Carney announced the Canada Strong Fund, a sovereign wealth fund. Transport minister MacKinnon has stated his openness to privatizing and selling Canada's seaports and airports.

=== Immigration ===
In 2025, Carney campaigned to address "unsustainable" immigration to Canada, which had risen to approximately 500,000 a year during the premiership of Justin Trudeau. As per the Immigration Levels Plan 2025–2027, Canada's overall planned permanent resident admission targets are 395,000 in 2025, 380,000 in 2026 and 365,000 in 2027. The government set levels for temporary residents in the 2025-27 Levels Plan at 673,650 in 2025, 516,600 in 2026 and 543,600 in 2027.

=== Energy ===
Carney voiced support for a new oil pipeline to the West Coast and a proposed C$16.5 billion ($12 billion) carbon capture system for the Alberta oil sands. In November 2025, Carney reached a deal with Danielle Smith to build an oil pipeline from Alberta to the British Columbia Coast. Opposed by British Columbia's David Eby, most local First Nations, and some Liberal caucus members, the memorandum of understanding (MOU) exempts the project from climate legislation such as the greenhouse gas emissions cap, but outlines that Alberta will invest in a carbon capture system for the Athabasca oil sands. Following the signing of the MOU, Steven Guilbeault, former minister of environment and climate change, resigned from Cabinet while remaining a member of the government caucus. In May 2026, Carney and Smith agreed on a carbon pricing system and a timeline for pipeline construction.

In May 2026, Carney announced a new national electricity strategy that aims to double Canada's electricity grid capacity by 2050 through a mix of clean energy and natural gas. The government will review and amend Trudeau's Clean Electricity Regulations and will train more than 100,000 highly skilled workers.

=== Environmentalism ===
In 2025, Carney supported the Trudeau government's EV mandate, requiring hybrids and electric vehicles to make up 20% of sales by 2026 and 100% by 2035. However, by September 2025, Carney announced a pause and will launch a 60-day review of the EV mandate. In February 2026, he announced that the government would remove the mandate in favour of a rebate that offers $5,000 when Canadians buy battery electric and fuel EVs, and up to $2,500 for plug-in hybrids during a five-year period. Carney also lowered the EV sales mandate. He also announced investments in improving and expanding the country's EV charging network infrastructure.

=== Labour relations ===
Carney's government was criticized by the Canadian Union of Public Employees (CUPE) for abolishing the position of Minister of Labour. The powers, duties and functions of that position now reside with the Minister of Jobs and Families.

A few hours after the 2025 Air Canada flight attendants strike began, the Minister of Jobs and Families, Patty Hajdu, announced that she had exercised her right under Section 107 of the Canada Labour Code to direct the Canada Industrial Relations Board (CIRB) to force arbitration and end the strike. She further explained that it would take 24 to 48 hours for the board to issue a back-to-work order, and that Air Canada had indicated it would need five to ten days to resume normal operations. Striking flight attendants on the picket lines were furious at Hajdu upon learning the news. CUPE's president of the Air Canada division, Wesley Lesosky, said in a statement: "The Liberals are violating our charter rights to take job action and giving Air Canada exactly what they want — hours and hours of unpaid labour from underpaid flight attendants". CIRB ordered the flight attendants to return to work at 14:00 EDT on August 17, and Air Canada announced that they would start resuming flights in response. However, the union called the return-to-work order unconstitutional and vowed to continue the strike, which resulted in a further cancellation of the planned flights. Air Canada and CUPE reached a tentative agreement on August 19. The tentative agreement provides salary increases and ground pay for flight attendants.

The government's 2025 budget laid out that the size of the civil service would decrease by about 40,000 positions, with 16,000 positions being eliminated in three years. In February 2026, the offices of Special Representative on Combatting Islamophobia and Special Envoy on Preserving Holocaust Remembrance and Combatting Antisemitism were abolished by the government in favour of a new Advisory Council on Rights, Equality and Inclusion.

=== Public safety ===
The government introduced Bill C-14 in 2025, which reforms Canada's bail system and makes changes to the Criminal Code. The government has also proposed Bill C-9, which removes the religious exemption on hate speech. The government's "Assault-Style Firearms Compensation Program", announced in January 2026, has faced pushback from several jurisdictions and political parties.

=== Social issues ===
As part of the 2026 spring economic statement, Carney's government announced more than $750 million in sports-related funding in response to a decline in investment. In June 2026, Carney announced Canada's artificial intelligence (AI) strategy. Amid the 2026 Alberta independence referendum, he spoke against its passing, comparing it to the 2016 United Kingdom European Union membership referendum, which Carney experienced as Governor of the Bank of England. That same month, minister Marc Miller announced a proposed nationwide social media ban that would prohibit children under 16 from using major social media platforms.

On June 26, 2026, Prime Minister Carney announced a design-and-build competition for the "most ambitious, exciting, and affordable solutions" to a restoration of 24 Sussex Drive, which has sat vacant and in a state of disrepair since 2015. A jury chaired by Israeli-Canadian-American architect Moshe Safdie will recommend the winning design, which will be announced by Canada Day 2027. The Rideau Hall Foundation will oversee the collection of donations, which the government expects to fund "all or the majority" of the project.

=== Defence ===
With the government's increased defence spending, Canada will restore its ground-based air defence systems. Carney backed the creation of the Defence, Security and Resilience Bank, which will be headquartered in Canada.

In July 2026, Canadian Prime Minister Mark Carney selected Germany's TKMS over South Korea's Hanwha Ocean for the country's multi-billion dollar submarine fleet construction contract.

== Foreign policy ==
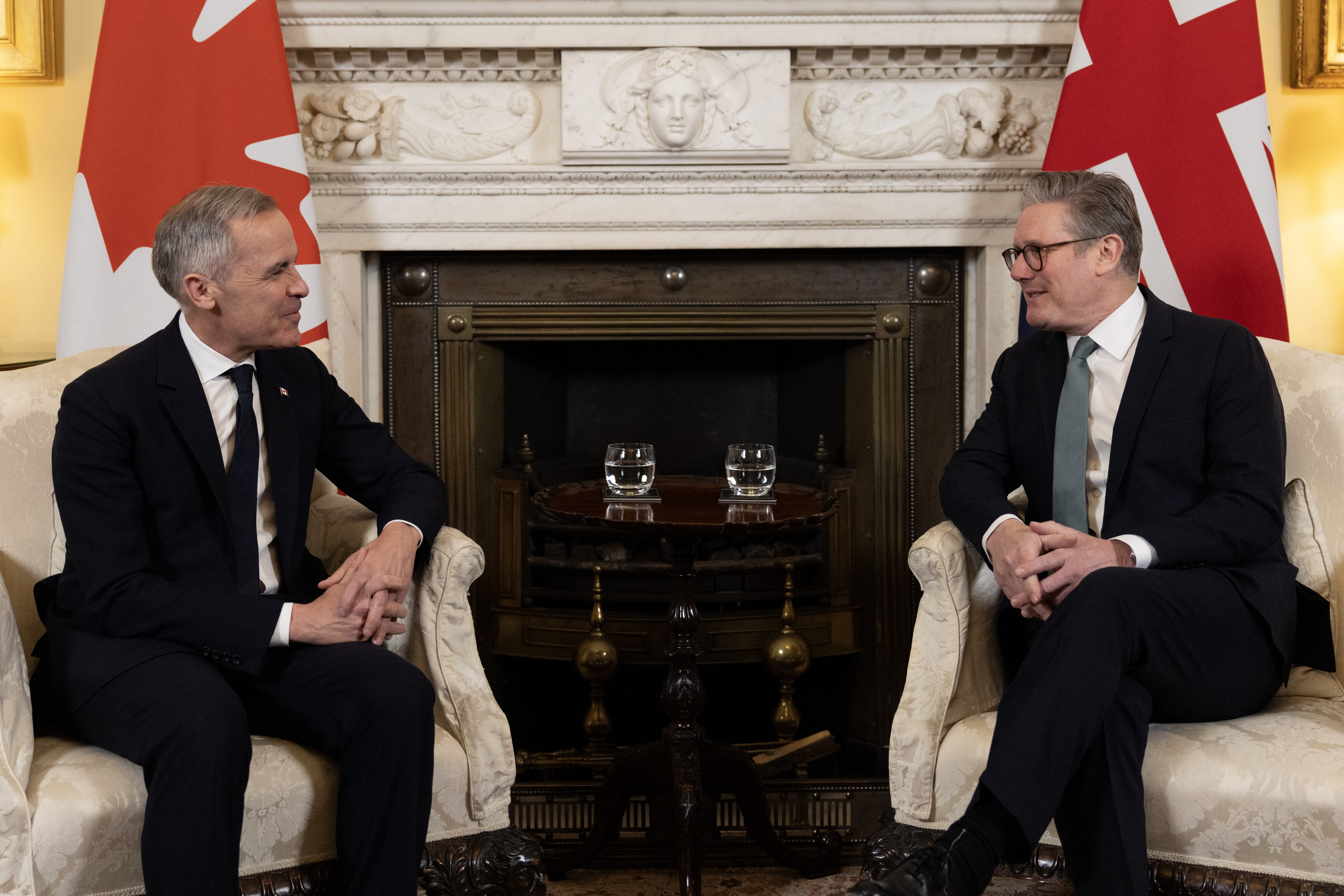
Carney meets with British Prime Minister Keir Starmer in London on 17 March 2025

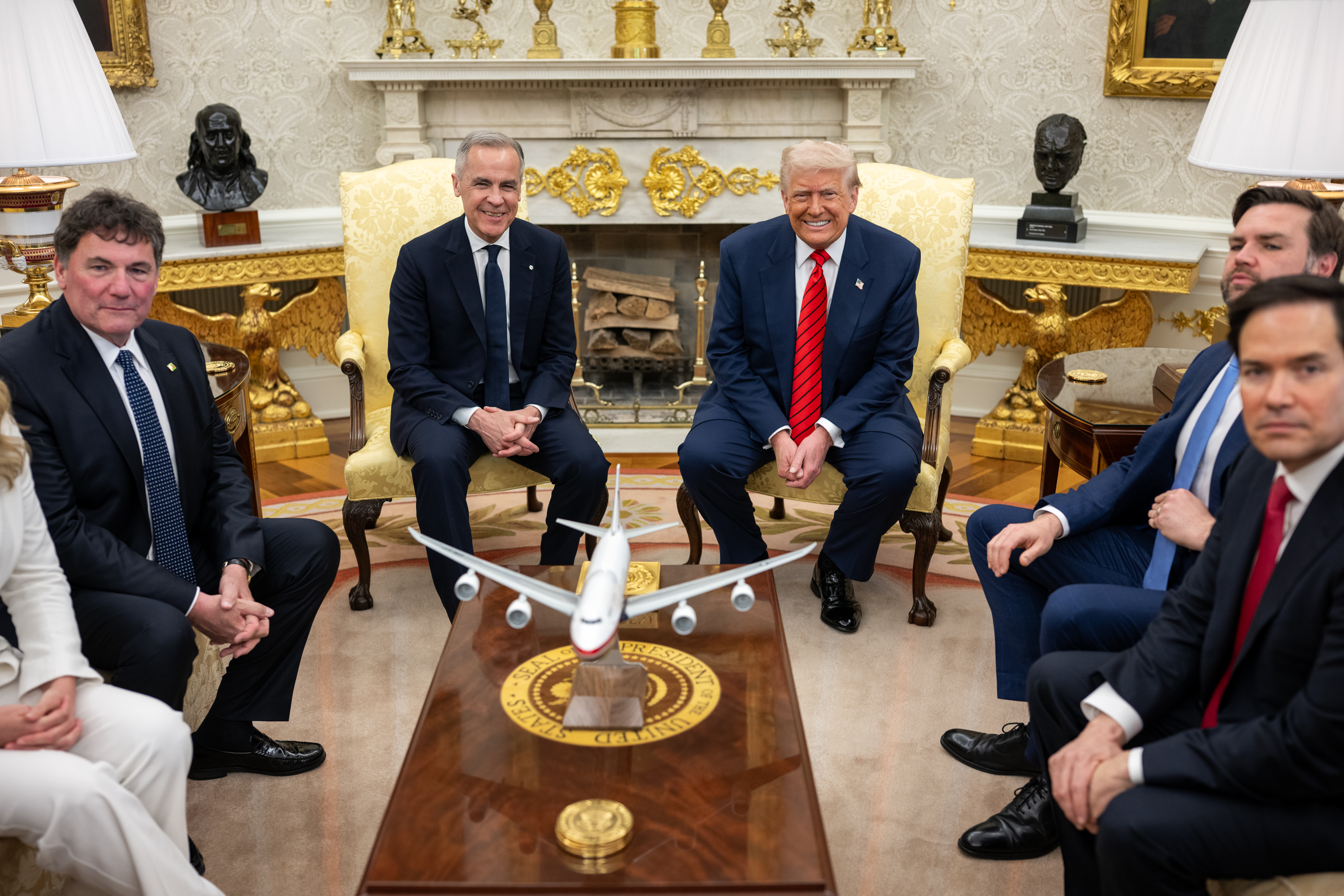
Carney meets with US President Donald Trump in Washington, D.C. on 7 May 2025

Carney's appointment occurred against the backdrop of Donald Trump's victory in the 2024 United States presidential election and his threats to impose sweeping tariffs on Canada. Disagreements over how to handle this threat were seen as being a contributor to the Trudeau ministry's collapse. However, the Trump administration's conduct would soon spark a political revival for the Liberals, with the ensuing trade war, along with the President's threats to annex Canada, greatly reducing the Liberals' polling gap with the Conservatives. By the time Carney was sworn in as prime minister, the polling gap had been eliminated altogether and the Liberals were in the lead, putting them in striking distance of a majority government. The scale of their political turnaround was described by analysts as having "little precedent" in Canadian history.

Carney's first foreign visits were to France and the United Kingdom on March 17 to strengthen mutual security and sovereignty, meeting French President Emmanuel Macron and British Prime Minister Keir Starmer. Carney pledged to step up Canada's place on the world stage, beginning with meeting the 2% NATO defence spending target in Fiscal Year 2026, and moving to replace the role of the US in lieu of the Trump administration.

In June 2025, Carney compared the Israeli invasion of the Gaza Strip and occupation of the West Bank to the Russian invasion of Ukraine. Following Israeli strikes on Iran in June 2025, Carney reaffirmed "Israel's right to defend itself" and called for restraint; though, Carney supported the 2026 Israeli–United States strikes on Iran while stressing that Canada was not party to the operation. In October 2025, Carney confirmed that Canada would fulfill its commitments to the International Criminal Court (ICC) and stated that, should Israeli Prime Minister Benjamin Netanyahu enter Canadian territory, he would be detained. In October, he attended the Gaza peace summit in Sharm El Sheikh, Egypt. In January 2026, Trump invited Carney to join the Gaza Board of Peace; this invitation was later rescinded.

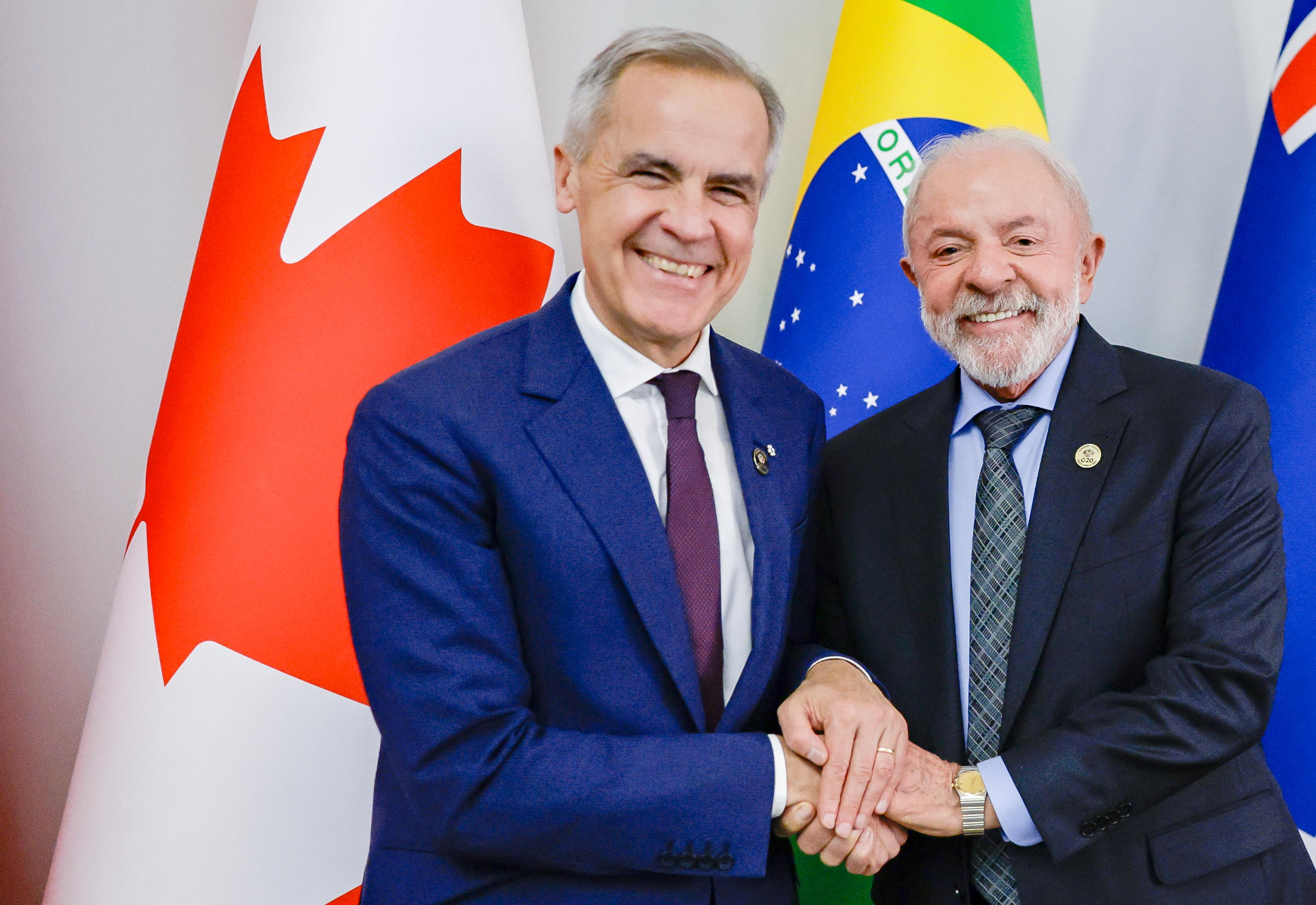
Carney with Brazilian President Luiz Inácio Lula da Silva on 23 November 2025

In July 2025, Carney announced that at the next meeting of the UN General Assembly, Canada would officially recognize the State of Palestine. Carney also announced that Canada would impose higher tariffs on steel from China.

In November 2025, Carney faced criticism during a high-profile trade mission to the United Arab Emirates (UAE) following investigations that linked Canadian-made weapons to atrocities in Sudan. While the mission aimed to secure a $70 billion (CAD) investment deal and to establish a Comprehensive Economic Partnership Agreement (CEPA) with the UAE, critics argued that economic interests were prioritized over human rights concerns. The deal was further scrutinized by human rights advocates due to allegations that the UAE was involved in arming the Rapid Support Forces (RSF) militia during the Sudanese civil war. Activists and human rights organizations accused the UAE of serving as a key intermediary in facilitating these weapons, thereby bypassing international arms embargoes.

In December 2025, Carney's government reached an agreement to join the European Union's Security Action for Europe (SAFE) initiative. The agreement gives Canadian defence companies expanded access to European markets. Preceding this, Canada joined ReArm Europe, a European-led defence initiative. The country signed a defence agreement with South Korea in February 2026, and various other deals with Japan and Australia in March 2026. Carney also delivered an address to the Parliament of Australia.

In January 2026, Carney made a state visit to China, the first visit of a Canadian prime minister to the country since 2017. Accompanying him were select Liberal MPs, Cabinet ministers, and Saskatchewan premier Scott Moe. Carney met with Chinese leader Xi Jinping, where the two agreed to lower tariffs on Canadian canola oil from 85% to 15% and on Chinese electric vehicles from 100% to 6.1%. During an official state visit to Beijing, Carney announced the establishment of a "new strategic partnership" between Canada and China. When asked about human rights in China, Carney responded, "We take the world as it is, not as we wish it to be." During his state visit to Qatar (the first of any sitting Canadian prime minister), he announced a new strategic partnership with the country and that the government aims to finalize the Canada-Qatar Foreign Investment Promotion and Protection Agreement by the summer of 2026. Carney also condemned the Iranian government's crackdown on protesters amid ongoing anti-government demonstrations in Iran. Following the 2026 Tumbler Ridge shooting, Carney cancelled his trip to the 62nd Munich Security Conference. In May, Carney became the first leader of a non-European country to participate in a meeting of the European Political Community.

After a diplomatic row since 2023, Canada's relations with India cooled under Carney's premiership, with the two countries restoring diplomatic relations in 2025. Carney made a state visit to India in early 2026, where he met with Indian officials, including Prime Minister Narendra Modi; the two nations signed multiple MOUs worth billions of dollars, relating to energy, minerals, pharmaceuticals, academics, and more. Carney's openness towards restoring ties with India has received criticism from some Sikh rights organizations within Canada, in the wake of allegations of foreign interference.

In July 2026, Carney and Philippine President Bongbong Marcos agreed to upgrade bilateral relations to a strategic partnership.

In September 2026, Carney announced that Canada was pursuing a "unique alliance" with the European Union rather than seeking full membership in the bloc, with EU commission president Ursula von der Leyen "opening the door" for Canada potentially becoming an "associate member" of the bloc.

=== 2026 World Economic Forum speech ===
Carney received a standing ovation at the World Economic Forum's 2026 annual meeting in Davos, Switzerland, that same month, where he spoke to the importance of "middle powers" working together to build their sovereignty and standing up to great powers that he claimed are using "economic integration as weapons". He outlined that his government believed that Canada must work with like-minded allies where possible to push back against domination by larger, wealthier and well-armed countries. His speech declared that he believed the "old world order" was ruptured, and that Canada must diversify trade around energy and critical minerals to raise funds to grow the domestic economy.

While the speech did not name Donald Trump by name, comments about Trump's threats to Greenland, coupled with Carney's trade deal with China signed the previous week, led to media analysis that the speech was aimed at the United States. His speech received praise internationally, including from current and former politicians of Finland, Australia, the United Kingdom, California, Mexico, and NATO, among others. Carney later spoke in Quebec City, refuting Trump's claim that "Canada lives because of the United States" by saying that "Canada thrives because we are Canadian." However, portions of the speech about the Plains of Abraham faced criticism from Quebec nationalists.

=== Trade dispute with the United States ===
In August 2026, the Trump administration imposed a 50% tariff on certain Canadian goods worth roughly US$20 billion following a collapse in trade talks between the two nations. Canada had suspended negotiations because of "last-minute changes" the Americans had made to the deal that "were unfair, uneconomic, and called into question the reliability of any deal." In response, Canada would impose retaliatory "dollar for dollar" tariffs in September, along with announcing support packages for impacted industries. Carney also stated that the Americans made "threats to the French language" and "Quebec culture", and made efforts "to restrict our protections of our language, our culture, and in effect, our sovereignty", which helped spell "the end of this phase of the negotiations"; this was dismissed by Trump and his officials. Later that month, Trump signed an executive order to rename the Lake Ontario waters bounded by the U.S. to "Lake America", which was rejected by Carney and other Canadian officials.

== Appointments ==
In September 2025, Carney appointed former Cabinet minister and his principal secretary David Lametti as ambassador to the United Nations and Vera Alexander as ambassador to Germany. In December 2025, Carney appointed businessman Mark Wiseman as ambassador to the United States, after Kirsten Hillman's resignation. He also appointed Janice Charette as Canada's Chief Trade Negotiator to the United States in February 2026.

Following the 2025 federal election, Carney reshuffled his team of parliamentary secretaries in June. He also appointed Marc-André Blanchard as his chief of staff (replacing interim appointee Marco Mendicino) and Michael Sabia as clerk of the Privy Council in June 2025, with Pierre Moreau being named Representative of the Government in the Senate in July. Carney conducted a shuffle of deputy ministers on December 19, 2025, and in March 2026. The government also nominated Annette Ryan Parliamentary Budget Officer. In January 2026, Carney appointed former Cabinet minister Bill Blair as Canadian High Commissioner to the United Kingdom and bureaucrat Nathalie Drouin as Ambassador of Canada to France. In April, he appointed Liberal MP Jonathan Wilkinson as Ambassador of Canada to the European Union.

In May 2026, Carney announced the appointment of jurist Louise Arbour as governor general of Canada. Arbour was sworn in on the morning of June 8, 2026, in a ceremony at the Senate of Canada Building. In June, Carney appointed Manitoba judge Glenn Joyal to the Supreme Court of Canada. He made his first appointments to the Senate in July, removing the non-partisanship criterion for Senate appointments.

== Opinion polling ==
Approval and disapproval of the Carney government

Carney began his premiership with a large upswing in approval ratings compared to his predecessor, Justin Trudeau. After his speech to the World Economic Forum in January 2026, Carney's Liberals saw a surge in support.

== See also ==
- Premierships of Pierre Trudeau
- Premiership of Jean Chrétien
- Premiership of Paul Martin
- Premiership of Stephen Harper
- Premiership of Justin Trudeau

Canadian federal premierships
Preceded by Justin Trudeau	Mark Carney; 2025–present	Incumbent
