= Canada's New Government =

Marketing term of the Government of Canada under Stephen Harper

"Canada's New Government" was a branding term or political slogan used by the Government of Canada during the first twenty months of the 28th Canadian Ministry under Stephen Harper. Previously, federal government announcements simply referred to the "Government of Canada".

Harper, leader of the Conservative Party, took office as Prime Minister of Canada on February 6, 2006. Immediately thereafter, the federal government began to use the term as part of a marketing campaign to differentiate the Harper government from the previous Liberal Party government, led by Paul Martin.

For the first few months after Harper's party assumed office, it is believed that this term was used only in very high level communication and press releases from the Prime Minister's Office and the offices of federal cabinet ministers. It was also applied to some government communication through the www.gc.ca web portal. Beginning in the summer of 2006, wider use of the term was encouraged by the Harper government in Canada's public service, however policies for its use were unclear.

The phrase was quietly dropped in October 2007, with most references reverting to the "Government of Canada" or "Harper Government". Beginning in April 2026, the phrase was used in some contexts by the Liberal government under Mark Carney, to differentiate from that of Carney's predecessor, Justin Trudeau.

== Okulitch incident ==
Issues regarding usage of the phrase within the public service culminated in a situation where Andrew Okulitch, a retired research scientist and at that time a scientist emeritus with the Geological Survey of Canada, refused to comply with a communications directive from Natural Resources Canada that specified employees use the term.

It read as follows:

"As per the Minister's Office, effective immediately, the words "Canada's New Government" are to be used instead of "the Government of Canada" in all departmental correspondence. Please note that the initial letters of all three words are capitalized. Thank you for your cooperation." (September 5, 2006, Vanessa Nelson, Executive Advisor, Communications Branch, Natural Resources Canada)

This was followed with a reply from Okulitch to all recipients of the email:

"Why do newly elected officials think everything begins with them taking office? They are merely stewards for as long as the public allows. They are the Government of Canada. Nothing more. I shall use "Geological Survey of Canada" on my departmental correspondence to avoid any connection with "New Government." The GSC, steward to Canada's earth resources for 164 years, is an institution worthy of my loyalty, as opposed to idiotic buzzwords coined by political hacks." (Andrew Okulitch, Scientist Emeritus, Geological Survey of Canada, Earth Sciences Sector, Natural Resources Canada}

Okulitch received this reply to his email within an hour from Irwin Itzkovitch, then Assistant Deputy Minister, Earth Sciences Sector:

"Given your strong though misdirected views of the role and authority of the Government as elected by the people, and your duty to reflect their decisions, I accept that you are immediately removing yourself from the Emeritus Program. I wish you every success in your future." (Irwin Itzkovitch, Special Advisor, Deputy Minister's Office, Natural Resources Canada)

A media frenzy ensued, deriding the federal government's treatment of the affair and Okulitch was reinstated by Deputy Minister of Natural Resources, Cassie Doyle who informed Okulitch that he would not have to use the phrase as it was not intended for "working-level people and never was." This was confirmed by Minister of Natural Resources, Gary Lunn, who said there was no expectation for anyone in the department to use the slogan.

== See also ==
- Brand management
