= Françoise Ducros =

Canadian government official

Françoise (Francie) Ducros was a Canadian government official. She was a communications director for Prime Minister Jean Chrétien, from 1999 to 2002, until she resigned after referring to President George W. Bush as a "moron".

== Biography ==
Ducros is a member of the Quebec Bar (1986) and holds degrees in common law and civil law from McGill University and an undergraduate degree in history from the University of Ottawa. She has practiced law, worked for an NGO and held several Canadian government positions.

For 10 years, she worked for the then Liberal government acting as chief of staff from 1993 to 1996 to Brian Tobin, former Minister of Fisheries and Oceans, and, from 1996 to 1999, as chief of staff to Stéphane Dion, then Minister of Inter-governmental Affairs.

On June 12, 1999, Ducros became the director of communications for then-Prime Minister Jean Chrétien. She resigned in November 2002 soon after the Bush comment.

She served as vice president at the Canadian International Development Agency. and as Senior Assistant Deputy Minister at Indigenous and Northern Affairs Canada. She retired from the Federal Public Service in 2020.

Ducros' father was a judge during the Front de libération du Québec trials.
