= Grytten (surname) =

Grytten is a surname. Notable people with the surname include:

- Frode Grytten (born 1960), Norwegian writer and journalist
- Harald Grytten (1938–2025), Norwegian philologist and historian
- Ingeborg Grytten (c. 1668–c. 1705), Norwegian writer
- Ola Honningdal Grytten (born 1964), Norwegian economics historian
- Sigurd Grytten (born 1972), Norwegian politician
- Torbjørn Grytten (born 1995), Norwegian footballer
