= Ingeborg (disambiguation) =

Ingeborg is a Scandinavian feminine given name.

Ingeborg may also refer to:

- Ingeborg (singer), Belgian singer and television presenter Ingeborg Sergeant
- Ingeborg (film), a 1960 West German comedy
- 391 Ingeborg, an asteroid discovered by Max Wolf in 1894
- Ingeborg (hulk), a ship hulked at Göteborg, Sweden, from 1972 to 1974

== See also ==
- Ingeborg Psalter, a late 12th century illuminated psalter
