= Ingeborg =

Ingeborg is a Germanic feminine given name, mostly used in Germany, Denmark, Sweden and Norway, derived from Old Norse Ingiborg, Ingibjǫrg, combining the theonym Ing with the element borg "stronghold, protection". Ingebjørg is the Norwegian most used variant of the name, and Ingibjörg is the Icelandic variant.

== People ==
=== Pre-modern era ===
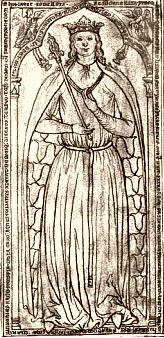
Ingeborg of Denmark, Queen of France

Ordered chronologically

- Ingeborg, 10th century mother of Ragnvald Ulfsson
- Ingeborg Tryggvasdotter (10th–11th century), daughter of Tryggve Olafsson (died 963), granddaughter of Harald Fairhair and sister of Olaf I of Norway
- Ingeborg of Kiev (fl. 1137), mother of Valdemar I of Denmark
- Ingibjörg Hakonsdóttir Of Orkney (fl. 12th century) wife of Óláfr Guðrøðarson king of Isle of Man
- Ingeborg of Denmark, Queen of France (1174–1237), wife of Philip II of France and daughter of Valdemar I of Denmark
- Ingeborg Eriksdotter of Sweden (c. 1212 – c. 1254), daughter of King Erik Knutsson of Sweden, wife of Birger Jarl and mother of King Valdemar of Sweden
- Ingeborg of Kalundborg (died 1267), influential Danish noble
- Ingeborg of Denmark, Queen of Norway (c. 1244 – 1287), wife of Magnus VI and daughter of Eric IV
- Ingeborg Birgersdotter (c. 1253 – 1302), duchess consort of Saxony
- Ingeborg of Sweden (1263–1292), Swedish princess and countess consort
- Ingeborg Magnusdotter of Sweden (1277–1319), Swedish princess and Queen of Denmark
- Ingeborg Eriksdottir of Norway (1297–1357), Norwegian princess and Swedish royal duchess
- Ingeborg of Mecklenburg (1343/45 – 1395), electress consort of Brandenburg and Countess of Holstein-Rendsburg, daughter of Albert II, Duke of Mecklenburg and his wife, Euphemia of Sweden
- Ingeborg of Norway (1301–1361), Norwegian duchess, Swedish royal duchess and sometime regent of Norway and Sweden
- Ingeborg of Denmark, Duchess of Mecklenburg (1347–1370), wife of Henry III, Duke of Mecklenburg, daughter of Valdemar IV of Denmark
- Ingeborg of Holstein (1396–1465), Swedish Roman Catholic Abbess of Vadstena Abbey
- Ingeborg Tott (died 1507), consort of the Swedish regent Sten Sture the elder
- Ingeborg Skeel (c. 1545–1604), Danish noblewoman and county sheriff

=== Modern era ===
Ordered alphabetically by last name

- Princess Ingeborg of Denmark (1878–1958), Swedish princess, daughter of Frederick VIII of Denmark, wife of Prince Carl, Duke of Västergötland
- Ingeborg Akeleye (1741–1800), Norwegian noblewoman and heiress
- Ingeborg Bachmann (1927–1973), Austrian poet and author
- Ingeborg Beling (1904–1988), German ethologist and chronobiologist
- Ingeborg Belling (1848–1927), Norwegian actress
- Ingeborg Brams (1921–1989), Danish actress
- Ingeborg Bruhn Bertelsen (1894–1977), Danish actress
- Ingeborg Danz (born 1961), German opera singer
- Ingeborg Drewitz (1923–1986), German writer
- Ingeborga Dapkūnaitė (born 1963), Lithuanian actress
- Ingeborg Fülepp, Croatian artist
- Ingeborg Gjærum (born 1985), Norwegian environmentalist
- Ingeborg Grässle (born 1961), German politician and Member of the European Parliament
- Ingeborg Grytten (c. 1668 – c. 1705), Norwegian writer
- Ingeborg Hallstein (born 1936), German opera singer
- Ingeborg Hansen (1886–1954), Danish lawyer and politician
- Ingeborg Hochmair (born 1953), Austrian electrical engineer, inventor and entrepreneur
- Ingeborg Hunzinger (1915–2009), German sculptor
- Ingibjörg Ólöf Isaksen (born 1977), Icelandic politician
- Inge King (1915–2016), German-born Australian sculptor
- Ingeborg Körner (born 1929), German actress
- Ingeborg Levin, German geoscientist and climatologist
- Ingeborg Lüscher (born 1936), German/Swiss multi-media artist
- Ingeborg Mello (1919–2009), Argentine track and field athlete, primarily in the discus and shot put
- Ingeborg i Mjärhult (1665–1749), Swedish natural healer, soothsayer and spiritual visionary
- Ingeborg Møller (1878–1964), Norwegian playwright, novelist and biographer
- Ingeborg Nyberg (born 1940), Swedish singer and actress
- Ingeborg Østgård (born 2003), Norwegian middle-distance and cross country runner
- Ingeborg Pfüller (born 1932), Argentine discus thrower
- Ingeborg Rapoport (1912–2017), German pediatrician, the oldest person to receive a PhD at age 102
- Ingeborg Refling Hagen (1895–1989), Norwegian author and teacher
- Ingeborg Reichelt (1928–2022), German soprano
- Ingeborg Bronsart von Schellendorf (1840–1913), Swedish-German composer born Ingeborg Starck
- Ingeborg Schmitz (1922–1985), German Olympic swimmer
- Ingeborg Schwenzer (born 1951), German jurist and law professor
- Ingeborg Schöner (born 1935), German actress
- Ingeborg Seynsche (1905–1994), German mathematician
- Ingeborg (singer), Belgian singer and television presenter Ingeborg Sergeant
- Ingeborg Sjöqvist (1912–2015), Swedish diver
- Ingeborg Sørensen (born 1948), Norwegian model and Playboy Playmate of the Month for March 1975
- Ingeborg Spangsfeldt (1895–1968), Danish film actress of the 1910s and '20s

== Legendary characters ==
- Hjalmar and Ingeborg, Swedish lovers in Norse mythology
- The beloved of Frithiof in Frithiof's Saga
- The daughter of the Swedish King Eysteinn Beli, betrothed to Ragnar Lodbrok
