= Ingeborg Schwenzer =

German jurist

Ingeborg Schwenzer (born 25 October 1951 in Stuttgart) is a German jurist and professor for private and comparative law at the University of Basel, Switzerland.

== Life and career ==
Schwenzer studied law at the University of Freiburg i. Br. and the Université de Genève from 1970 to 1975. From 1973 to 1975 she worked as student assistant at the Institute for Administrative Law at the University of Freiburg i. Br. In 1975, Schwenzer passed the Erste juristische Staatsprüfung (First State Exam in Law) at the University of Freiburg. She ranked third amongst 209 candidates.

From 1975 to 1976, Schwenzer studied at the University of California, Berkeley. At the end of her studies she was awarded the title Master of Laws with high honors.

From 1977 to 1981, Schwenzer was research assistant to Peter Schlechtriem at the Institute for Comparative and International Private Law of the University of Freiburg. She obtained the degree of Dr. iur. utr. in 1978 for her doctoral thesis entitled Die Freizeichnung des Verkäufers von der Sachmängelhaftung im amerikanischen und deutschen Recht (The seller’s limitation of liability for defective goods under American and German law). For this thesis she was awarded the Herrnstadt Award for the best doctoral thesis of the year 1978.

From 1978 to 1980, Schwenzer did her practical legal training in Freiburg i. Br. In 1980, she passed the Zweite juristische Staatsprüfung (Second State Exam in Law) and was ranked first amongst 334 candidates.

From 1980 to 1987, Schwenzer was assistant professor and lecturer for private and commercial law at the Verwaltungs- und Wirtschaftsakademie (Academy of Administration and Commerce) in Freiburg i. Br.

In 1986, Schwenzer was appointed lecturer at Philipps-Universität Marburg.

In 1987, Schwenzer’s Habilitationsschrift with the title Vom Status zur Realbeziehung – Familienrecht im Wandel (From status to actual relation – family law in the flux) was accepted by the University of Freiburg. She received the venia legendi for private law, commercial law, private international law and comparative law. She then was a substitute professor for private, commercial, and labor law at the University of Konstanz. Later that year, she was offered the position of professor for private law by the University of Cologne and the position of professor for private law, private international law and comparative law by the University of Mainz. She accepted the latter and was appointed professor by the University of Mainz in December 1987.

In 1989, Schwenzer accepted a professorship for a named chair in private law at the University of Basel. Thereby Schwenzer became the first female professor at a law faculty in all of Switzerland and the second female professor at the University of Basel. Schwenzer was later offered positions as professor for German and European private law by the University of Kiel (1991) and as professor for private law by the Humboldt University of Berlin (1995), both of which she rejected. In 2017 she retired from the University of Basel.

Schwenzer has been adjunct professor at City University of Hong Kong from 2010 to 2016 and at Griffith University, Australia, from 2013 to 2016.

Since 2014 Schwenzer is Dean of SiLS - Swiss International Law School.

Over the years, Schwenzer was visiting professor at various institutions: 1994–2002 at the Europainstitut, Basel, Switzerland; 2008 at the Université de Paris Val-de-Marne, France; 2009 at Victoria University of Wellington, New Zealand; 2010 at Loyola University Chicago, USA; 2011 at the University of Buea, Cameroon; also in 2011 at the İstanbul Bilgi Üniversitesi, Turkey; 2012 at the University of Ankara, Turkey; also in 2012 at the Pontifícia Universidade Católica do Paraná, Brazil; 2013 at the Universitetet i Oslo, Norway; 2014 at Griffith University, Australia; 2015 at Dar Al-Hekma University, Jeddah, Saudi Arabia.

== Areas of research and interest ==
In her research, Schwenzer primarily focuses on law of obligations, commercial law and family law. In addition to that, she also has a great interest in arbitration and, in particular, in university didactics.

=== Global Sales Law Project ===
The Global Sales Law Project is a project of comparative law in the field of sales law and contract law.

==== Global Sales and Contract Law ====
The centerpiece of the project is the handbook Global Sales and Contract Law (GSCL), which Schwenzer authored together with Pascal Hachem and Christopher Kee. This handbook compares the sales and contract laws of more than 60 states. Particularly remarkable about the book is the approach of research in so far as the comparison is completely based on the functional comparative method rather than on the basis of separate country reports. The authors based their work on the doctoral theses of Mohamed Hafez (Arabia and the Middle East), Natia Lapiashvili (Eastern Europe and Central Asia), Edgardo Muñoz (Latin America), Jean Alain Penda Matipe (Central and Southern Africa), and Sophia Juan Yang (Southeast Asia). Each of these theses was a comparative legal work on one family of legal systems and all of them were supervised by Schwenzer.

==== Commentary on the CISG ====
Schwenzer edits the leading commentary on the UN Convention on Contracts for the International Sale of Goods (CISG). This commentary was published in German (6th edition 2013), English (4th edition 2016), Spanish (2011), Portuguese (2014), Turkish (2015), French, Chinese, Russian and more versions are underway.

==== CISG-online.ch ====
Until her retirement in 2017 Schwenzer has run the only comprehensive database in the German-speaking countries which contains all relevant case law on the CISG. The database was founded in 1995 by Peter Schlechtriem at the University of Freiburg i. Br. Since 2002 it was administered at Schwenzer’s Chair at the University of Basel.

==== Willem C. Vis International Commercial Arbitration Moot ====
Since the first Willem C. Vis Moot in 1994, Schwenzer participates in the role of arbitrator at this competition which takes place in Vienna every year and which is the world’s largest international moot competition on arbitration. Since 2004 she also functions as arbitrator at the Willem C. Vis East Moot in Hong Kong. Additionally, she has been coaching the Vis team of the University of Basel from 1995 to 2015.

=== Model Family Code ===
In the year 2006, Schwenzer drafted a model codification of family law, called the Model Family Code, together with Mariel Dimsey. A comprehensive comparison of family law in European, Anglo-American, and Oceanian jurisdictions served as the basis for this model code. The distinct advantage of the Model Family Code as opposed to the continuous small changes undertaken in domestic family codes consists in it being an all-encompassing consistent codification. Moreover, the Model Family Code allows for the flexible implementation of cultural values into its core system in order to accommodate the respective realities of family law.

=== SiLS - Swiss International Law School ===
Schwenzer is Dean of the Swiss International Law School (SiLS), a private web based Law School offering a LL.M programme.

== Publications and editorships ==
According to Schwenzer’s list of publications (as of February 2017), Schwenzer has published 17 monographs, has edited more than 40 books, and written more than 200 articles and contributions to commentaries.

Comprehensive list of publications: https://www.ingeborgschwenzer.com/publications

== Selected memberships and positions ==
- Since 2016 Founding Faculty Member of the International Dispute Resolution Academy
- Since 2015 Member of the American Law Institute
- Since 2014 Member Board of Directors of the International Academy of Commercial and Consumer Law
- Since 2013 Member Board of the German Society of International Law
- Since 2011 Chair of the CISG (Convention on Contracts for the International Sale of Goods) Advisory Council
- Since 2011 Member Board of the International Law Association, Swiss Branch
- Since 2010 Member of the European Law Institute
- Since 2010 Member of the Academic Council of the Institute of Transnational Arbitration
- 2004 – 2012 Deputy Chair of the Board of the German Jurists Association
- Since 2001 Member of the Expert Group of the Commission on European Family Law
- Since 2000 Member of the International Academy of Comparative Law
- 1999 – 2005 Member of the Board of the Association of Lecturers in Private Law (Zivilrechtslehrervereinigung)
- 1993 – 2006 Member of the Board of the Swiss Institute of Comparative Law

For a comprehensive list of membership: https://www.ingeborgschwenzer.com/memberships

== Awards ==
- 2011 Law Career Achievement Award of the Arab Society for Commercial and Maritime Law
