= Trudeau government =

Trudeau government or Trudeau cabinet may refer to:

- 20th Canadian Ministry, led by Pierre Trudeau from 1968 to 1979
- 22nd Canadian Ministry, led by Pierre Trudeau from 1980 to 1984
- 29th Canadian Ministry, led by Justin Trudeau from 2015 to 2025

== See also ==
- Premierships of Pierre Trudeau
- Premiership of Justin Trudeau
