= Pierre Trudeau ministry =

Pierre Trudeau ministry may refer to:

- 20th Canadian Ministry, led by Pierre Trudeau from 1968 to 1979
- 22nd Canadian Ministry, led by Pierre Trudeau from 1980 to 1984

== See also ==
- Premierships of Pierre Trudeau
