= Premiership of Trudeau =

Premiership of Trudeau may refer to:

- Premierships of Pierre Trudeau
- Premiership of Justin Trudeau
