= Premierships of Pierre Trudeau =

Period of the Government of Canada from 1968 to 1979 and from 1980 to 1984

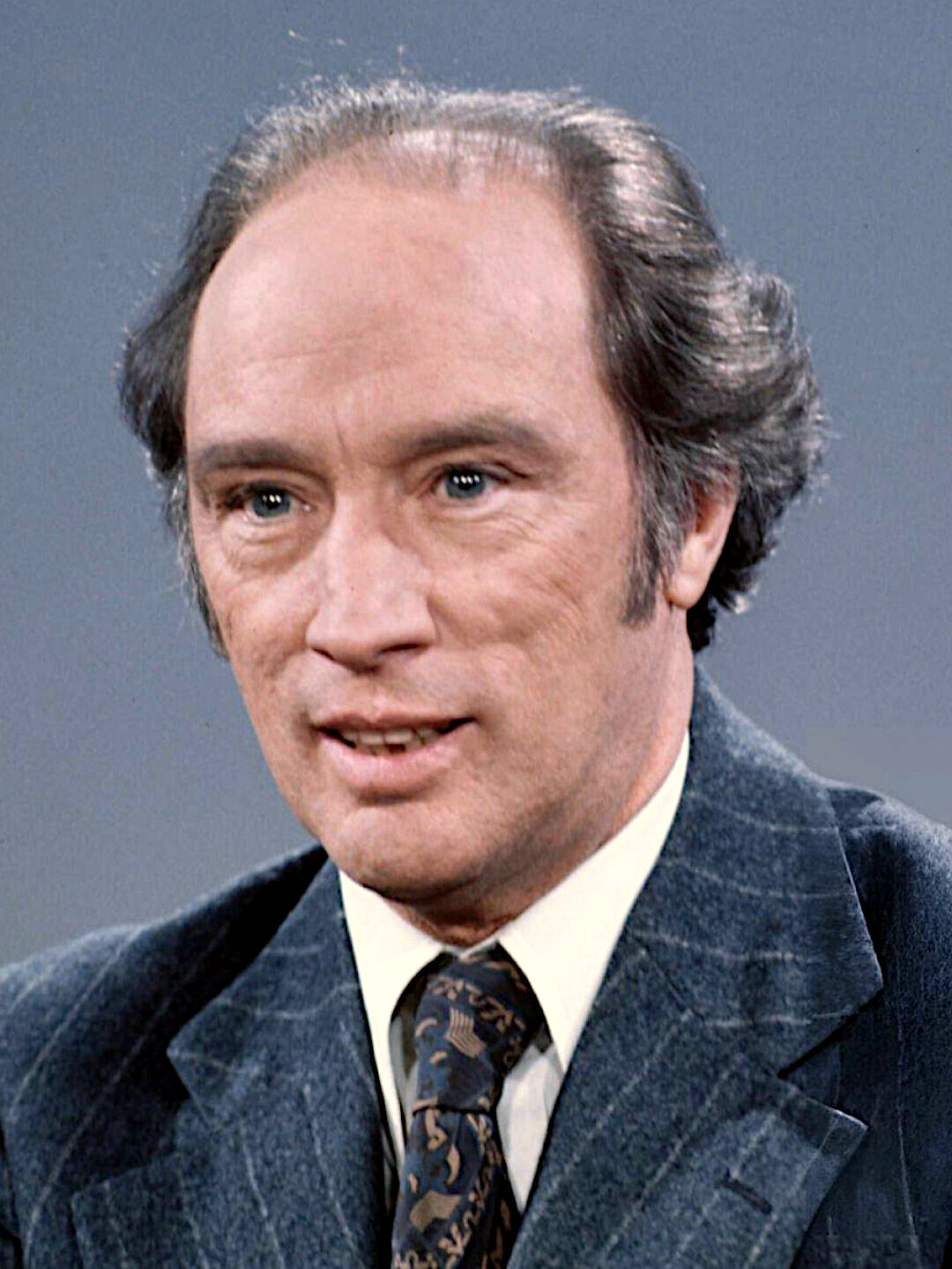
- UPI press photo, 1975
- Premierships of Pierre Trudeau
- Monarch: Elizabeth II
- Prime Minister: Pierre Trudeau
- Party: Liberal
- Seat: Office of the Prime Minister
- First term April 20, 1968 – June 4, 1979
- Cabinet: 20th Canadian Ministry
- Election: 1968; 1972; 1974
- Appointed by: Roland Michener
- Constituency: Mount Royal
- Second term March 3, 1980 – June 30, 1984
- Cabinet: 22nd Canadian Ministry
- Election: 1980
- Appointed by: Edward Schreyer
- Constituency: Mount Royal

The premierships of Pierre Trudeau occurred from April 20, 1968, to June 4, 1979, and from March 3, 1980, to June 30, 1984. Pierre Trudeau was sworn in as Prime Minister of Canada two weeks after he succeeded Prime Minister Lester B. Pearson as leader of the Liberal Party in the 1968 leadership election.

Trudeau led his Liberals to win a comfortable majority government in the subsequent 1968 federal election. In the 1972 federal election, Trudeau's Liberals were reduced to a minority government, though won a second majority in 1974. In the 1979 federal election, Trudeau's Liberals lost power to a Progressive Conservative led by Joe Clark, who formed a minority government. The PC government collapsed in a vote of non-confidence, triggering the 1980 federal election in which Trudeau's Liberals won a third majority. Trudeau is the most recent prime minister to win four elections and to serve two non-consecutive terms. His tenure of 15 years and 164 days makes him Canada's third-longest-serving prime minister, behind John A. Macdonald and William Lyon Mackenzie King.

In domestic policy, Trudeau confronted the Quebec sovereignty movement; he suppressed the 1970 Quebec terrorist crisis by invoking the War Measures Act and in the 1980 Quebec referendum, successfully campaigned against Quebec's proposal to negotiate a sovereignty-association agreement with the federal government. In other domestic policy, Trudeau established a pan-Canadian identity by pioneering official bilingualism and multiculturalism.

Trudeau's government was heavily economically interventionist. He shifted the Liberals to an economic nationalist direction by creating Petro-Canada and the National Energy Program; the latter was heavily opposed by the oil-rich region of Western Canada, leading to the introduction of the term "Western alienation". To combat rising inflation, Trudeau's government enforced wage and price controls from 1975 to 1978 through the passing of the Anti-Inflation Act. After the 1969 budget, Trudeau ran deficits for the rest of his tenure as a result of major increases in public spending; by the time he left office in 1984, the deficit was at $37 billion.

Trudeau pursued an independent foreign policy, distancing Canada from the United States. He differed Canada from other capitalist Western nations by forming close ties with the Soviet Union, China, and Cuban leader Fidel Castro. In 1982, he patriated the Constitution and established the Canadian Charter of Rights and Freedoms, actions that achieved full Canadian sovereignty and ending Canada's 115-year usage of the United Kingdom's constitution.

On June 30, 1984, Trudeau resigned as prime minister, being succeeded by his former Cabinet minister, John Turner.

== Background ==
A lawyer from Quebec, Pierre Trudeau was elected as a Liberal Member of Parliament in the 1965 federal election. He quickly became Prime Minister Lester Pearson's parliamentary secretary, and in 1967, he was appointed as minister of justice and attorney general. In early 1968, Pearson announced his intention of resigning as a result of declining health and failing to win a majority government in two attempts. This triggered the April 6, 1968, leadership election. Trudeau entered the race, as did eight other candidates. Despite his relative inexperience in politics, Trudeau won on the fourth ballot. Trudeau was sworn in as prime minister on April 20.

== First premiership (1968–1979) ==
=== Swearing-in, subsequent election ===
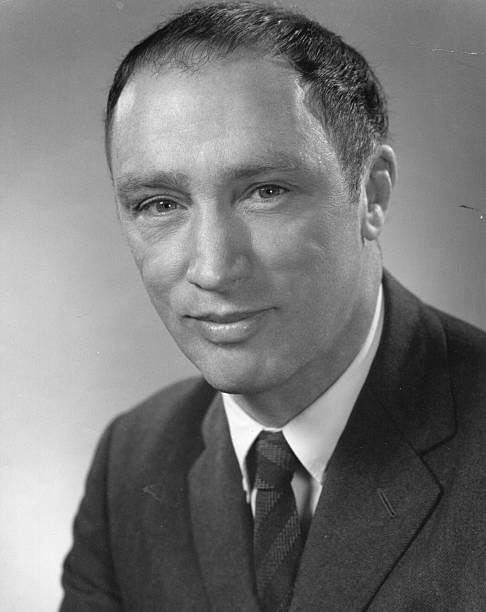
Prime Minister Trudeau in 1968

As the new leader of the governing Liberals, Trudeau was sworn in as Prime Minister on April 20.

Trudeau soon called an election, for June 25. His election campaign benefited from an unprecedented wave of personal popularity called "Trudeaumania", which saw Trudeau mobbed by throngs of youths. Trudeau's main national opponents were PC leader Robert Stanfield and NDP leader Tommy Douglas, both popular figures who had been premiers, respectively, of Nova Scotia and Saskatchewan (albeit in Trudeau's native Quebec, the main competition to the Liberals was from the Ralliement créditiste, led by Réal Caouette).

On the eve of the election, during the annual Saint-Jean-Baptiste Day parade in Montreal, rioting Quebec sovereignists threw rocks and bottles at the grandstand where Trudeau was seated, chanting "Trudeau au poteau!" (Trudeau – to the stake!). Rejecting the pleas of his aides that he take cover, Trudeau stayed in his seat, facing the rioters, without any sign of fear. The image of the defiant prime minister impressed the public. The next day, Trudeau handily won the 1968 election with a strong majority government; this was the Liberals' first majority since 1953.

=== Social policy ===
==== Social reforms: Criminal Law Amendment Act ====
In 1969, Trudeau's government passed the Criminal Law Amendment Act, which was originally introduced as Bill C-195 on December 21, 1967, when Trudeau was justice minister. When Trudeau became prime minister, he appointed John Turner as justice minister, who modified and re-introduced the bill as Bill C–150 on December 19, 1968. The bill legalized therapeutic abortion under certain conditions and made it legal for women to get an abortion if a therapeutic abortion committee of three doctors felt the pregnancy endangered the mental, emotional or physical well-being of the mother. The bill also decriminalized "buggery" and "gross indecency" between adults over age 21, and between husband and wife, provided each party consented. The bill also gave the provincial and federal governments the opportunity to use lotteries to fund worthwhile activities (e.g. 1976 Montreal Olympics). The bill made it illegal to provide firearms to persons of "unsound mind" or criminals under prohibition orders. The bill also expanded the definition of a 'firearm', which, prior to 1969, included only handguns and automatic firearms, and introduced non-restricted, restricted, and prohibited firearm categories. Lastly, the bill made it an offence to drive with a blood alcohol content (BAC) in excess of 80 mg/100 ml of blood. Refusal of a police officer's demand to provide a breath sample was made an offence at the same time and both began as summary conviction offences, with a mandatory minimum $50 fine.

As part of the package of reforms contained in the Criminal Law Amendment Act, Trudeau's government also introduced Bill S-15, which decriminalised contraceptives and brought them under the regulatory power of the Food and Drugs Act, which governs medicines and medicinal devices. Bill S-15 repealed the reference to contraceptives in the Criminal Code, but left abortifacients criminalised. Bill S-15 received royal assent on June 27, 1969, the same day as the Criminal Law Amendment Act.

==== Bilingualism and multiculturalism ====
Trudeau's first major legislative push was implementing the majority of recommendations of Pearson's Royal Commission on Bilingualism and Biculturalism via the Official Languages Act, which made French and English the co-equal official languages of the federal government. More controversial than the declaration (which was backed by the NDP and, with some opposition in caucus, the PCs) was the implementation of the Act's principles: between 1966 and 1976, the francophone proportion of the civil service and military doubled, causing alarm in some sections of anglophone Canada that they were being disadvantaged.

Trudeau's Cabinet fulfilled Part IV of the Royal Commission on Bilingualism and Biculturalism's report by announcing a "Multiculturalism Policy" on October 8, 1971. It was the first of its kind in the world, and was then emulated in several provinces, such as Alberta, Saskatchewan, Manitoba, and other countries most notably Australia, which has had a similar history and immigration pattern. Beyond the specifics of the policy itself, this action signalled an openness to the world and coincided with a more open immigration policy that had been brought in by Trudeau's predecessor Lester B. Pearson. This recognized that while Canada was a country of two official languages, it recognized a plurality of cultures – "a multicultural policy within a bilingual framework". This annoyed public opinion in Quebec, which believed that it challenged Quebec's claim of Canada as a country of two nations.

==== 1969 White Paper ====
In 1969, Trudeau along with his then Minister of Indian Affairs Jean Chrétien, proposed the 1969 White Paper (officially entitled "Statement of the Government of Canada on Indian policy"). Under the legislation of the White Paper, Indian Status would be eliminated. First Nations Peoples would be incorporated fully into provincial government responsibilities as equal Canadian citizens, and reserve status would be removed imposing the laws of private property in indigenous communities. Any special programs or considerations that had been allowed to First Nations people under previous legislation would be terminated, as the special considerations were seen by the Government to act as a means to further separate Indian peoples from Canadian citizens. This proposal was seen by many as racist and an attack on Canada's aboriginal population. The Paper proposed the general assimilation of First Nations into the Canadian body politic through the elimination of the Indian Act and Indian status, the parcelling of reserve land to private owners, and the elimination of the Department of Indian and Northern Affairs. The White Paper prompted the first major national mobilization of Indian and Aboriginal activists against the federal government's proposal, leading to Trudeau setting aside the legislation.

==== Immigration and refugees ====
In 1969, Canada signed the 1951 United Nations Convention Relating to the Status of Refugees and its 1967 Protocol. Though Canada recognized refugees as a special humanitarian class of migrants, Trudeau's government continued the policy of admitting refugees on a case-by-case basis and did not establish formal measures for examining refugee claims.

Trudeau's government passed Immigration Act, 1976, which came into effect in 1978. It outlined the main objectives of Canada's immigration policy as it sought to promote Canada's demographic, economic, social, and cultural goals. The bill also sought to prioritize family reunion, diversity, and fighting discrimination. The Act allowed different levels of government and the volunteer sector to help new immigrants adapt to Canadian society. It also defined refugees as a distinct class of immigrants, requiring the government to fulfill its obligations to refugees under international agreements. Finally, the Act declared that the quasi-judicial Immigration Board should be fully independent and therefore its decisions regarding immigration claims and appeals can not be overruled by the federal government.

==== Death penalty ====
On January 26, 1973, Trudeau's Solicitor General, Warren Allmand, continued the partial ban on the death penalty (which was enacted in 1967 and had a five-year moratorium), which would eventually lead to the abolition of the death penalty. On July 14, 1976, Bill C-84 was passed in the House of Commons by a narrow margin of 130-124 in a free vote, resulting in the abolition of the death penalty for murder, treason, and piracy. It also instituted a life sentence without parole for 25 years for first-degree murder. It was given royal assent on July 16 and came into force on July 26.

==== Housing ====
In 1973, Trudeau's government amended the National Housing Act to provide financial assistance for new home buying, loans for co-operative housing, and low interest loans for municipal and private non-profit housing. The amendments saw the introduction the Rental Rehabilitation Assistance Program, which established that homeowners and occupants in low income neighborhoods could qualify for small grants to be used for home repair. Also introduced was the Assisted Home Ownership Program which allowed the Canada Mortgage and Housing Corporation (CMHC) to start providing grants and subsidized interest rates to low income families (though in 1978 an amendment discontinued the provision of grant money to these families, which led to a high incidence of defaults, and in turn, necessitated that the federal government provide financial assistance to the CMHC). The amendments saw the passage of the Rent Supplement Act, which enabled the CMHC to partner with private landlords, cooperatives, and not-for-profit associations to provide affordable housing; in addition, the act saw the CMHC agree to fund the difference between market rental prices and rent prices geared to the specific occupant's income. Lastly, the Canada Rental Supply Program was introduced to provide interest-free loans for 15 years to developers who agreed to allocate a proportion of units toward social housing initiatives. In order to ensure that loans contributed to the provision of low income housing, the CMHC was restricted to giving loans amounting to $7,500 or less per unit.

The Registered home ownership savings plan (RHOSP) was introduced in the government's November 1974 budget. Similar to RRSPs, proceeds from the RHOSP could be received tax-free for either a down payment for the acquisition of an owner-occupied dwelling or to buy furnitures for the dwelling (or the spouse's dwelling). Individuals who already owned a home (either owner-occupied or rented to another person) could not deduct RHOSP contributions. In 1976, Trudeau's government allowed for transfers of funds between the RHOSP (for instance to select a plan with better returns). In 1977, the government tightened the rules of the RHOSP (the reforms removed the purchase of furnitures from the list of usage allowed for tax-free use of RHOSP proceeds starting in 1978; disallowed deductible contributions for a taxpayer whose spouse owned a home; suspended tax-free rollover of RHSOP funds to an RRSP; and capped the lifetime of the RHOSP at 20 years).

=== Quebec ===
==== October Crisis ====
Trudeau's first serious test came during the October Crisis of 1970, when a Marxist-influenced group, the Front de libération du Québec (FLQ) kidnapped British Trade Consul James Cross at his residence on October 5. Five days later Quebec Labour Minister Pierre Laporte was also kidnapped. Trudeau, with the acquiescence of Premier of Quebec Robert Bourassa, responded by invoking the War Measures Act which gave the government sweeping powers of arrest and detention without trial. Trudeau presented a determined public stance during the crisis, answering the question of how far he would go to stop the violence by saying "Just watch me". Laporte was found dead on October 17 in the trunk of a car. The cause of his death is still debated. Five of the FLQ members were flown to Cuba in 1970 as part of a deal in exchange for James Cross' life, although they eventually returned to Canada years later, where they served time in prison.

Although this response is still controversial and was opposed at the time as excessive by parliamentarians like Tommy Douglas and David Lewis, it was met with only limited objections from the public. At the time, opinion polls in Quebec and the rest of Canada showed overwhelming support for the War Measures Act; in a December 1970 Gallup Poll, it was noted that 89% of English-speaking Canadians and 86% of French-speaking Canadians supported the introduction of the War Measures Act. They respectively showed 6% and 9% disapproval while the remaining 5% of each population was undecided.

==== Post-October Crisis ====
After consultations with the provincial premiers, Trudeau agreed to attend a conference called by British Columbia Premier W. A. C. Bennett to attempt to finally patriate the Canadian constitution. Negotiations with the provinces by Minister of Justice John Turner created a draft agreement, known as the Victoria Charter, that entrenched a charter of rights, bilingualism, and a guarantee of a veto of constitutional amendments for Ontario and Quebec, as well as regional vetoes for Western Canada and Atlantic Canada, within the new constitution. The agreement was acceptable to the nine predominantly-English speaking provinces, while Quebec's premier Robert Bourassa requested two weeks to consult with his cabinet. After a strong backlash of popular opinion against the agreement in Quebec, Bourassa stated Quebec would not accept it.

Trudeau faced increasing challenges in Quebec, starting with bitter relations with Bourassa and his Liberal government in Quebec. After a rise in the polls after the rejection of the Victoria Charter, the Quebec Liberals had taken a more confrontational approach with the Federal government on the constitution, French language laws, and the language of air traffic control in Quebec. Trudeau responded with increasing anger at what he saw as nationalist provocations against the Federal government's bilingualism and constitutional initiatives, at times expressing his personal contempt for Bourassa.

Partially in an attempt to shore up his support, Bourassa called a surprise election in 1976 that resulted in René Lévesque and the Parti Québécois (PQ) winning a majority government. The PQ had chiefly campaigned on a "good government" platform, but promised a referendum on independence to be held within their first mandate. Trudeau and Lévesque had been personal rivals, with Trudeau's intellectualism contrasting with Lévesque's more working-class image. While Trudeau claimed to welcome the "clarity" provided by the PQ victory, the unexpected rise of the sovereignist movement became, in his view, his biggest challenge.

As the PQ began to take power, Trudeau faced the prolonged failure of his marriage, which was covered in lurid detail on a day-by-day basis by the English language press. Trudeau's reserve was seen as dignified by contemporaries and his poll numbers actually rose during the height of coverage, but aides felt the personal tensions left him uncharacteristically emotional and prone to outbursts.

=== Economic policy ===
Trudeau's first government implemented many procedural reforms to make Parliament and the Liberal caucus meetings run more efficiently, significantly expanded the size and role of the prime minister's office, and substantially expanded social-welfare programs.

==== Deficit spending ====
Trudeau's government ran large budget deficits throughout its time in office. The government's first budget in 1968 produced a deficit of $667 million, while the 1969 budget produced a surplus of $140 million. However, the 1970 budget (which produced a deficit of over $1 billion) marked the start of consecutive budget deficits ran by the Trudeau government; the budget would not be balanced until 1997. By the time Trudeau's first tenure ended in 1979, the deficit grew to $12 billion.

List of budgets passed by the Pierre Trudeau government from 1968 to 1979 $ represent Canadian billions of unadjusted dollars
Budget	1968	1969	1970	1971	1972	1973	1974	1975	1976	1977	Apr. 1978	Nov. 1978
Surplus		$0.14										
Deficit	$0.667		$1.016	$1.786	$1.901	$2.211	$2.225	$6.204	$6.897	$10.879	$13.029	$11.967

==== Social programs ====
In 1971, Trudeau's government greatly expanded unemployment insurance, making coverage nearly universal as coverage for the Canadian labour force jumped to 96 percent from 75 percent. The system was sometimes called the 8/42, because one had to work for eight weeks (with at least 20 hours per week), and wait two weeks, to get benefits for the other 42 weeks of the year. This expansion also opened the UI program up to maternity, sickness, and retirement benefits, covered seasonal workers for the first time, and allowed mothers to receive up to 15 weeks of benefits if they had 20 or more insurable weeks. The reforms increased the maximum benefit period to 50 weeks, though the benefit duration was calculated using a complex formula depending on labour force participation and the regional and national unemployment rates. In 1977, the government simplified the benefit duration formula but introduced a variable entrance requirement dependent on the unemployment rate in the applicant's region; the changes also mandated that workers in areas with low unemployment regions work twice as long to be eligible for benefits as workers in high unemployment regions.

Trudeau's government expanded the Registered retirement savings plan to all Canadians in 1973. In 1975, his government introduced the Spouse's Allowance, an income-tested supplement part of Old Age Security (OAS). Spouses or common-law partners of OAS or Guaranteed Income Supplement (GIS) recipients were eligible to receive the Spouse's Allowance on the condition that the new benefit's recipients are between 60 and 64 years old and both spouses have a combined income that is considered "low income".

In 1977, Trudeau's government established the financial program Established Programs Financing to help finance the provincially-run healthcare and post-secondary education system, through transfer payments, by cash and tax points. This system lasted until 1995.

==== Taxation ====
In 1969, Trudeau's first finance minister, Edgar Benson, introduced a white paper on tax reform which included tax deductions for child care and advocated shifting the tax burden from the poor to the wealthy. Measures to fulfill the latter proposal included a capital gains tax, which was severely criticized by corporate Canada and the business community (notably Israel Asper). The bill was debated in Parliament for over a year, with its more radical proposals being removed in parliamentary committee. The reforms managed to be passed through the use of closure, with the capital gains tax (that had an inclusion rate of 50 percent) coming into effect on January 1, 1972, as prescribed by the 1971 budget. Also implemented in 1972 was the child care expense deduction which allowed for a deduction of up to $500 per child. As Benson had now become a political liability, Trudeau replaced him with John Turner (who was seen as a "Business Liberal") in 1972.

In 1973, Trudeau's government fully indexed the person income tax system (both the exemptions and the brackets) to the rate of inflation. The indexation was made effective in 1974; during that year, inflation had jumped from six percent to double digits. The government also implemented three personal income tax cuts from 1973 to 1975. Trudeau did not make any changes to the corporate income tax rate during his first tenure, as the rate remained at 37 percent.

Trudeau's government in 1979 restructured family allowances by increasing the role of the tax system in child support and decreasing the role of family allowances. The government established an annual Refundable Child Tax Credit of $200 for families with incomes of $18,000 or less. As incomes increased above this level, benefits would be taxed away to disappear completely at $26,000. Since the median income for families during this time was $19,500, the majority of families received some benefit from the new program.

==== Inflation ====
Canada, among many other countries, experienced high inflation throughout the 1970s as a result of the quadrupling of global oil prices (and therefore a significant rise in gasoline prices) caused by the October 1973 oil embargo after the Yom Kippur War. Throughout the decade, prices rose by an average of about 8 percent annually. In December 1974, inflation in Canada peaked at 12.7 percent.

While popular with the electorate, Trudeau's promised minor reforms had little effect on the growing rate of inflation, and he struggled with conflicting advice on the crisis. In September 1975, Finance Minister John Turner resigned over refusing to implement wage and price controls. In December 1975, in an embarrassing about-face, Trudeau and new finance minister Donald Macdonald introduced wage and price controls by passing the Anti-Inflation Act, despite campaigning against them in the 1974 election. Amongst its many controls, it limited pay increases for federal government employees and employees in companies with over 500 workers to 10 percent in 1976, 8 percent in 1977, and 6 percent in 1978. The Act also established the anti-inflation board which oversaw the implementation of wage and price controls and had the ability to recommend decreases in prices of goods, wage cuts, and rebates to customers of various services. The breadth of the legislation, which touched on many powers traditionally considered the purview of the provinces, prompted a Supreme Court reference that only upheld the legislation as an emergency requiring Federal intervention under the British North America Act. During the annual 1975 Christmas interview with CTV, Trudeau discussed the economy, citing market failures and stating that more state intervention would be necessary. However, the academic wording and hypothetical solutions posed during the complex discussion led much of the public to believe he had declared capitalism itself a failure, creating a lasting distrust among increasingly neoliberal business leaders. The controls lasted until 1978 and the anti-inflation board was dissolved in 1979.

=== Energy policy ===
On September 4, 1973, Trudeau requested Western Canadian provinces to agree to a voluntary freeze on oil prices during the ongoing Arab oil embargo. Nine days after, the Trudeau government imposed a 40-cent tax on every barrel of Canadian oil exported to the United States to combat rising inflation and oil prices. The tax was equivalent to the difference between domestic and international oil prices, and the revenues were used to subsidize oil imports for Eastern refiners. The Premier of oil-rich Alberta, Peter Lougheed, called the decision "the most discriminatory action taken by a federal government against a particular province in the entire history of Confederation." While revenues decreased for Western provinces (particularly Alberta) and for the petroleum industry, Trudeau's government subsidized Eastern consumers, angering Alberta, who successfully fought for control of its natural resources in 1930.

Logo of Petro-Canada

The 1970s energy crises led to rapid increases in energy resource prices, which produced windfall profits in the energy-rich western provinces. The November 1974 budget from Trudeau's government terminated the deduction of provincial natural resources royalties from federal tax. According to Roy Romanow—then Saskatchewan's attorney general—this move kicked off the "resource wars", a confrontation between Trudeau's federal government and the prairie provinces over the control of and revenues from natural resource extraction and energy production.

In the early 1970s, the petroleum industry was largely under foreign (mainly American) control, the recent discovery of oil in Alaska put corporate pressure on the Canadian Arctic, and Canada's energy sector increasingly focused on North American rather than domestic needs. Trudeau's government initially rejected the idea of creating a nationalized oil company (which was perceived to secure supplies, improve revenue collection, and give governments better information on the global energy market), arguing it would be costly and inefficient. However, after the late 1973 oil crisis saw global oil prices quadruple, questions arose about whether Canada should continue importing oil. Though Canada also exported oil at times, the provinces of Quebec and Atlantic Canada were at risk of a cut-off of imports; as a result, Canada was in need of knowing more about its potential to produce energy. In late October 1973, Trudeau's government adopted a motion from the New Democratic Party (which the Trudeau minority government relied on for support) to establish a nationalized oil company. The Petro-Canada Act was passed in 1975 (under a Trudeau majority government), resulting in the creation of a new crown corporation, Petro-Canada. Petro-Canada was mandated to acquire imported oil supplies, take part in energy research and development, and engage in downstream activities such as refining and marketing. The corporation started with an initial $1.5 billion in capital and had preferential access to debt capital as "an agent of Her Majesty". Trudeau's government gave itself authority over Petro-Canada's capital budget and its corporate strategy, making the company its policy arm; the government also wanted the company to be mainly active on the frontiers (the oil sands, the Arctic, and the East Coast offshore areas) rather than Western Canada, where most Canadian oil is extracted. In 1976, Trudeau appointed his friend, Maurice Strong, to become the first chair of the company.

=== Foreign policy ===
In foreign affairs, Trudeau kept Canada in the North Atlantic Treaty Organization (NATO), but often pursued an independent path in international relations.

Trudeau was the first world leader to meet John Lennon and his wife Yoko Ono on their 1969 "tour for world peace". Lennon said, after talking with Trudeau for 50 minutes, that Trudeau was "a beautiful person" and that "if all politicians were like Pierre Trudeau, there would be world peace". The diplomat John G. H. Halstead who worked as a close adviser to Trudeau for a time described him as a man who never read any of the policy papers submitted by the External Affairs department, instead preferring short briefings on the issues before meeting other leaders and that Trudeau usually tried to "wing" his way through international meetings by being witty. Halstead stated that Trudeau viewed foreign policy as "only for dabbing", saying he much preferred domestic affairs.

==== NATO ====
In August 1968, the Trudeau government expressed disapproval of the Soviet invasion of Czechoslovakia, having the Canadian delegation at the United Nations vote for a resolution condemning the invasion, which failed to pass owing to a Soviet veto. However, Trudeau made it clear that he did not want an intensified Cold War as a result of the invasion, and worked to avoid a rupture with Moscow. In a speech in December 1968, Trudeau asked: "Can we assume Russia wants war because it invaded Czechoslovakia?".

In 1968–1969, Trudeau wanted to pull Canada out of NATO, arguing that the MAD (Mutually Assured Destruction) caused by a Soviet-American nuclear exchange made it highly unlikely that the Soviet Union would ever invade West Germany, thereby making NATO into an expensive irrelevance in his view. In March 1969, Trudeau visited Washington to meet President Richard Nixon, where the meeting went very civilly, through Nixon came to intensely dislike Trudeau over time, referring to him in 1971 as "that asshole Trudeau" Nixon made it clear to Trudeau that a Canada that remained in NATO would be taken more seriously in Washington than a Canada that left NATO. Trudeau himself noted during a speech given before the National Press Club during the same visit that the United States was by far Canada's largest trading partner, saying: "Living next to you is in some way like sleeping with an elephant; no matter how friendly and even-tempered the beast, one is affected by every twitch and grunt".

The NATO question badly divided the cabinet. The diplomat Marcel Cadieux accused Trudeau of being "ne semble pas croire du tout au danger soviétique". As a diplomat, the devout Catholic Cadieux had served on the International Control Commission in 1954–55, where his experiences of witnessing the exodus of 2 million Vietnamese Catholics from North Vietnam to South Vietnam made him into a very firm anti-Communist. In late March 1969, Trudeau's cabinet was torn by debate as ministers divided into pro-NATO and anti-NATO camps, and Trudeau's own feelings were with the latter. The defence minister Léo Cadieux threatened to resign in protest if Canada did leave NATO, leading Trudeau who wanted to keep a French-Canadian in a high-profile portfolio such as the Defence department, to meet Cadieux on 2 April 1969 to discuss a possible compromise. Trudeau and Cadieux agreed to the compromise that Canada would stay in NATO, but drastically cut back its contributions, despite warnings from Ross Campbell, the Canadian member of the NATO Council, that the scale of the cuts envisioned would break Canada's treaty commitments. Ultimately, the fact the United States would be more favourably disposed to a Canada in NATO and the need to maintain cabinet unity led Trudeau to decide, despite his own inclinations, to stay in NATO. After much discussion within the cabinet, Trudeau finally declared that Canada would stay within NATO after all on 3 April 1969, but he would cut back Canada's forces within Europe by 50%. The way that Canada cut its NATO contributions by 50% caused tensions with other NATO allies with the British government of Prime Minister Harold Wilson making a public protest at the cuts.

Trudeau had an especially close friendship with the Social Democratic West German chancellor Helmut Schmidt, whom he greatly liked both for his left-wing politics and as a practical politician who was more concerned about getting things done rather than with ideological questions. Schmidt was sympathetic towards Trudeau's "rebalancing" concept, telling Trudeau that he wanted West Germany to have two North American partners instead of one, and promised at a 1975 meeting to use West German influence within the EEC to grant Canada better trade terms in exchange for Canada spending more on its NATO commitments. After meeting Schmidt, Trudeau performed a volte-face on NATO, speaking at a press conference of how much he valued NATO as an alliance that was established for collective security in Europe. To show his approval of Schmidt, Trudeau not only agreed to spend more on NATO, but insisted that the Canadian Army buy the German-built Leopard tanks, which thereby boosted the West German arms industry, over the opposition of the Finance department, which felt that buying the Leopard tanks was wasteful. Schmidt's support was especially welcome as Wilson, once again back as the British prime minister, proved unwilling to lobby for the EEC lowering tariffs on Canadian goods, merely saying that he was willing "to interpret Canadian policy" to the other EEC leaders. By contrast, the West German foreign minister Hans-Dietrich Genscher gave Trudeau a firm promise of West German support for an EEC-Canadian economic agreement. The major hold-out was France, which was stoutly opposed to an EEC-Canadian agreement, seeing giving EEC market access to Canadian agriculture as a threat to French agriculture. In July 1976 a Canadian-EEC Framework Economic Agreement was signed, which came into effect on 1 October 1976. Trudeau hoped the Framework Agreement would be the first step towards a Canadian-EEC free trade agreement, but the EEC proved to be uninterested in free trade with Canada.

==== United States ====
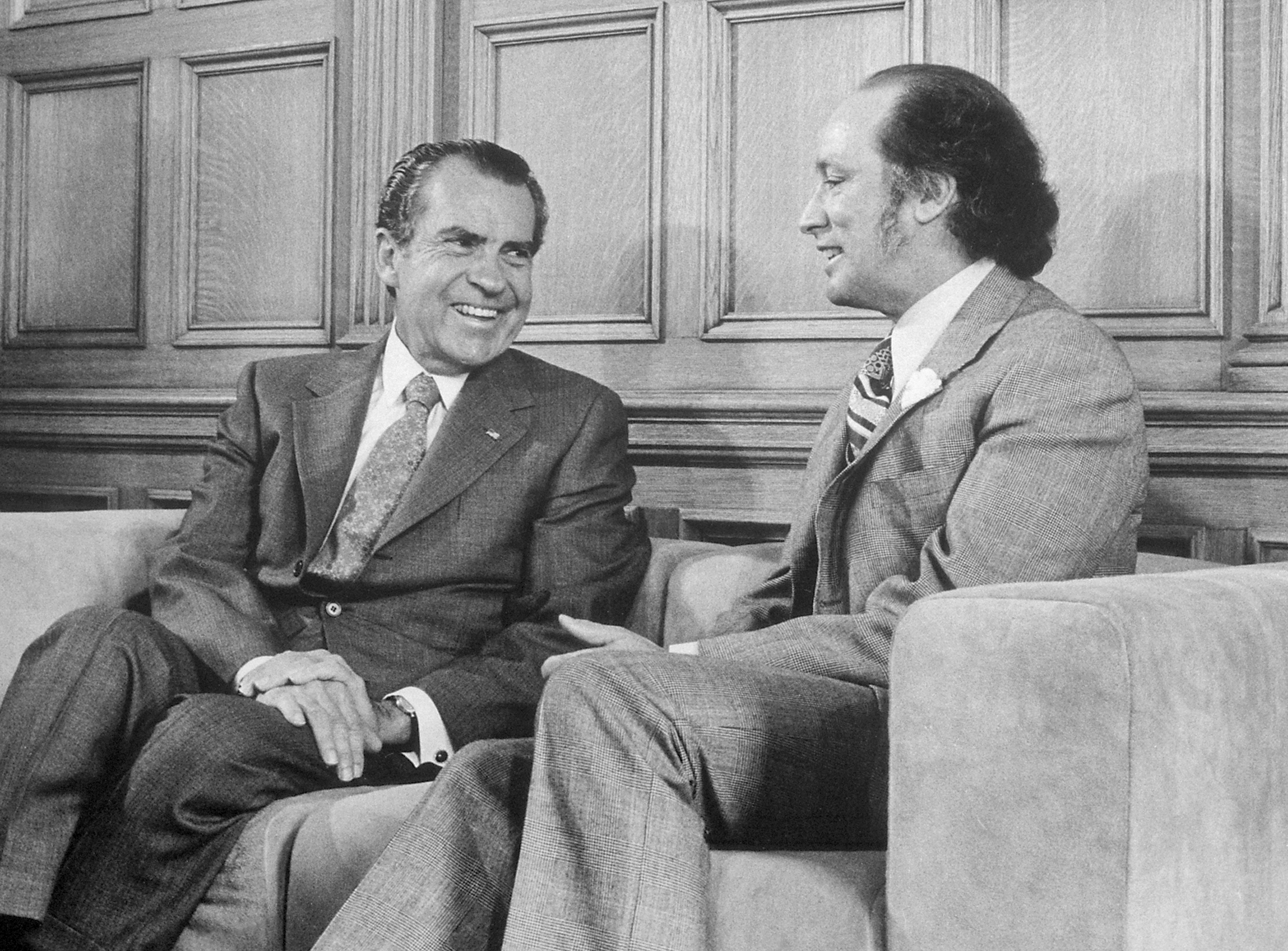
Trudeau in his office in Ottawa with U.S. President Richard Nixon on April 14, 1972

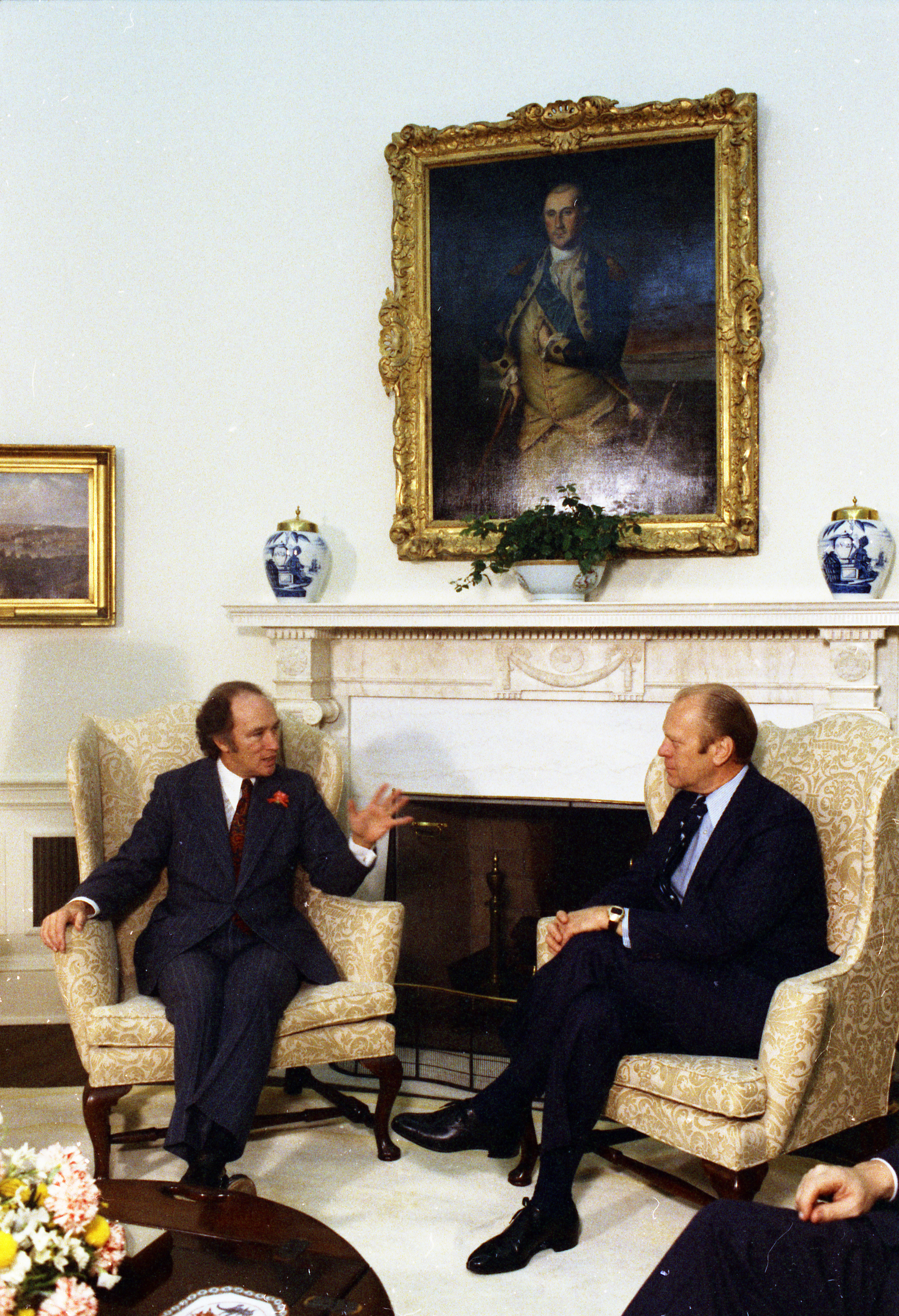
Trudeau with U.S. President Gerald Ford in the Oval Office on December 4, 1974

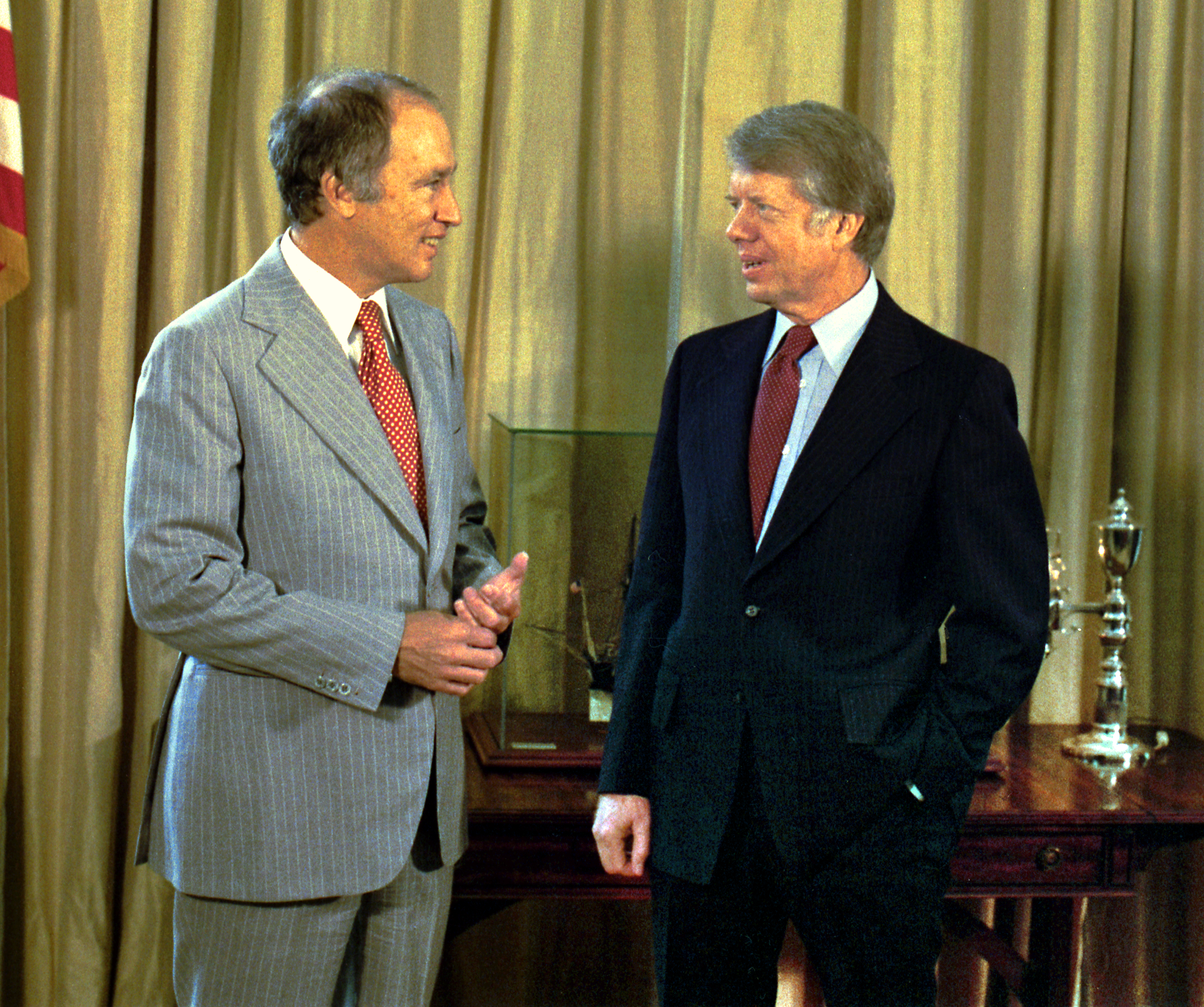
Trudeau with U.S. President Jimmy Carter in the Oval Office on September 9, 1977

Relations with the United States deteriorated on many points in the Nixon years (1969–1974), including trade disputes, defence agreements, energy, fishing, the environment, cultural imperialism, and foreign policy. They changed for the better when Trudeau and President Jimmy Carter (1977–1981) found a better rapport. The late 1970s saw a more sympathetic American attitude toward Canadian political and economic needs, the pardoning of draft evaders who had moved to Canada, and the passing of old sore points such as Watergate and the Vietnam War. Canada more than ever welcomed American investments during the "stagflation" (high inflation and high unemployment at the same time) that hurt both nations in the 1970s.

Trudeau continued his attempts at increasing Canada's international profile, including joining the G7 group of major economic powers in 1976 at the behest of U.S. President Gerald Ford.

On January 4, 1973, Trudeau voted for a resolution in the House of Commons that condemned the American Christmas bombings against North Vietnam between December 18 and 29, 1972. As a consequence, Canadian-American relations which were already under stress because of the mutual contempt between Nixon and Trudeau, reached a post-war nadir. Nixon was infuriated by the resolution and refused to see the Canadian ambassador in Washington in protest. Prompted by Halstead, who was known as a proponent of economic "rebalancing" by seeking closer economic ties with the EEC, Trudeau made a visit to Brussels in October 1973 to see François-Xavier Ortoli, the president of the European Commission. Ortoli refused Trudeau's request for a free trade agreement with the EEC, saying that was out of the question, but did agree to open talks on lowering tariffs between Canada and the EEC.

==== United Kingdom ====
Trudeau attached little importance to relations with Britain. While he shot down a suggestion by one of his ministers to turn Canada into a republic in 1968, he treated the monarchy with a certain bemused contempt. Britain's decision in 1973 to join the European Economic Community (EEC) as the European Union was then known, confirmed Trudeau's view that the United Kingdom was a declining power that had little to offer Canada while the way that Japan had replaced Britain as Canada's second-largest trading partner was taken as further confirmation of these views. However, Trudeau was attached to the Commonwealth, believing it was an international body that allowed Canada to project influence in the Third World.

==== China ====
Trudeau established Canadian diplomatic relations with the People's Republic of China before the United States did in 1979, and went on an official visit to Beijing. On February 10, 1969, the government announced its wish to establish diplomatic relations with the People's Republic, and Trudeau was mortified when the Chinese refused to respond at first, which made him look foolish. Unknown to Trudeau, the Chinese diplomatic corps had been so thoroughly purged during the Cultural Revolution that the Chinese Foreign Ministry barely functioned by early 1969. On February 19, 1969, the Chinese finally responded and agreed to open talks in Stockholm on establishing diplomatic relations, which began on April 3, 1969. Trudeau expected the negotiations to be a mere formality, but relations were not finally established until October 1970. The delay was largely because the Chinese insisted that Canada have no relations whatsoever with "the Chiang Kai-shek gang" as they called the Kuomintang regime in Taiwan and agree to support the Chinese position that Taiwan was a part of the People's Republic, a position that caused problems on the Canadian side as it implied Canadian support for China's viewpoint that it had the right to take Taiwan by force into the People's Republic. On October 10, 1970, a statement was issued by the External Affairs department in Ottawa saying: "The Chinese government reaffirms that Taiwan is an inalienable part of the territory of the People's Republic of China. The Canadian government takes note of the Chinese position". After the statement was issued, China and Canada established diplomatic relations on the same day. In October 1973, Trudeau visited Beijing to meet Mao Zedong and Zhou Enlai, where Trudeau was hailed as "old friend"-a term of high approval in China.

In 1976, Trudeau, succumbing to pressure from the Chinese government, issued an order barring Taiwan from participating as China in the 1976 Montreal Olympics, although technically it was a matter for the IOC. His action strained relations with the United States – from President Ford, future President Carter and the press – and subjected Canada to international condemnation and shame.

==== Apartheid ====
As a member of the Commonwealth, Canada was also expected to take a position on the government of South Africa (which had belonged to the Commonwealth until 1961) and whose apartheid system had attracted worldwide criticism. Trudeau's Foreign Policy for Canadians white paper of April 1968 had declared that "social justice" in South Africa was a key priority, but much to the dismay of anti-apartheid activists, Trudeau never imposed sanctions on South Africa. Trudeau was often criticized for his "duplicity" on South Africa as he criticized apartheid, but refused to impose sanctions on South Africa.

In 1970–71, the Commonwealth was threatened with a split as a number of African Commonwealth nations supported by India denounced Britain's policy of selling arms to South Africa, which the British government argued was necessary because South Africa was one of the world's largest gold producers while the South African government was anti-Communist and pro-Western. The Labour Wilson government had imposed an arms embargo on South Africa in 1964, which the new Conservative government ended in 1970. A number of African Commonwealth nations led by President Kenneth Kaunda of Zambia and President Julius Nyerere of Tanzania threatened to leave the Commonwealth if Britain continued with the arms sales to South Africa. When British prime minister Edward Heath visited Ottawa in December 1970, his meetings with Trudeau went badly. In what was described as a "no holds-barred" style, Trudeau told Heath that the British arms sales to white supremacist South Africa were threatening the unity of the Commonwealth. At a Commonwealth summit in Singapore between January 14-22, 1971, Trudeau argued that apartheid was not sustainable in the long run given that the black population of South Africa vastly outnumbered the white population, and it was extremely myopic for Britain to be supporting South Africa, given that majority rule in South Africa was inevitable. However, Trudeau worked for a compromise to avoid a split in the Commonwealth, arguing that the Commonwealth needed to do more to pressure South Africa to end apartheid peacefully, saying that a "race war" in South Africa would be the worse possible way to end apartheid. The conference ended with the compromise agreement that Britain would complete its existing arms contracts to South Africa, but henceforward sell no more weapons to South Africa; ultimately the British only sold South Africa five attack helicopters. Lee Kuan Yew, the prime minister of Singapore and the host of the conference later praised Trudeau for his efforts at the Commonwealth summit to hold together the Commonwealth despite the passions caused by the South African issue.

==== Israel ====
In November 1978, the Israeli prime minister Menachem Begin visited Canada and during a speech on November 12, 1978, to a Jewish group in Toronto called upon Canadian Jews to lobby to have Canada move its embassy from Tel Aviv to Jerusalem, saying that Jerusalem was the true capital of Israel, and that Jews should vote in the 1979 election for the candidates who wanted the Canadian embassy in Jerusalem, likely referring to PC leader Joe Clark. Trudeau saw Begin's speech as interference in Canada's internal politics, and came to develop what was described as a "really passionate hatred" of Begin.

==== Trudeau and Castro ====
Trudeau was known as a friend of Fidel Castro, the leader of Cuba. In January 1976, Trudeau visited Cuba to meet Castro and shouted to a crowd in Havana "Viva Cuba! Viva Castro!" ("Long Live Cuba! Long Live Castro!"). In November 1975, Cuba had intervened in the Angolan Civil War on the side of the Marxist MPLA government supported by the Soviet Union which was fighting against the UNITA and FNLA guerrilla movements supported by the United States, South Africa and Zaire (the modern Democratic Republic of the Congo). Though both Zaire and South Africa had also intervened in Angola, sending in troops to support the FLNA and UNITA respectively, it was the Cuban intervention in Angola that caused the controversy in the West. Many people in the West saw the Cuban intervention as "aggression", and as a power play by the Soviet Union to win a sphere of influence in Africa. Angola was amply endowed with oil, and many saw the victory of the MPLA/Cuban forces in the first round of the Angolan civil war in 1975-76 as a major blow to Western interests in Africa. Trudeau's remarks in Havana were widely seen in the West as not only expressing approval of Cuba's Communist government, but also the Cuban intervention in Angola. In fact, Trudeau did press Castro in private to pull his troops out of Angola, only for Castro to insist that Cuba would pull its forces out of Angola only when South Africa likewise pulled its forces out of not only Angola, but also Southwest Africa (modern Namibia) as well. Trudeau's embrace of Castro attracted much criticism in the United States, which allowed Trudeau to pose as a leader who was "standing up" to the United States without seriously damaging American-Canadian relations.

=== Re-elections ===
==== 1972 election ====
On September 1, 1972, over four years into the Liberals' five-year mandate, Trudeau called an election for October 30. At the start of the campaign, polls showed the Liberals 10 points ahead of the Progressive Conservatives led by Robert Stanfield, who previously lost to Trudeau in the 1968 election. However, the results produced a Liberal minority government, with the Liberals winning 109 seats compared to the PCs' 107; this was one of the closest elections in Canadian history. Trudeaumania from the 1968 election had worn off, not least because of a slumping economy and rising unemployment. The New Democratic Party led by David Lewis held the balance of power.

==== 1974 election ====
In May 1974, the House of Commons passed a motion of no confidence in the Trudeau government, defeating its budget bill after Trudeau intentionally antagonized Stanfield and Lewis. The election of 1974 focused mainly on the current economic recession. Stanfield proposed the immediate introduction of 90-day wage and price controls to help end the increasing inflation Canada was currently facing. Trudeau mocked the proposal, saying to a newspaper reporter that it was the equivalent of a magician saying "Zap! You're frozen", and instead promoted a variety of small tax cuts to curb inflation. According to Trudeau's biographer John English, NDP supporters scared of wage controls moved toward the Liberals during the campaign. Trudeau, in an abrupt reversal, would implement wage and price controls in December 1975 through the passing of the Anti-Inflation Act.

The Liberals were re-elected with a majority government with 141 of the 264 seats, prompting Stanfield's resignation as PC leader in 1976. The Liberals won no seats in Alberta, though, where the province's premier, Peter Lougheed, was a vociferous opponent of Trudeau's 1974 budget.

=== Defeat in 1979 ===
As the 1970s wore on, growing public exhaustion towards Trudeau's personality and the country's constitutional debates caused his poll numbers to fall rapidly in the late 1970s. At the 1978 G7 summit, he discussed strategies for the upcoming election with West German chancellor Helmut Schmidt, who advised him to announce several spending cuts to quell criticism of the large deficits his government was running.

After a series of defeats in by-elections in 1978, Trudeau waited as long as he could to call a statutory general election in 1979. He finally did so in 1979, only two months from the five-year limit provided under the British North America Act. In the election of 1979, Trudeau and the Liberals faced declining poll numbers and the Joe Clark–led Progressive Conservatives focusing on "pocketbook" issues. Trudeau and his advisors, to contrast with the mild-mannered Clark, based their campaign on Trudeau's decisive personality and his grasp of the Constitution file, despite the general public's apparent wariness of both. The traditional Liberal rally at Maple Leaf Gardens saw Trudeau stressing the importance of major constitutional reform to general ennui, and his campaign "photo-ops" were typically surrounded by picket lines and protesters. Though polls portended disaster, Clark's struggles justifying his party's populist platform and a strong Trudeau performance in the election debate helped bring the Liberals to the point of contention.

Though winning the popular vote by four points, the Liberal vote was concentrated in Quebec and faltered in industrial Ontario, allowing the PCs to win the seat-count handily and form a minority government.

== Second premiership (1980–1984) ==
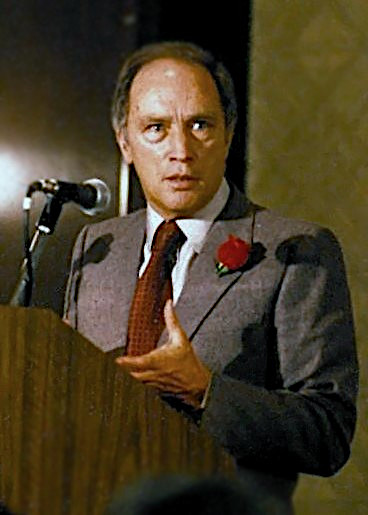
Prime Minister Trudeau in 1980

After only seven months in power, Clark's government collapsed after their first budget was defeated in the House of Commons, triggering an election for February 18, 1980. In the election, Trudeau led the Liberals to a majority government. The Liberal victory highlighted a sharp geographical divide in the country: the party had won no seats west of Manitoba. Trudeau, in an attempt to represent Western interests, offered to form a coalition government with Ed Broadbent's NDP, which had won 22 seats in the west, but was rebuffed by Broadbent out of fear the party would have no influence in a majority government.

=== 1980 Quebec referendum ===
The first challenge Trudeau faced upon re-election was the May 20, 1980 Quebec referendum on Québec sovereignty, called by the Parti Québécois government under René Lévesque. Trudeau immediately initiated federal involvement in the referendum, reversing the Clark government's policy of leaving the issue to the Quebec Liberals and Claude Ryan. He appointed Jean Chrétien as the nominal spokesman for the federal government, helping to push the "Non" cause to working-class voters who tuned out the intellectual Ryan and Trudeau. Unlike Ryan and the Liberals, he refused to acknowledge the legitimacy of the referendum question, and noted that the "association" required consent from the other provinces.

In the debates in the legislature during the campaign leading up to the referendum Lévesque said that Trudeau's middle name was Scottish, and that Trudeau's aristocratic upbringing proved that he was more Scottish than French. A week prior to the referendum, Trudeau delivered one of his most well-known speeches, in which he extolled the virtues of federalism and questioned the ambiguous language of the referendum question. He described the origin of the name Canadian. Trudeau promised a new constitutional agreement should Quebec decide to stay in Canada, in which English-speaking Canadians would have to listen to valid concerns made by the Québécois. On May 20, sixty percent of Quebecers voted to remain in Canada. Following the announcement of the results, Trudeau said that he "had never been so proud to be a Quebecer and a Canadian".

=== Economic and energy policy ===
The Trudeau government's first budget after returning to power, delivered in October 1980 by Finance Minister Allan MacEachen, was one of a series of unpopular budgets delivered in response to the oil shock of 1979 and the ensuing severe global economic recession which began at the start of the year. In his budget speech, MacEachen said that the global oil price shocks—in 1973 and again in 1979—had caused a "sharp renewal of inflationary forces and real income losses" in Canada and in the industrial world...They are not just Canadian problems ... they are world-wide problems." Leaders of developed countries raised their concerns at the Venice Summit, at meetings of Finance Ministers of the International Monetary Fund (IMF) and the Organisation for Economic Co-operation and Development (OECD). The Bank of Canada wrote that there was a "deeply troubling air of uncertainty and anxiety" about the economy.

==== National Energy Program ====
In the 1980 budget, the National Energy Program was introduced. It became one of the Liberals' most contentious policies. The NEP was fiercely protested by the Western provinces and was seen as unfairly depriving western provinces of the full economic benefit from their oil and gas resources, in order to pay for nationwide social programs, and make regional transfer payments to poorer parts of the country. Sentiments of this kind were especially strong in oil-rich Alberta where unemployment rose from 4% to 10% following passage of the NEP. The western provinces blamed the devastating oil bust of the 1980s on the NEP which led to what many termed "Western alienation." Peter Lougheed, then premier of Alberta, entered into tough negotiations with Trudeau and they reached a revenue-sharing agreement on energy in 1982. Estimates have placed Alberta's losses between $50 billion and $100 billion because of the NEP.

==== Spending ====
Amongst the policies introduced by Trudeau's last term in office were an expansion in government support for Canada's poorest citizens. By the time Trudeau left office in 1984, the budget deficit was at a whopping $37 billion. Trudeau's first budget in 1968 only ran a deficit of $667 million. Inflation and unemployment marred much of Trudeau's tenure as prime minister. When Trudeau took office in 1968 Canada had a debt of $18 billion (24% of GDP) which was largely left over from World War II, when he left office in 1984, that debt stood at $200 billion (46% of GDP), an increase of 83% in real terms.

List of budgets passed by the Pierre Trudeau government from 1980 to 1984 $ represent Canadian billions of unadjusted dollars
Budget	1980	1981	1982	1983	1984
Deficit	$14.556	$15.674	$29.049	$32.363	$37.167

=== Patriation of the constitution ===
In 1982, Trudeau succeeded in patriating the Constitution. In response to a formal request from the Canadian Houses of Parliament, the British Parliament passed an act ceding to the governments of Canada the full responsibility for amending Canada's Constitution. Earlier in his tenure, he had met with opposition from the provincial governments, most notably with the Victoria Charter. Provincial premiers were united in their concerns regarding an amending formula, a court-enforced Charter of Rights, and a further devolution of powers to the provinces. In 1980, Chrétien was tasked with creating a constitutional settlement following the Quebec referendum in which Quebecers voted to remain in Canada.

After chairing a series of increasingly acrimonious conferences with first ministers on the issue, Trudeau announced the intention of the federal government to proceed with a request to the British parliament to patriate the constitution, with additions to be approved by a referendum without input from provincial governments. Trudeau was backed by the NDP, Ontario Premier Bill Davis, and New Brunswick Premier Richard Hatfield and was opposed by the remaining premiers and PC leader Joe Clark. After numerous provincial governments challenged the legality of the decision using their reference power, conflicting decisions prompted a Supreme Court decision that stated unilateral patriation was legal, but was in contravention of a constitutional convention that the provinces be consulted and have general agreement to the changes.

After the court decision, which prompted some reservations in the British parliament of accepting a unilateral request, Trudeau agreed to meet with the premiers one more time before proceeding. At the meeting, Trudeau reached an agreement with nine of the premiers on patriating the constitution and implementing the Canadian Charter of Rights and Freedoms, with the caveat that Parliament and the provincial legislatures would have the ability to use a notwithstanding clause to protect some laws from judicial oversight. The notable exception was Lévesque, who, Trudeau believed, would never have signed an agreement. The objection of the Quebec government to the new constitutional provisions became a source of continued acrimony between the federal and Quebec governments, and would forever stain Trudeau's reputation amongst nationalists in the province.

The Constitution Act, 1982, including the Canadian Charter of Rights and Freedoms, was proclaimed by Queen Elizabeth II, as Queen of Canada, on April 17, 1982. With the enactment of the Canada Act 1982, the British Parliament ceded all authority over Canada to the governments of Canada. The Constitution Act, 1982, part of the Canada Act 1982, established the supremacy of the Constitution of Canada, which now could only be amended by the federal and provincial governments, under the amending formula established by the Constitution Act, 1982.

The Charter represented the final step in Trudeau's liberal vision of a fully independent Canada based on fundamental human rights and the protection of individual freedoms as well as those of linguistic and cultural minorities. Section 35 of the Constitution Act, 1982, has clarified issues of aboriginal and equality rights, including establishing the previously denied aboriginal rights of Métis. Section 15, dealing with equality rights, has been used to remedy societal discrimination against minority groups. The coupling of the direct and indirect influences of the charter has meant that it has grown to influence every aspect of Canadian life and the override (notwithstanding clause) of the Charter has been infrequently used.

=== Foreign policy ===
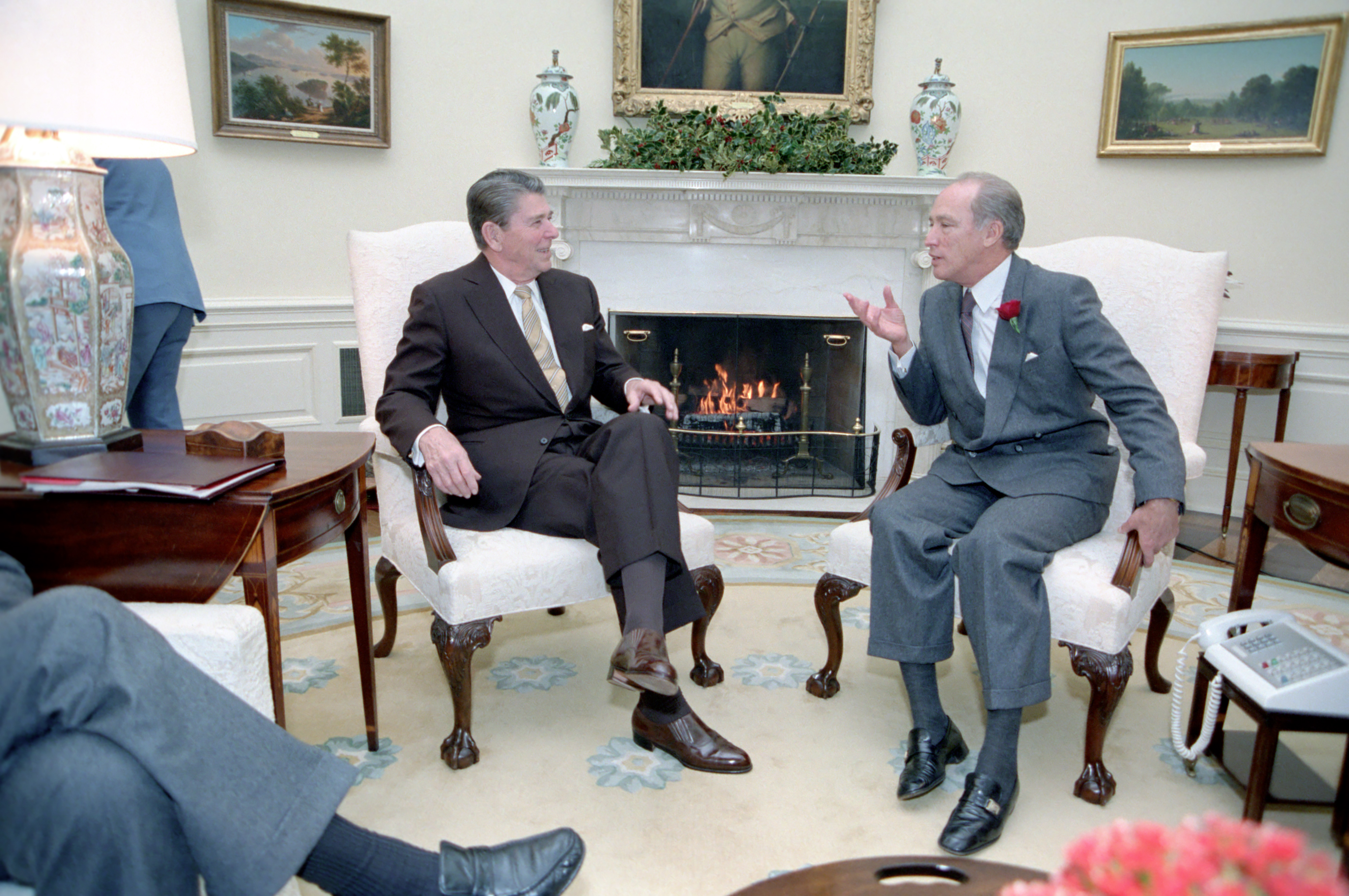
Trudeau with U.S. President Ronald Reagan in the Oval Office on December 15, 1983

The left-leaning Trudeau often disagreed with the conservative U.S. President Ronald Reagan. Wary about increased American influence in Canada, Trudeau opposed Reagan's idea of a North American free trade agreement. At the 1983 Williamsburg Economic Summit, Trudeau and French President François Mitterrand united to oppose a joint statement (which Reagan supported) which supported deploying a class of nuclear weapons while hoping they could be eliminated in the future through negotiations with the Soviet Union.

During its final term in 1980–1984, Trudeau's government took markedly pro-Palestinian positions as Trudeau was described as being "pro-Arab" by this point.

=== Resignation ===
By 1984, the Progressive Conservatives held a substantial lead in opinion polls under their new leader Brian Mulroney, and polls indicated that the Liberals faced all-but-certain defeat if Trudeau led them into the next election.

On February 29, 1984, a day after what he described as a walk through the snowy streets of Ottawa, Trudeau announced he would not lead the Liberals into the next election. He was frequently known to use the term "walk in the snow" as a trope; he claimed to have taken a similar walk in December 1979 before deciding to take the Liberals into the 1980 election.

Trudeau formally retired on June 30, ending his 15-year tenure as prime minister. He was succeeded by John Turner, a former Cabinet minister under both Trudeau and Lester Pearson. Before handing power to Turner, Trudeau took the unusual step of appointing Liberal Senators from Western provinces to his Cabinet. He advised Governor General Jeanne Sauvé to appoint over 200 Liberals to patronage positions. He and Turner then crafted a legal agreement calling for Turner to advise an additional 70 patronage appointments. The sheer volume of appointments, combined with questions about the appointees' qualifications, led to condemnation from across the political spectrum. However, an apparent rebound in the polls prompted Turner to call an election for September 1984, almost a year before it was due.

Turner's appointment deal with Trudeau came back to haunt the Liberals at the English-language debate, when Mulroney demanded that Turner apologize for not advising that the appointments be cancelled—advice that Sauvé would have been required to follow by convention. Turner claimed that "I had no option" but to let the appointments stand, prompting Mulroney to tell him, "You had an option, sir–to say 'no'–and you chose to say 'yes' to the old attitudes and the old stories of the Liberal Party." In the election, Mulroney won the largest majority government (by total number of seats) and second-largest majority (by proportion of seats) in Canadian history. The Liberals, with Turner as leader, lost 95 seats–at the time, the worst defeat of a sitting government at the federal level (by proportion of seats) at the time.

== See also ==
- Premiership of Jean Chrétien
- Premiership of Paul Martin
- Premiership of Stephen Harper
- Premiership of Justin Trudeau
- Premiership of Mark Carney

== Sources ==
- Bothwell, Robert; Granatstein, Jack (1991). Pirouette: Pierre Trudeau and Canadian Foreign Policy. Toronto: University of Toronto Press. ISBN 9780802068736.
- Bothwell, Robert; Granatstein, Jack (2017). Trudeau's World: Insiders Reflect on Foreign Policy, Trade, and Defence, 1968-84. Vancouver: University of British Columbia Press. ISBN 978-0774836401.
- "John, Yoko think PM is "beautiful"". The Leader-Post. Regina, Saskatchewan. The Canadian Press. p. 1.
- Cohen, Andrew; Granatstein, Jack Lawrence (1998). Trudeau's shadow : the life and legacy of Pierre Elliott Trudeau. Toronto: Random House Canada.
- English, John (2009). Just Watch Me: The Life of Pierre Elliott Trudeau Volume Two: 1968–2000. Toronto: Knopf Canada. ISBN 978-0-676-97523-9.
- "Forty years on, Trudeaumania still lives". Canada.com. April 5, 2008. "Trudeaumania, a term coined by a journalist named Lubor J. Zink during the 1968 federal election campaign to describe Canada's feverish zeal for the Liberal party leader"
- Gwyn, Richard (1980). The Northern Magus: Pierre Trudeau and Canadians. Toronto: McClelland and Stewart. ISBN 978-0-7710-3732-0.
- Hilliker, John; Halloran, Mary; Donaghy, Greg (2017). Canada's Department of External Affairs, Volume 3: Innovation and Adaptation, 1968–1984. Toronto: University of Toronto Press. ISBN 978-1-4875-1496-9.
- Janigan, Mary (November 1, 1975). "Some MPs say they regret voting for War Measures". The Toronto Star. Toronto. p. 3.
- Janigan, Mary; Chidley, Joe; Wilson-Smith, Anthony; Lewis, Robert; Stevens, Geoffrey; Newman, Peter C.; O'Hara, Jane (August 1, 2014) [First published April 6, 1998]. "Trudeau, 30 Years Later". Maclean's – via The Canadian Encyclopedia.
- Laxer, James; Laxer, Robert (1977). The Liberal idea of Canada: Pierre Trudeau and the question of Canada's survival. Toronto: J. Lorimer. ISBN 978-0-88862-124-5.
- Lyon, David; Van Die, Marguerite (2000). Rethinking church, state, and modernity: Canada between Europe and America. Toronto: University of Toronto Press. ISBN 978-0-8020-4408-2.
- Moscovitch, Allan (August 13, 2015). "Welfare State". The Canadian Encyclopedia (online ed.). Historica Canada.
- Munroe, Susan (2012). "October Crisis Timeline: Key Events in the October Crisis in Canada". Canadaonline / About.com. New York: The New York Times. Archived from the original on August 19, 2012.
- Phythian, Mark (2000). The Politics of British Arms Sales Since 1964: 'To Secure Our Rightful Share'. Manchester, United Kingdom: Manchester University Press. ISBN 978-0-7190-5907-0.
- "PM Trudeau won't let 'em rain on his parade". CBC News. Toronto: CBC Digital Archives. June 24, 1968. Archived from the original on March 22, 2013.
- Trudeau, Pierre Elliot (1993). Memoirs. Toronto: McClelland & Stewart. ISBN 978-0-7710-8588-8.
- Zink, Lubor (1972). Trudeaucracy. Toronto: Toronto Sun Publishing. p. 152. "Lubor Zink is the one who first coined those two terms of our times – Trudeaumania and Trudeaucracy. When Canada, led by its media, was dazzled by the Trudeau "charisma" and style, Zink saw behind the glitter and sought to define the man ..."

Canadian federal premierships
Preceded by Lester B. Pearson	Pierre Trudeau; 1968–1979	Succeeded by Joe Clark
Preceded by Joe Clark	Pierre Trudeau; 1980–1984	Succeeded by John Turner
