= National Energy Program =

Energy policy of the Government of Canada from 1980 to 1985

The National Energy Program (French: Programme énergétique national, NEP) was an energy policy of the Canadian federal government from 1980 to 1985. The economically nationalist policy sought to secure Canadian energy independence, though was strongly opposed by the private sector and the oil-producing Western Canadian provinces, most notably Alberta.

Created under the Liberal government of Prime Minister Pierre Trudeau on October 28, 1980, following the two oil crises of the 1970s, the NEP had three main objectives: increase ownership of the oil industry by Canadians; price energy fairly for Canadian consumers; and provide Canadian energy self-sufficiency. The NEP was also designed to promote lower prices through price controls; promote exploration for oil in Canada; promote alternative energy sources; and increase federal government revenues from oil sales through a variety of taxes and revenue-sharing with the oil-producing Western Canadian provinces.

The NEP proved to be a highly controversial policy initiative and sparked intense opposition and anger in Western Canada, particularly in Alberta. The province's premier, Peter Lougheed, was a vocal opponent of the NEP on the grounds that it interfered with provincial jurisdiction and unfairly deprived Alberta of oil revenue. In 1981, Lougheed and Trudeau reached a revenue-sharing agreement. Opponents say that due to the NEP, the unemployment rate in Alberta rose from 3.7 percent to 12.4 percent, the bankruptcy rate in Alberta rose by 150 percent, and Alberta's losses were estimated to be between $50 billion and $100 billion (though Alberta's unemployment rate, bankruptcy rate, and revenue losses were also affected by the early 1980s recession and a crash in oil prices).

The term "Western alienation" was coined as a result of the NEP. The policy was repealed by the newly-elected Progressive Conservative (PC) government of Prime Minister Brian Mulroney on June 1, 1985. The NEP contributed to the creation and rise of the Western Canadian-based and right-wing populist Reform Party which made a major breakthrough in the 1993 federal election; the Reform Party merged with the PCs in 2003, becoming the Conservative Party which governed Canada under Prime Minister Stephen Harper from 2006 to 2015.

== Background ==
In his preamble to the announcement of the National Energy Program, introduced as part of the October 1980 federal budget, Finance Minister Allan MacEachen echoed concerns by leaders of developed countries regarding the recession that followed both oil crises of the 1970s and the "deeply troubling air of uncertainty and anxiety" that was shared by Canadians. The Bank of Canada reported that economic problems had been accelerated and magnified. Inflation was most commonly between 9% and 10% annually, and prime interest rates were over 10%.

...ever since the oil crisis of 1973 industrial countries have had to struggle with the problems of inflation and stubbornly high rates of unemployment. In 1979 the world was shaken by a second major oil shock. For the industrial world this has meant a sharp renewal of inflationary forces and real income losses. For the developing world this second oil shock has been a major tragedy. Their international deficits are now three to four times the sum they receive in aid from the rest of the world.... They are not just Canadian problems. ...they are world-wide problems. At the Venice Summit and at meetings of Finance Ministers of the IMF and OECD, we have seen these new themes emerge.

=== Global context ===
Historically, the United States had been by far the world's largest oil producer, and the world oil market had been dominated by a small number of giant multinational (mostly-American) oil companies (the so-called "Seven Sisters of oil": Standard Oil of New Jersey, alias Exxon (US); Standard Oil of New York, alias Mobil (US/UK); Standard Oil of California, alias Chevron (US), Gulf Oil, now part of Chevron (US); Texaco, now part of Chevron (US); Anglo-Persian Oil Company, alias BP (UK); and Royal Dutch Shell, alias Shell (UK/Netherlands). During the late 1940s, the 1950s, the 1960s, and the early 1970s, the discovery and development of many giant oil and gas fields outside the US by those and other companies kept the world flooded with cheap oil. Meanwhile, global demand increased to take advantage of the increased global supply at lower prices. In particular, US oil consumption increased faster than production, and the country, which had been a net oil exporter, became a major oil importer.

In 1970, US oil production unexpectedly peaked and started to decline, which caused global oil markets to tighten rapidly as the US started to import more and more Arab oil. As the decade continued, global demand caught up with global supply, and two major oil price shocks occurred: the 1973 oil crisis and the 1979 oil crisis. The first occurred after the Organization of Arab Petroleum Exporting Countries (OAPEC), whose membership is the Arab members of the similarly named Organization of Petroleum Exporting Countries (OPEC), plus Egypt, Syria, and Tunisia, imposed an embargo on oil exports to the US, the UK, the Netherlands, Japan, and Canada in retaliation for supporting Israel during the Yom Kippur War. US producers had been able to defeat the 1967 oil embargo by ramping up domestic production and flooding the world market with additional product at cut-rate prices, but declining domestic production and the ongoing rise in global demand prevented a similar response to the 1973 Arab embargo. The result was immediate shortages and lineups for gasoline in importing countries, particularly the US, which signalled the end of decades of cheap oil and a change in the balance of power from consuming countries, which now included the United States, to producing countries. On October 16, 1973, the Ministerial Committee of the Persian Gulf's OPEC membership announced an immediate rise in its posted price from $2.18 to $5.12 per barrel of oil. "Thus for the first time in oil history, the producing countries assumed power to consider and set the oil price unilaterally, and independently of the" Seven Sisters.

The Yom Kippur War ended in October, but the price of oil continued to increase, and by January 1974, it had quadrupled to US$12 a barrel. "The more than seven-fold increase in the oil price from $1.80/b in 1970 to $13.54/b in 1978 created profound and far-reaching changes in the world oil balance, as well as the prevailing relationships among major oil producers, principal oil importers, and the major oil companies... [and the] spectacular jump of the crude spot price to more than $US40/b following the 1979 Iranian Revolution, turned the global oil market into total disarray." The Norwegian economics historian Ola Honningdal Grytten described that period in the 1970s as one of a prolonged global recession and slow growth that affected most developed economies.

The 1979 oil crisis, precipitated by the Iranian Revolution and compounded by the Iran–Iraq War, was the second major market disturbance in the 1970s. "The curtailment of oil supplies and the skyrocketing of oil prices had far-reaching effects on producers, consumers, and the oil industry itself."

In his State of the Union Address in January 1980, US President Jimmy Carter described how his country's "excessive dependence on foreign oil is a clear and present danger," and he called for a "clear, comprehensive energy policy for the United States."

=== Canadian context ===
The Canadian petroleum industry arose in parallel with that of the US. The first oil well in North America was dug in Ontario in 1848 by using picks and shovels, one year before the first oil well in the United States had been drilled in Pennsylvania. By 1870, Canada had 100 oil refineries in operation and was exporting oil to Europe. However, the oil fields of Ontario were shallow and small, and oil production started to decline around 1900 while the automobile started to become popular. In contrast, US oil production grew rapidly after huge discoveries had been made in Texas, Oklahoma, California, and elsewhere. By the end of World War II, Canada imported 90% of its oil, mostly from the US.

The situation changed dramatically in 1947, when Imperial Oil drilled a well near Leduc, Alberta, to see what was causing peculiar anomalies on its newly introduced reflection seismology surveys. The peculiar anomalies turned out to be oil fields, and Leduc No. 1 was the discovery well for the first of many large oil fields. As a consequence of the large finds, cheap and plentiful Alberta oil produced a huge surplus of oil on the Canadian Prairies, which had no immediate market since the major oil markets were in Ontario and Quebec. In 1949, Imperial Oil applied to the federal government to build the Interprovincial Pipeline (IPL) to Lake Superior, which allowed it to supply the Midwestern United States. By 1956, the pipeline had been extended via Sarnia, Ontario, to Toronto; at 3,100 kilometres (1,900 mi), it became the longest oil pipeline in the world. The federal government gave approval to build a pipeline in Western Canada, and in 1953, the 1,200 kilometres (750 mi) Transmountain Pipeline was built from Edmonton to Vancouver, British Columbia, with an extension to northwest Washington. The pipelines did more to improve the energy security of the United States than that of Canada since the Canadian government was more interested in Canada's trade balance than in military or energy security. The Canadian government assumed that Eastern Canada could always import enough oil to meet its needs and that imported oil would always be cheaper than domestic oil.

==== National Energy Board ====
The National Energy Board (NEB) was created in 1959 "to monitor and report on all federal matters of energy as well as regulate pipelines, energy imports and exports and utility rates and tariffs." The NEB regulated mostly the construction and the operation of oil and natural gas pipelines crossing provincial or international borders. The Board approved pipeline traffic, tolls, and tariffs under the authority of the National Energy Board Act.

From its introduction in 1961 to its end in September 1973, the National Oil Policy (NOP) was the cornerstone of Canadian energy policy. It "established a protected market for domestic oil west of the Ottawa Valley, which freed the industry from foreign competition," and the five eastern provinces, which included major refineries in New Brunswick and Quebec, continued to rely on foreign imports of crude oil, such as from Venezuela. In 1973, "the federal government announced the extension of the inter-provincial oil pipeline to Montreal (completed in 1976), froze prices of domestic crude and certain oil products, and sought to control export prices. The federal government announced this change in policy so that supply problems in the United States would not automatically raise prices for Canadian consumers."

After the first OPEC price shock in 1973, the federal government "formally broke the link between domestic prices and international prices. The objective of 'made-in-Canada' prices for crude oil was to protect Canadians across the country from the whims of the world oil market and to provide producers with enough incentives to develop new energy resources."

In 1981, the Edmonton economist Brian Scarfe claimed that the NEB's setting of the price of oil and natural gas in Canada meant that producers did not receive full world prices for the resource and that consumers were not charged world prices. He claimed that the subsidies had a number of side effects, including larger trade deficits, larger federal budget deficits, higher real interest rates, and higher inflation.

==== Petro-Canada ====
Petro-Canada logo

In 1975, in response to the world energy crisis, the federal government created Petro-Canada, a Canadian crown corporation and national oil company. Petro-Canada was involved in the massive Hibernia oil find off Newfoundland and was a partner in the Syncrude oil sands venture in Fort McMurray, Alberta. The Alberta oil industry was then overwhelmingly owned by Americans, who were also the major importer of Albertan oil. The Petro-Canada Centre (1975–2009) was known in the oil patch as "Red Square" until its purchase by Suncor. The NEP included plans for a "greatly-expanded Petro-Canada."

==== Price controls ====
In 1974, Canada inaugurated its first system for pricing oil with three objectives: to regulate prices of domestic crude oil by federal-provincial agreements, to subsidize imported oil so that consumers in Eastern Canada would enjoy lower prices, and to control prices and quantities of crude oil and products in the exporting market. Synthetic crude oil (upgraded petroleum from oil sands) was exempted from the policy and was sold at the world price. The federal government levied a tax on all oil refined in Canada to pay for the difference between the price of synthetic and that of conventional crude oil.

The federal budget in October 1980 reflected the concern that Canada could "become increasingly dependent on insecure foreign supplies and, therefore, unnecessarily subject to the vagaries of the world oil market."

On 28 October 1980, Finance Minister Allan MacEachen introduced the National Energy Program but cautioned that things could get worse if there were "new shocks coming from the price of oil or food or if the upward momentum of costs and prices proves impervious to the economic climate I am seeking to create."

"The new energy policy limits the rise in prices of oil and gas to domestic consumers and thus continues to protect us from the violent shocks of OPEC price increases. It strengthens our specific measures to promote the most economical use of energy and in particular the displacement of oil by other fuels. It provides new impetus to the development of new sources of supply, through direct government programs and through new incentives of particular value to Canadian-owned producers. Energy policy is only the most urgent element of our new strategy. Renewed growth in productivity and lower costs are needed throughout the economy. Within the overall expenditure plan which I will lay before the House, we have assigned clear priority to economic development."

— MacEachen October 1980

== Goals ==
The NEP's goals were "security of supply and ultimate independence from the world oil market; opportunity for all Canadians to participate in the energy industry; particularly oil and gas, and to share in the benefits of its expansion; and fairness, with a pricing and revenue-sharing regime which recognizes the needs and rights of all Canadians."

The NEP had three main objectives: increase ownership of the oil industry by Canadians; price energy fairly for Canadian consumers; and provide Canadian energy self-sufficiency. The NEP was also designed to promote lower prices with price controls; promote exploration for oil in Canada; promote alternative energy sources; and increase federal government revenues from oil sales through a variety of taxes and revenue-sharing agreements.

The NEP's Petroleum Gas Revenue Tax (PGRT) instituted a double-taxation mechanism that did not apply to other commodities, such as gold and copper (see "Program details" item (c), below), "to redistribute revenue from the [oil] industry and lessen the cost of oil for Eastern Canada" in an attempt to insulate the Canadian economy from the shock of rising global oil prices (see "Program details" item (a), below). In 1981, Scarfe argued that by keeping domestic oil prices below world market prices, the NEP was essentially mandating provincial generosity and subsidizing all Canadian consumers of fuel, because of Alberta and the other oil-producing provinces (such as Newfoundland, which received funding by the NEP for the Hibernia project).

However, Marc Lalonde, the Minister of Energy Mines and Resources whose department oversaw development of the NEP would later say in 1986: "The major factor behind the NEP wasn't Canadianization or getting more from the industry or even self sufficiency," [...] "The determinant factor was the fiscal imbalance between the provinces and the federal government [...] "Our proposal was to increase Ottawa's share appreciably, so that the share of the producing provinces would decline significantly and the industry's share would decline somewhat."

=== Details ===
The NEP "had three principles: (1) security of supply and ultimate independence from the world market, (2) opportunity for all Canadians to participate in the energy industry, particularly oil and gas, and to share in the benefits of its expansion, and (3) fairness, with a pricing and revenue-sharing regime which recognizes the needs and rights of all Canadians."

"The main elements of the program included:

1. a blended or 'made-in-Canada' price of oil, an average of the costs of imported and domestic oil, which will rise gradually and predictably but will remain well below world prices and will never be more than 85 per cent of the lower of the price of imported oil or of oil in the US, and which will be financed by a Petroleum Compensation Charge levied on refiners...;
2. natural gas prices which will increase less quickly than oil prices, but which will include a new and rising federal tax on all natural gas and gas liquids;
3. a petroleum and gas revenue tax of 8 per cent applied to net operating revenues before royalty and other expense deductions on all production of oil and natural gas in Canada...;
4. the phasing out of the depletion allowances for oil and gas exploration and development, which will be replaced with a new system of direct incentive payments, structured to encourage investment by Canadian companies, with added incentives for exploration on Canada Lands (lands which the federal government held the mineral rights as opposed to private lands and lands which provinces held the mineral rights);
5. a federal share of petroleum production income at the wellhead which will rise from about 10 per cent in recent years to 24 per cent over the 1980–83 period, with the share of the producing provinces falling from 45 to 43 per cent and that of the industry falling from 45 to 33 per cent over the same period;
6. added incentives for energy conservation and energy conversion away from oil, particularly applicable to Eastern Canada, including the extension of the natural gas pipe-line system to Quebec City and the maritimes, with the additional transport charges being passed back to the producer; and
7. a Canadian ownership levy to assist in financing the acquisition of the Canadian operations of one or more multinational oil companies, with the objective of achieving at least 50 per cent Canadian ownership of oil and gas production by 1990, Canadian control of a significant number of the major oil and gas corporations, and an early increase in the share of the oil and gas sector owned by the Government of Canada."

== Impact on Alberta ==
=== Revenues ===
While the program increased domestic price controls, the emphasis on revenue sharing and incentives for oil exploration on federally owned lands was viewed critically by Alberta Premier Peter Lougheed. Lougheed fought the program vigorously in the courts and in public, where he actively stoked Alberta nationalism in a television address, stating the program would bring more "Ottawa" to the province. Prior to the announcement of the National Energy Program, Lougheed had threatened to reduce Alberta's production of oil and gas to counter any federal program to increase taxes. If Alberta reduced production, Central Canada refineries and other businesses would need to purchase foreign oil which would be heavily subsidized by the federal government, a cost that it could not afford to with a $13.7 billion deficit in 1980.

Lougheed finally decided to exercise this authority to force Trudeau to concede some measures of the Program, and Lougheed announced on television a 60,000 barrel reduction to Alberta's production of crude oil to take place over nine months beginning in April 1981, and the suspension of two oil sands projects. Lougheed however pledged that he would not allow a national oil shortage to occur, and would suspend the cuts if a shortage occurred. The threat was successful as Trudeau and Lougheed signed "an oil and gas prices and revenue sharing" agreement in 1981:

"The agreement sets a series of price increases for old oil starting with a $2.50 a barrel increase on October 1, 1981 and "generous" near world prices for new oil, effective January 1, 1982, which will see an estimated wellhead price of $49.22 per barrel by July 1, 1982. New oil is defined as oil from pools initially discovered after December 31, 1980. It includes new conventional oil found in Alberta, synthetic oil, including existing production from the SUNCOR and SYNCRUDE plants, and new oil from Canada lands.... At their press conference Tuesday, the leaders of both parties estimated the deal is worth an approximate $212.8 billion in revenues to Ottawa, Alberta and the petroleum industry over the next five years. An estimate of the revenue share compared to the NEP proposal indicated the federal government will receive $14 billion more than in the NEP schedule, the industry will receive $10 billion more and Alberta will receive $8 billion more. According to Lalonde, in percentage terms compared to the NEP, Ottawa's share will rise from 24% to 29%, Alberta's share will rise to 34% from 33%, and industry's share will drop from 43% to 33% over the life of the agreement. Lougheed said because of the pact industry will receive about 25% more cash flow due to the two-tier new and old pricing scheme, which represents an improvement in cash flow of at least $2 billion for each year of the agreement."

— Nickle's Energy Group 1981

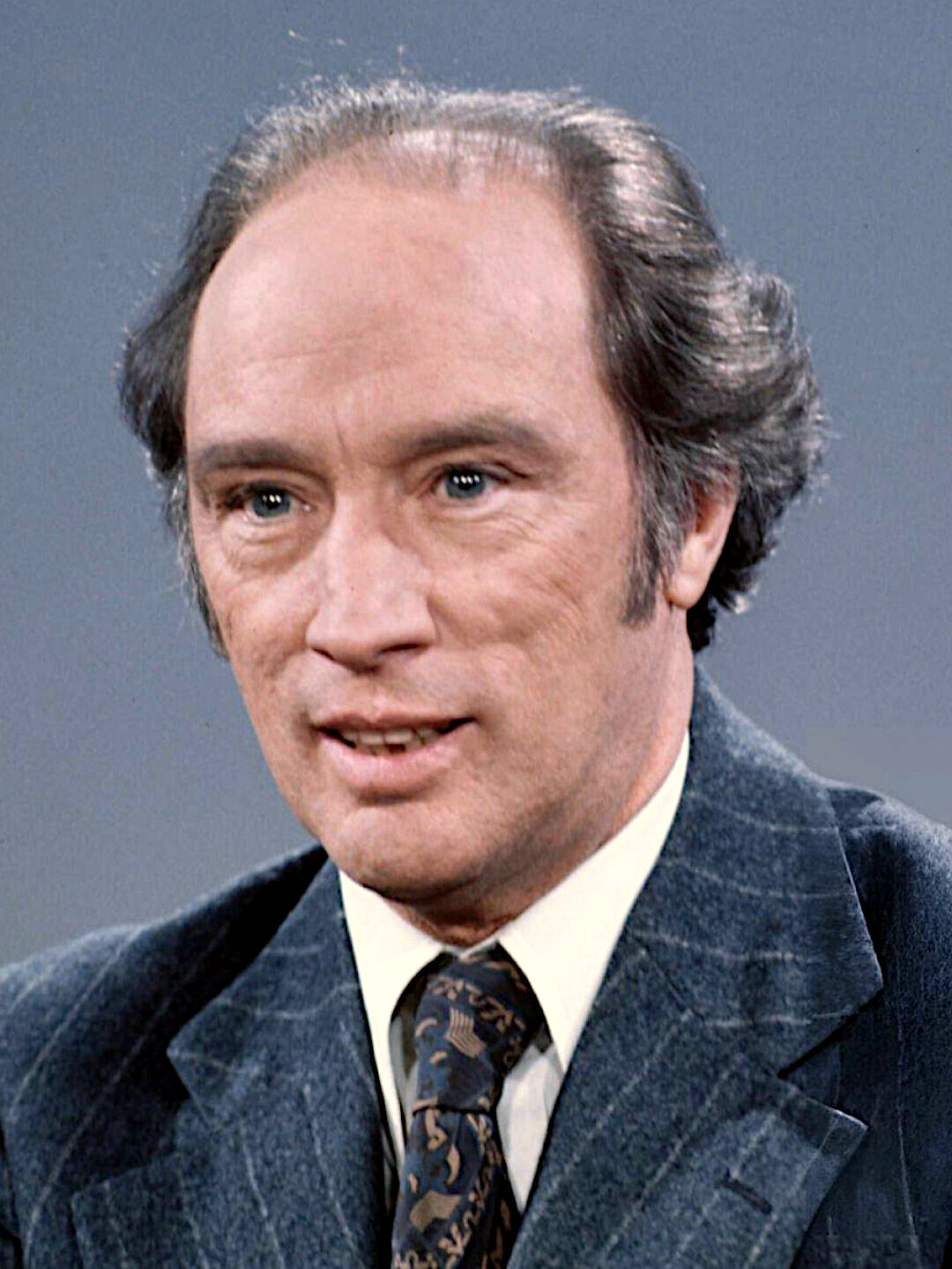
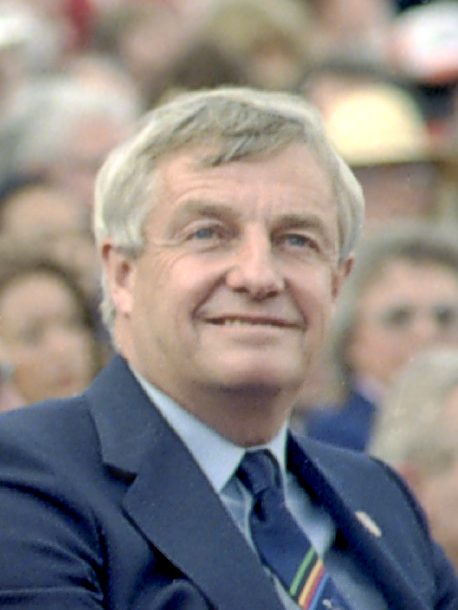
Alberta Premier Peter Lougheed (right) was a vocal opponent of the NEP introduced by the federal government of Prime Minister Pierre Trudeau (left)

Lougheed's success in the agreement was marked by a widely published photograph of a celebratory champagne toast with Trudeau and himself. Lougheed later admitted to regretting the toast.

Lougheed's battle with the National Energy Program corresponded with the 1980s oil glut where energy prices dropped dramatically due to falling demand. Lougheed was forced to lower royalty rates through the Oil and Gas Activity Program and focused the government's efforts on natural gas diversification to stem falling revenues and a declining economy.

Helliwell et al. (1983) reported that the early 1980s energy price declines prompted the federal and provincial governments to update their revenue-sharing agreements. The amended agreements allowed for $4.2 billion in higher revenues ($1.7 billion for the federal government and $1.2 billion each for the provincial governments and industry), which was 30% of the increase that would have been gained from going to world prices. According to Helliwell et al., the NEP did not in fact cause industry to be significantly exposed to the declining global oil prices, but the largest part of direct revenue losses accrued to governments. Thus, industry operated throughout the period of the NEP under relatively-similar oil prices, the "made-in-Canada" oil price (see item (a) in National Energy Program Details, above).

In 1981, the Edmonton economist Scarfe argued that the greatest impact of the NEP was its failure to deliver the revenues that had been originally forecast in the 1980 federal budget. Introduced by Finance Minister Allan MacEachen, it projected a reduction of federal deficits from $14.2 billion in 1980 to $11.8 billion in fiscal 1984, primarily from substantial increases in revenues from the oil and gas sector, and the maintenance of expenditures. Scarfe speculated that the NEP would discourage large-scale oil investment projects and thus reduce these projected revenues. Federal deficits had been expected to decrease, primarily by substantial increases in revenues from oil and gas. Instead, by 1983, the Ministry of Finance had concluded that the federal government had established a structural deficit of $29.7 billion, an increase from 3.5% of GNP in 1980 to 6.2% of GNP in 1983.

Estimates have placed Alberta's losses between $50 billion and $100 billion because of the NEP. Alberta still initially enjoyed an economic surplus due to high oil prices, but the surplus was heavily reduced by the NEP, which, in turn, stymied many of Lougheed's policies for economic diversification to reduce Alberta's dependence on the cyclical energy industry, such as the Alberta Heritage Savings Trust Fund, and also left the province with an infrastructure deficit. In particular, the Alberta Heritage Fund was meant to save as much of the earnings during high oil prices to act as a "rainy day" cushion if oil prices collapsed because of the cyclical nature of the oil and gas industry. The NEP was one reason that the fund failed to grow to its full potential. In 2022, the Heritage Savings Trust Fund has $19B, a moderate increase on the $13B it had in 1986. This slow growth occurred despite some years when Alberta government had multi-billion-dollar surpluses.

=== GDP ===
Alberta's GDP was between $60 billion and $80 billion annually during the years of the NEP (1980-1986). It is unclear whether the estimates took into account the decline in world crude oil prices that began only a few months after the NEP had come into force, the graph of long-term oil prices shows that prices adjusted for inflation did not drop below pre-1980s levels until 1985. Since the program was cancelled in 1986, the NEP was active for five years with among the most expensive for oil prices on record, and the NEP prevented Alberta's economy from fully realising those prices.

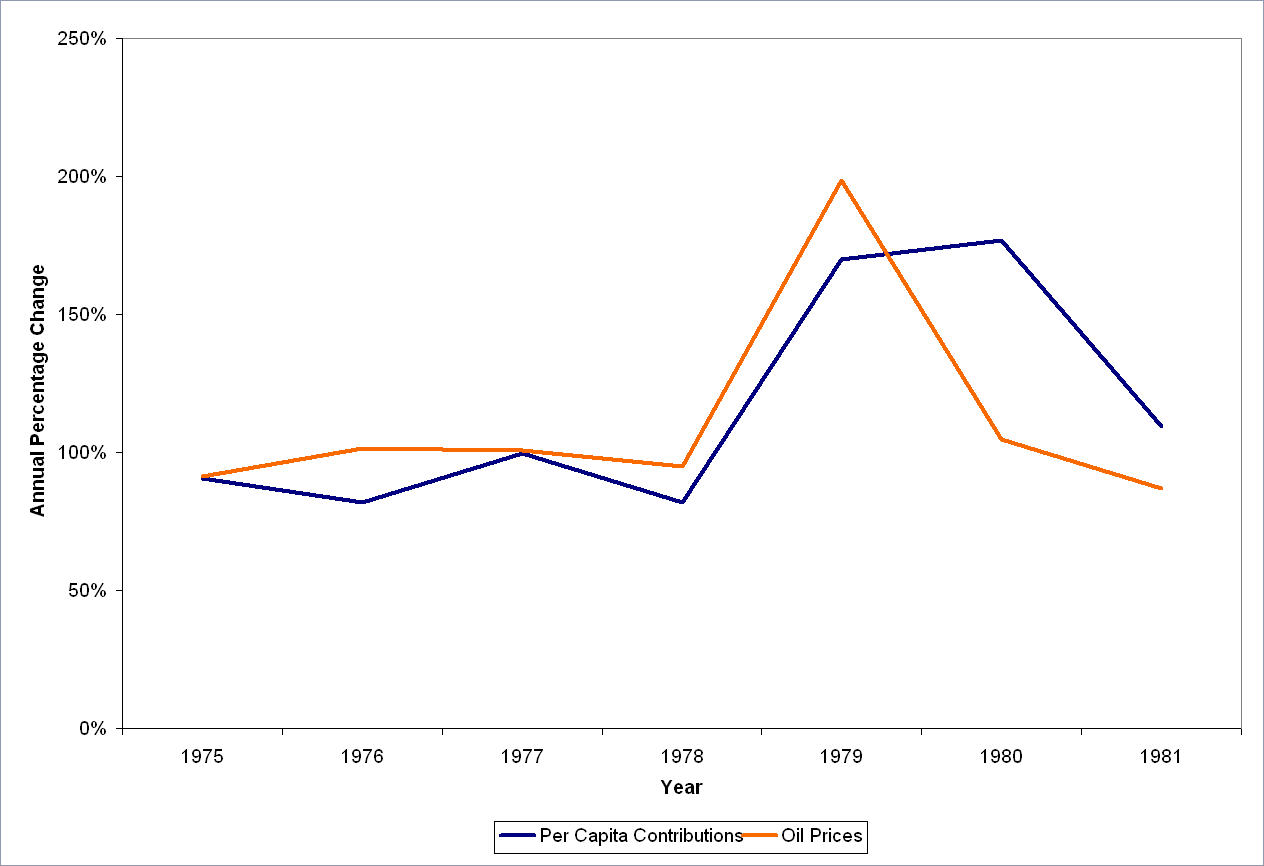
Fluctuations: Oil Prices & Alberta Per Capita Federal Contributions 1975-1981

==== Provincial per capita federal contributions ====
In inflation-adjusted 2004 dollars, the year the NEP took effect (1980) per capita had fiscal contributions by Alberta to the federal government increase 77% over 1979 levels from $6,578 in 1979 to $11,641 in 1980. In the five years prior to the NEP (1975–1979), the per capita contributions by Alberta had approximated the fluctuations in the price of oil (see graph Fluctuations: Oil Prices & Alberta Per Capita Federal Contributions 1975–1981). In 1980, however, the inflation-adjusted average price of oil was only 5% higher than the previous year, but the per capita contributions from Alberta rose 77% (see graph Fluctuations: Oil Prices & Alberta Per Capita Federal Contributions 1975–1981). Again in inflation-adjusted 2004 dollars, the year the NEP was terminated (1986) had per capita contributions to the federal government by Alberta collapse to $680, a mere 10% of 1979 levels.

During the NEP years (1980–1985), only one other province was a net contributor per capita to the federal government: Saskatchewan, which also produces oil. In 1980 and 1981, Saskatchewan was a net per capita contributor to the federal government with a peak in 1981 at only $514, compared to Alberta's peak of $12,735 the same year, both values being 2004 inflation-adjusted dollars. Thus, during the NEP (1980 to 1985), Alberta was the sole overall net contributor to the federal government, and all other provinces enjoyed being net recipients.

=== Bankruptcies and unemployment ===
In 1982, during the severe global recession, there were over 30,000 consumer bankruptcies in Canada, a 33% increase over the previous year. The bankruptcy rate began to fall from 1983 to 1985, as the economy strengthened. From 1980 to 1985, bankruptcies per 1,000 businesses in Canada peaked at 50% above the 1980 rate. Meanwhile, the bankruptcy rate in Alberta rose by 150% after the NEP took effect.

Since bankruptcies and real estate prices did not fare as negatively in Central Canada as in the rest of Canada and in the United States, the NEP might have had a positive effect in Central Canada.

The unemployment rate in Alberta rose from 3.7 percent in September 1980 to 12.4 percent in 1984 following passage of the NEP.

== Price of oil ==
Long-term oil prices, 1861-2007 (top line adjusted for inflation).

Throughout the 1950s, the 1960s, and the 1970s, the retail price of petroleum in Canada consistently remained close to the price of gasoline in the United States and was often lower than prices seen in the US, especially during the 1970s price spikes. The NEP, which raised the price of fuel in the West and coincided with a hike in provincial gas taxes in Ontario and Quebec, made the retail price of gasoline in Canada become noticeably higher than that of the US, a trend that has continued ever since.

== Abolition ==
The rationale for the program weakened when world oil prices began a slow decline in the early 1980s and collapsed in late 1985. A phased shutdown was commenced by Jean Chrétien, then Minister of Energy, Mines and Resources.

In the 1984 election, the Progressive Conservative Party of Brian Mulroney was elected to a majority in the House of Commons with the support of Western Canada after he had campaigned against the NEP. However, Mulroney did not eliminate the last vestiges of the program until two-and-a half years later, when world oil prices had dropped below pre-1980s levels (as adjusted for inflation: see Long-Term Oil Prices, 1861–2007).

On June 1, 1985, after extensive discussions between the federal Government and the governments of the oil-producing provinces, the "Western Accord on Energy" was agreed. It provided for the full deregulation of oil prices and for allowing the market forces of international and local supply and demand determine prices. Included in the full deregulation of domestic oil prices, the Western Accord also "abolished import subsidies, the export tax on crude and oil products, and the petroleum compensation charge. It also phased out PIP grants and the PGRT. In addition, controls were lifted on oil exports."

== Legacy and Western alienation ==
The NEP was extremely unpopular in Western Canada, especially in Alberta, where most of Canada's oil is produced. With natural resources falling constitutionally within the domain of provincial jurisdictions, many Albertans viewed the NEP as a detrimental intrusion by the federal government into the province's affairs. Edmonton economist Scarfe argued that for people in Western Canada, especially Alberta, the NEP was perceived to be at their expense in benefiting the eastern provinces. Particularly vilified was Prime Minister Pierre Trudeau, whose Liberals had no seat west of Manitoba. Ed Clark, a senior bureaucrat in the Trudeau Liberal government, helped to develop the National Energy Program and earned himself the moniker "Red Ed" in the Alberta oil industry. Shortly after Brian Mulroney had taken office, Clark was fired.

Petro-Canada, established in 1975, was responsible for implementing much of the Program. Petro-Canada was given the backronym "Pierre Elliott Trudeau Rips Off Canada" by opponents of the National Energy Program.

According to Mary Elizabeth Vicente, an Edmonton librarian who wrote an article on the National Energy Program in 2005, the popular western slogan during the NEP, appearing on many bumper stickers, was "Let the Eastern bastards freeze in the dark." Other bumpers stated "I'd rather push this thing a mile than buy gas from PetroCan."

McKenzie argued in 1981 that politically, the NEP heightened distrust of the federal government in Western Canada, especially in Alberta, where many believed the NEP to be an intrusion of the federal government into an area of provincial jurisdiction.

According to a National Post journalist,

"The anger and alienation of this era would provide much of the fuel behind the rise of Reform and Canadian Alliance parties, becoming the Conservative Party that rules Ottawa today. The anger and alienation of Albertans also led Mr. Lougheed to oppose many of Mr. Trudeau’s proposed plans for the Constitution Act of 1982; he argued against granting Ontario and Quebec veto powers, fought for provincial resource rights and insisted on the notwithstanding clause.

— Jen Gerson 2012

== See also ==
- Energy policy of Canada
