= Global Sales Law Project =

Research project based at the University of Basel

The Global Sales Law Project is a research project based at the University of Basel under the leadership of Ingeborg Schwenzer. It compares the sales and contract laws of more than 60 jurisdictions.

== Global Sales and Contract Law ==
The centerpiece of the project is the Global Sales and Contract Law handbook, authored by Ingeborg Schwenzer together with Christopher Kee and Pascal Hachem. The work provides a comprehensive systematic analysis based on the functional comparative method. Particularly remarkable about the book is the approach of research in so far as the comparison is completely based on the functional comparative method rather than on the basis of separate country reports. The authors based their work on the doctoral theses of Mohamed Hafez (Arabia and the Middle East), Natia Lapiashvili (Eastern Europe and Central Asia), Edgardo Muñoz (Latin America), Jean Alain Penda Matipe (Central and Southern Africa), and Sophia Juan Yang (Southeast Asia). Each of these theses was a comparative legal work on one family of legal systems and all of them were supervised by Schwenzer.

== Commentary on the CISG ==
Also part of the Global Sales Law Project is the leading commentary on the United Nations Convention on Contracts for the International Sale of Goods (CISG), edited by Ingeborg Schwenzer. The commentary is published in German (5th edition), English (3rd edition), and Spanish (1st edition). It is currently being translated to Mandarin Chinese.

== CISG-online ==
CISG-online is the only comprehensive database in the German-speaking world on CISG case law and as such also part of the project.
