= Peter Schlechtriem =

Peter Schlechtriem (March 2, 1933, in Jena – April 23, 2007, in Freiburg im Breisgau) was a German jurisprudential scholar.

== Biography ==
Peter H. Schlechtriem was born March 2, 1933, in Jena (Germany) and studied law at the University of Hamburg and the Albert-Ludwigs-University of Freiburg. After having passed both his State Examinations in law, he in 1964 received the title of Doctor iuris from the Albert-Ludwigs-University of Freiburg for his dissertation on foreign inheritance law. In 1965 the University of Chicago Law School awarded him a Master of Comparative Law. Peter Schlechtriem subsequently returned to Freiburg where in 1970 he completed his Habilitation with a substantial book on the relationship between liability in contracts and tort, written under the supervision of Ernst von Caemmerer.

In 1971 he was offered professorships at both the University of Erlangen and the University of Heidelberg. He accepted the chair in Heidelberg, where he headed the Institute for Foreign and International Private Law. In 1977, he accepted a professorship in Freiburg and became the successor of his academic teacher Ernst von Caemmerer. When being offered a chair by the University of Vienna (Austria) in 1984, he declined.

== Work ==
Peter Schlechtriem's academic work focused on the law of contracts, comparative law and international uniform law. His two textbooks on the German law of contracts, contributions to commentaries and numerous articles have significantly influenced the development of the law in Germany and abroad. His article-by-article commentary on the 1980 Vienna Sales Convention (CISG), published both the German and in English, has been particularly successful. Peter Schlechtriem's writings have been translated into several languages.

Peter Schlechtriem served on numerous international commissions. He was a member of the German delegation at the Diplomatic Conference in Vienna that adopted the United Nations Convention on Contracts for the International Sale of Goods in 1980. During the creation of the new Civil Codes of Estonia, Lithuania, Russia and Slovakia, he acted as a consultant and advisor. Peter Schlechtriem was a member if the Commission for the Reform of the German Law of contracts (Kommission zur Reform des deutschen Schuldrechts) and thus exercised considerable influence on the new general law of contracts and law of sales in force in Germany since 2002. He acted as a member of the German Council on International Private Law, of the UNIDROIT Working Group on the development of the UNIDROIT Principles of International Commercial Contracts 2004, of the Study Group for a European Civil Code and was an Advisor of both the American Law Institute and the National Conference of Commissioners of Uniform State Laws in the United States. From 1990 until 1997, Peter Schlechtriem was President of the German Gesellschaft für Rechtsvergleichung. He served as the first Chairman of the CISG Advisory Council (from 2001 until 2004).

== Honours and international recognition ==
Peter Schlechtriem served as a visiting professor at the University of Chicago Law School, Harvard Law School, Victoria University of Wellington, the University of Fribourg (Switzerland), the University of Zurich and Oxford University. In 1995 he received a Doctorate honoris causa from the University of Basle, and in 2002 a Doctorate honoris causa from the University of Tartu (Estonia). He became a Fellow of St. Catherine's College in Oxford in 2001. Peter Schlechtriem was a member of the International Academy of Comparative Law. On occasion of his 70th birthday in 2003, he was presented with a substantial Festschrift.

== Selected publications ==
- Schlechtriem, Vertragsordnung und außervertragliche Haftung, Frankfurt am Main (1972)
- Schlechtriem & Schwenzer, Kommentar zum Einheitlichen UN-Kaufrecht - CISG -, 4th ed., Munich: C.H. Beck (2004), ISBN 978-3-406-51565-1
- Schlechtriem, Commentary on the UN Convention on the International Sale of Goods, 2nd ed., Oxford: Oxford University Press (2005), ISBN 978-3-406-53144-6
- Schlechtriem, Internationales UN-Kaufrecht, 4th ed., Tübingen: Mohr (2007), ISBN 978-3-16-149277-8
