= 391 Ingeborg =

Mars-crossing asteroid

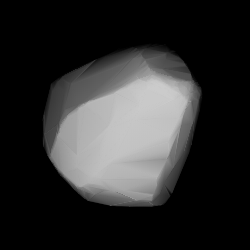
- Modelled shape of Ingeborg from its lightcurve

Discovery
- Discovered by: M. F. Wolf
- Discovery site: Heidelberg Obs.
- Discovery date: 1 November 1894

Designations
- Pronunciation: German: [ˈɪŋəbɔʁk]
- Named after: unknown (Ingeborg)
- Alternative designations: 1894 BE · 1934 AJ; A894 VB
- Minor planet category: Mars-crosser

Orbital characteristics
- Epoch 4 September 2017 (JD 2458000.5)
- Uncertainty parameter 0
- Observation arc: 122.86 yr (44,875 days)
- Aphelion: 3.0285 AU
- Perihelion: 1.6120 AU
- Semi-major axis: 2.3203 AU
- Eccentricity: 0.3052
- Orbital period (sidereal): 3.53 yr (1,291 days)
- Mean anomaly: 292.16°
- Mean motion: 0° 16^{m} 44.04^{s} / day
- Inclination: 23.202°
- Longitude of ascending node: 212.88°
- Argument of perihelion: 147.06°
- Mars MOID: 0.2350 AU

Physical characteristics
- Dimensions: 15.75±3.05 km 17.33±1.73 km 18.15±0.19 km 19.63 km (calculated)
- Synodic rotation period: 16 h 26.39±0.02 h 26.391±0.006 h 26.4145±0.0005 h 26.4146±0.0005 h 26.4149±0.0001 h
- Geometric albedo: 0.20 (assumed); 0.282±0.056; 0.290±0.110; 0.34±0.16; 0.495±0.013
- Spectral type: Tholen = S SMASS = S
- Absolute magnitude (H): 10.10 · 10.21±0.81 · 10.80 · 10.9 · 10.9±0.2

391 Ingeborg (prov. designation: A894 VB or 1894 BE) is an asteroid and second-largest Mars-crosser on an eccentric orbit from the asteroid belt. It was discovered by German astronomer Max Wolf on 1 November 1894, at the Heidelberg Observatory in southwest Germany. When discovered, it was observed for a couple of weeks, and follow-up observations were made in 1901 and 1904.

Among the many thousands of named minor planets, Ingeborg is one of 120 asteroids, for which no official naming citation has been published. All of these low-numbered asteroids have numbers between 164 Eva and 1514 Ricouxa and were discovered between 1876 and the 1930s, predominantly by astronomers Auguste Charlois, Johann Palisa, Max Wolf and Karl Reinmuth.

Ingeborg orbits the Sun in the inner main-belt at a distance of 1.6–3.0 AU once every 3 years and 6 months (1,291 days). Its orbit has an eccentricity of 0.31 and an inclination of 23° with respect to the ecliptic. The stony S-type asteroid has a rotation period of 26.4 hours

According to the surveys carried out by the Japanese Akari satellite and the NEOWISE mission of NASA's Wide-field Infrared Survey Explorer, Ingeborg measures between 15.75 and 18.15 kilometers in diameter and its surface has an albedo between 0.282 and 0.495. The Collaborative Asteroid Lightcurve Link assumes an albedo of 0.20 and calculates a diameter of 19.63 kilometers based on an absolute magnitude of 10.9. Other large Mars crossing minor planets include 132 Aethra (43 km), 323 Brucia (36 km), and 2204 Lyyli (25 km).
