= 1984 Canadian federal budget =

Marc Lalonde's second national spending plan as Finance Minister

1984 Budget of the Canadian Federal Government
- Presented: 15 February 1984
- Country: Canada
- Parliament: 32nd
- Party: Liberal
- Finance minister: Marc Lalonde
- Total revenue: 71.999 billion
- Total expenditures: 109.166 billion
- Deficit: $37.167 billion

The Canadian federal budget for fiscal year 1984–85 was presented by Minister of Finance Marc Lalonde in the House of Commons of Canada on 15 February 1984.
