= Ingeborg Levin =

German geoscientist

- Born: 6 June 1953; Erlangen, Germany
- Died: 10 February 2024 (aged 70); Heidelberg, Germany
- Education: Heidelberg University
- Occupations: Geoscientist, professor
- Spouse: Dietmar Wagenbach

Ingeborg Levin (6 June 1953 – 10 February 2024) was a German professor in Geosciences at the Institute for Environmental Physics (IUP) of Heidelberg University. Her work with atmospheric measurements significantly contributed to the knowledge of greenhouse gas dynamics. She set up a global network that measures radiocarbon in carbon dioxide (CO_{2}), information that can be used to verify bottom-up estimates of CO_{2} emissions. She uses the concentration data of several chemical species to constrain carbon emissions and help validate global atmospheric models.

== Biography ==
Levin was born in Erlangen, Germany in 1953 and studied physics at Heidelberg University. She completed her diploma thesis in 1978, on regional modeling of the atmospheric CO_{2} based on C-13 and C-14 measurements, followed by her PhD thesis in 1984 on atmospheric CO_{2} sources and sinks across the European Continent.

Levin showed an early interest in finding ways to measure greenhouse gases, especially carbon dioxide, on the regional scale and had several significant accomplishments, according to European Geosciences Union:

The measurements obtained through Levin’s efforts are widely used across the geoscience community to characterise associated carbon fluxes and have proven to be extremely important for our understanding of the global carbon cycle. They have provided key insights in atmospheric and ocean sciences as well as in biogeochemistry and climate science.

In 2020, she was the first woman to receive the Alfred Wegener medal from the European Geosciences Union "for fundamental contributions to our present knowledge and understanding of greenhouse gases in the atmosphere, including the global carbon cycle."

She has been the group leader of the Carbon Cycle group in the Institute for Environmental Physics for more than 20 years, and a lecturer at the Faculty of Physics and Astronomy of Heidelberg University. Since the 1990s, Levin's group has also measured the concentrations of methane and nitrogen oxides, with the aim of also using them to measure human impact.

Levin died on 10 February 2024.

== Selected works ==
Levin is widely published in the scientific literature.

- Levin, Ingeborg, and Bernd Kromer. "The tropospheric 14CO2 level in mid-latitudes of the Northern Hemisphere (1959–2003)." Radiocarbon 46, no. 3 (2004): 1261-1272.
- Levin, Ingeborg, and Vago Hesshaimer. "Radiocarbon–a unique tracer of global carbon cycle dynamics." Radiocarbon 42, no. 1 (2000): 69-80.
- Levin, Ingeborg, Tobias Naegler, Bernd Kromer, Moritz Diehl, Roger Francey, Angel Gomez-Pelaez, Paul Steele, Dietmar Wagenbach, Rolf Weller, and Douglas Worthy. "Observations and modelling of the global distribution and long-term trend of atmospheric 14CO2." Tellus B: Chemical and Physical Meteorology 62, no. 1 (2010): 26-46.
