= 1980 Canadian federal budget =

Canadian federal budget for fiscal year 1980-1981

1980 Budget of the Canadian Federal Government
- Presented: 28 October 1980
- Country: Canada
- Parliament: 32nd
- Party: Liberal
- Finance minister: Allan MacEachen
- Total revenue: 53.181 billion
- Total expenditures: 67.737 billion
- Deficit: $14.556 billion

The Canadian federal budget for fiscal year 1980–81 was presented by Minister of Finance Allan MacEachen in the House of Commons of Canada on 28 October 1980. It was the first budget presented after the Liberals won a majority in the 1980 Canadian federal election.

== Taxes ==
The budget did not bring major changes to either personal income taxes or corporate income taxes, as it mainly focused on the presentation of the National Energy Program. The budget maintained the indexing of income tax tables, costing 1.58 billions in 1981 alone.

The budget however:

- Made the payment of traveling allowances a non-taxable benefit for part-time employees working at least 50 mi (80 km) from their ordinary work location and residence;
- Made Energy Conversion Grants a taxable benefit;
- Extended the Small Business Development Bonds program for three months (until 31 March 1981);
- Re-introduced incentives for the construction of multiple-unit residential buildings (MURB) until the end of 1981;
- Extended the special CCA class for railway tracks at 4% until the end of 1982.

== Expenditures ==
The budget announced an increase in 13.2% of expenditures over the fiscal year 1979-80 due partly to increase oil prices and increase in public debt charges. Expenditure especially increased in energy programs (+300%) and economic development (+22%) with a special $350 millions envelope for industrial restructuring and manpower retraining.

== Notes and references ==
=== References ===
==== Budget documents ====
- The Budget (PDF). Ottawa. 28 October 1980.
- Budget Papers (PDF). Ottawa. 28 October 1980.
- Budget in brief (PDF). Ottawa. 28 October 1980.
