= Anti-Inflation Act =

Canadian federal law regarding price controls

Parliament of Canada
- Long title: An Act to provide for the restraint of profit margins, prices, dividends and compensation in Canada
- Considered by: House of Commons
- Passed: 3 December 1975
- Considered by: Senate
- Passed: 10 December 1975
- Royal assent: 15 December 1975

Legislative history

Initiating chamber: House of Commons
- Bill citation: Bill C-73
- Introduced by: Donald Stovel Macdonald
- First reading: 16 October 1975
- Second reading: 27 October 1975
- Third reading: 3 December 1975

Revising chamber: Senate
- Bill title: C-73
- First reading: 3 December 1975
- Second reading: 9 December 1975
- Third reading: 10 December 1975
- Status: Repealed

The Anti-Inflation Act (French: Loi anti-inflation) was an Act of the Parliament of Canada, introduced by Prime Minister Pierre Trudeau's government and passed in 1975, which aimed to slow down the rapidly increasing price and wage inflation.

== Background ==
Prior to 1975, the Bank of Canada had warned the government about the dangers of the current inflation which was roughly 10% per year. In response, the government introduced Bill C-73, the precursor to the Act, to the Parliament of Canada.

Previously, Pierre Trudeau had mocked the idea in the 1974 Canadian federal election.

== The Act ==
Amongst its many controls, it limited pay increases for federal public employees and those in companies with more than 500 employees to 10 per cent in the first year, 8 per cent the next, and 6 per cent thereafter. Additionally, the Anti-Inflation Board was created to set wages and prices.The price and wage controls were enforced until 1978, and the act was repealed in 1979. A similar program aimed only at the public sector was introduced in 1982.

== Reaction ==
The Act proved highly contentious and there was much debate over whether the Parliament of Canada had overstepped its powers in enacting the law. Consequently, the government put a reference question to the Supreme Court of Canada, and in 1976 the court passed down its opinion in Reference Re Anti-Inflation Act, which declared the law constitutional.

== See also ==
- Incomes policy
