= International Academy of Comparative Law =

The International Academy of Comparative Law first published its proceedings after its inaugural meeting in Berlin in 1928. The organization was founded in 1924 at The Hague. The original membership of the organization had eighty titular members from fifty countries.
