= Ola Honningdal Grytten =

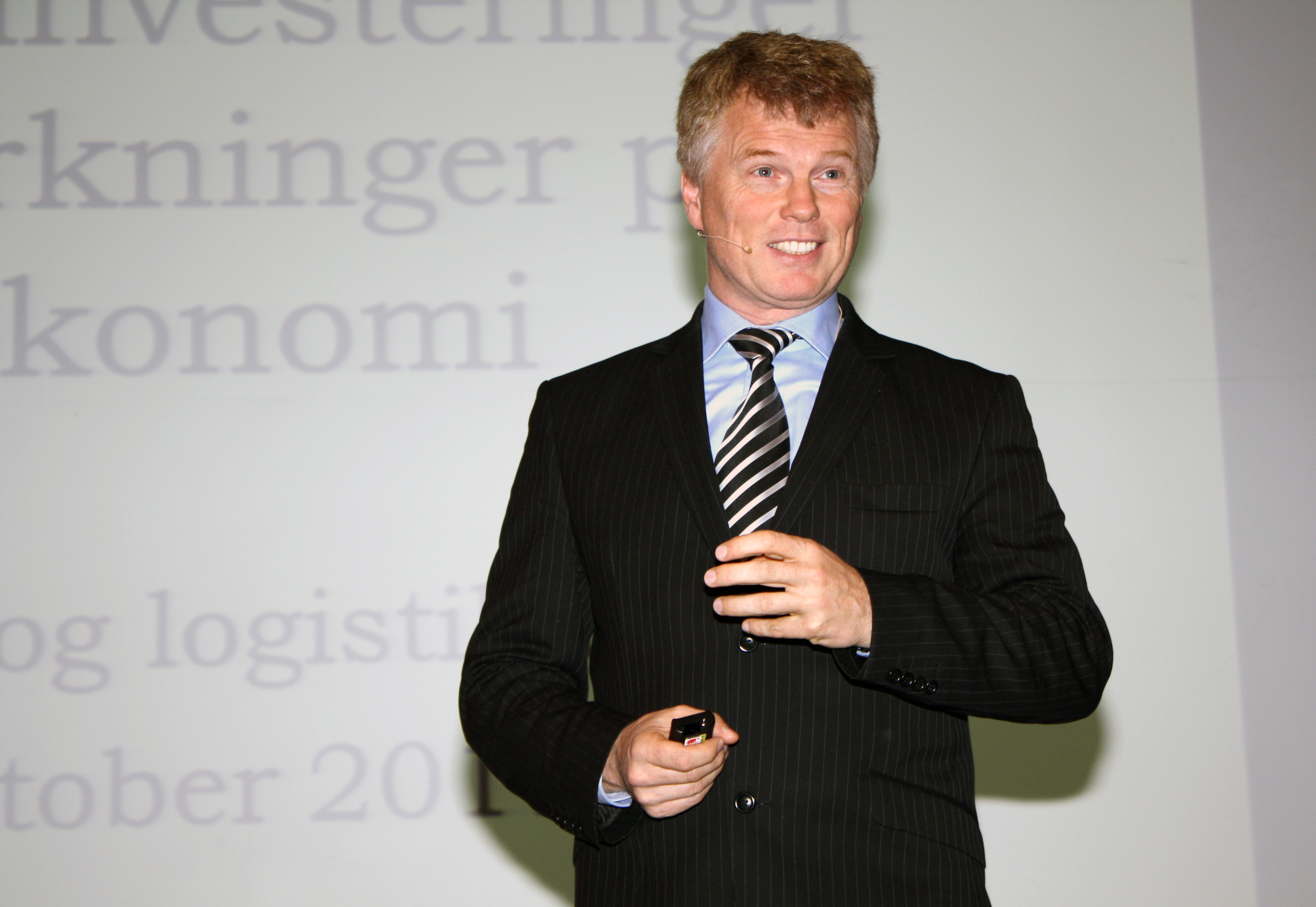
Ola Honningdal Grytten Credit: Trondheim Harbour (2011)

Ola Honningdal Grytten (born 30 May 1964) is a Norwegian professor, economist and economic historian. Born in Gothenburg, Sweden, he graduated with a MSc in economics degree cand.oecon. degree and dr oecon degree from the Norwegian School of Economics. He also holds a Bachelors in Economic History and a Master in Financial Economics. Grytten is the author of more than 40 books and 150 research papers in his field. He has received several awards for excellent research and teaching. He has served as professor in several universities and adviser to central banks.
