= Ingeborg Grytten =

Norwegian writer

- Born: Ingeborg Andersdatter Grytten c. 1668; Holmesdal, Sunnfjord, Norway
- Died: After 1705; Holmesdal, Sunnfjord, Norway
- Notable work: Kaars-Frugt

Ingeborg Andersdatter Grytten (c. 1668 – after 1705) was a Norwegian poet and hymn writer. Grytten and Dorothe Engelbretsdatter were the only known Norwegian poets in the 17th century. Her life was defined by the onset of leprosy from an early age.

== Life ==
Ingeborg Andersdatter Grytten was born in around 1668 in Holmesdal, Sunnfjord to Maren Ludvigsdotter Munthe (1635–1715) and Anders Johannesson Grytten (c. 1620–c. 1685), a priest in the Holmesdal parish from 1655 to 1685, and lived at the vicarage. As well as Grytten, they had five other children.

Due to her illness, Grytten grew up and lived her entire life in isolation at the vicarage in Holmesdal in Sunnfjord in a wealthy home with many books, where she became acquainted with the works of Thomas Kingo and Dorothe Engelbretsdatter. Her illness is believed to be the reason why her poetry is characterised by a strong religiosity in which she puts her trust in the salvation of God's power. Twenty of Grytten's hymns were published in the hymn book Kaars-Frugt in 1713. The work expresses a yearning for death and for God's liberation of the soul from the body. According to the book's subtitle, it contains "20 divine songs, as well as morning and evening hymns for each day of the week, as well as the 7 King David Poenitentse hymns". As per the custom of the time, her name is not stated in the collection, however, Grytten was known as the writer of the hymns at the time. The collection was completed as early as 1701, as the bishop of Bergen Niels Randulf had recommended it to be published and was supported by theology professor Johan Steenbuch and it is unknown why it took until 1713 for Kaars-Frugt to be published. The collection was well received when it was finally published, and it was republished in 1769, 1786 and 1849.

Grytten died in Holmesdal after 1705, but the exact year of her death is unknown.
