= 20th Canadian Ministry =

Government cabinet of Canada (1968–1979)

20th Canadian Ministry 20e conseil des ministres du Canada
- 20th ministry of Canada

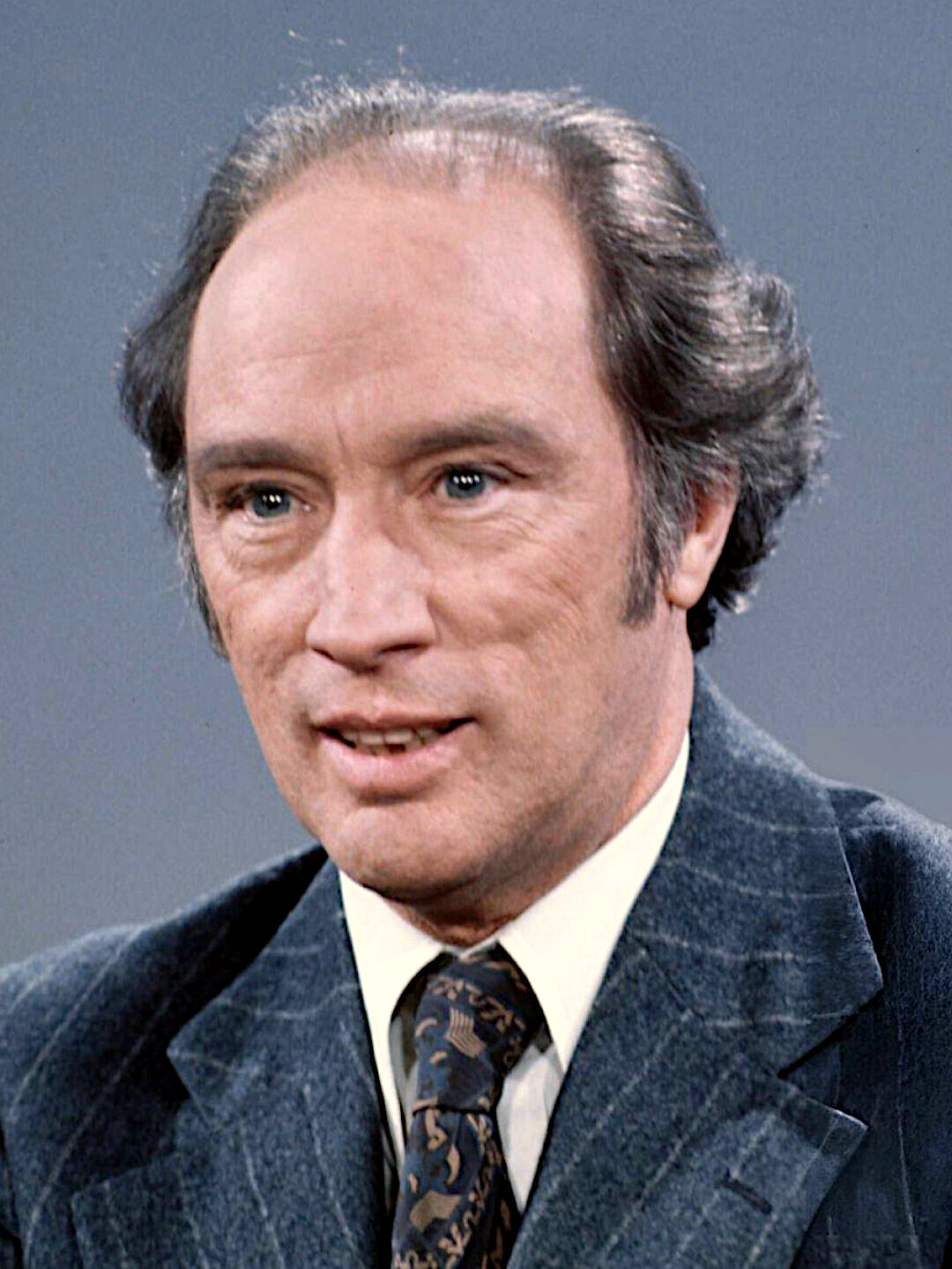
- Date formed: 20 April 1968
- Date dissolved: 4 June 1979

People and organizations
- Monarch: Elizabeth II
- Governor General: Roland Michener (1968–1974); Jules Léger (1974–1979); Edward Schreyer (1979)
- Prime Minister: Pierre Trudeau
- Prime Minister's history: Premierships of Pierre Trudeau
- Deputy Prime Minister: Allan MacEachen (1977–1979)
- Member party: Liberal
- Status in legislature: Minority (1968); Majority (1968–1972); Minority (1972–1974); Majority (1974–1979)
- Opposition party: Progressive Conservative
- Opposition leader: Robert Stanfield (1968–1976); Joe Clark (1976–1979)

History
- Incoming formation: 1968 Liberal leadership election
- Outgoing formation: 1979 federal election
- Elections: 1968, 1972, 1974
- Legislature terms: 27th Canadian Parliament; 28th Canadian Parliament; 29th Canadian Parliament; 30th Canadian Parliament
- Budgets: 1968, 1969, 1970, 1971, 1972, 1973, ~~May 1974~~, November 1974, 1975, 1976, 1977, April 1978, November 1978
- Predecessor: 19th Canadian Ministry
- Successor: 21st Canadian Ministry

The Twentieth Canadian Ministry was the first cabinet chaired by Prime Minister Pierre Trudeau. It governed Canada from 20 April 1968 to 4 June 1979, including only the last three days of the 27th Canadian Parliament, and all of the 28th, 29th, and 30th. The government was formed by the Liberal Party of Canada. Trudeau was also Prime Minister in the 22nd Canadian Ministry (1980–1984).

== Ministers ==
Portfolio	Minister	Term	
Portfolio	Minister	Start	End
Prime Minister	Pierre Trudeau	20 April 1968	4 June 1979
Deputy Prime Minister	Allan MacEachen	16 September 1977	4 June 1979
Minister of Agriculture	Joe Greene	20 April 1968	6 July 1968
Minister of Agriculture	Bud Olson	6 July 1968	27 November 1972
Minister of Agriculture	Eugene Whelan	27 November 1972	4 June 1979
Minister of Amateur Sport	Allan MacEachen	20 April 1968	6 July 1968
Minister of Amateur Sport	John Munro	6 July 1968	27 November 1972
Minister of Amateur Sport	Marc Lalonde	27 November 1972	15 September 1976
Minister responsible for the Canadian Dairy Commission	Joe Greene	20 April 1968	6 July 1968
Minister responsible for the Canadian Dairy Commission	Bud Olson	6 July 1968	27 November 1972
Minister responsible for the Canadian Dairy Commission	Eugene Whelan	27 November 1972	4 June 1979
Minister responsible for Canadian International Development Agency	Mitchell Sharp	20 April 1968	8 August 1974
Minister responsible for Canadian International Development Agency	Allan MacEachen	8 August 1974	14 September 1976
Minister responsible for Canadian International Development Agency	Don Jamieson	14 September 1976	4 June 1979
Minister for Canada Mortgage and Housing Corporation	Paul Hellyer	20 April 1968	5 May 1969
Minister for Canada Mortgage and Housing Corporation	Bob Andras	5 May 1969	28 January 1972
Minister for Canada Mortgage and Housing Corporation	Ron Basford	28 January 1972	8 August 1974
Minister for Canada Mortgage and Housing Corporation	Barney Danson	8 August 1974	5 November 1976
Minister for Canada Mortgage and Housing Corporation	André Ouellet	5 November 1976	4 June 1979
Minister for the Canadian Wheat Board	Charles Drury	20 April 1968	6 July 1968
Minister for the Canadian Wheat Board	Jean-Luc Pépin	6 July 1968	15 October 1969
Minister for the Canadian Wheat Board	Otto Lang	15 October 1969	4 June 1979
Minister of Communications	Eric Kierans	1 April 1969	29 April 1971
Minister of Communications	Jean-Pierre Côté (acting)	29 April 1971	11 May 1971
Minister of Communications	Gérard Pelletier (acting)	11 May 1971	12 August 1971
Minister of Communications	Robert Stanbury	12 August 1971	27 November 1972
Minister of Communications	Gérard Pelletier	27 November 1972	29 August 1975
Minister of Communications	Pierre Juneau	29 August 1975	25 October 1975
Minister of Communications	Otto Lang (acting)	25 October 1975	5 December 1975
Minister of Communications	Jeanne Sauvé	5 December 1975	4 June 1979
Minister of Consumer and Corporate Affairs and Registrar General	John Turner	20 April 1968	6 July 1968
Minister of Consumer and Corporate Affairs and Registrar General	Ron Basford	6 July 1968	28 January 1972
Minister of Consumer and Corporate Affairs and Registrar General	Bob Andras	28 January 1972	27 November 1972
Minister of Consumer and Corporate Affairs and Registrar General	Herb Gray	27 November 1972	8 August 1974
Minister of Consumer and Corporate Affairs and Registrar General	André Ouellet	8 August 1974	16 March 1976
Minister of Consumer and Corporate Affairs and Registrar General	Bryce Mackasey (acting)	16 March 1976	8 April 1976
Minister of Consumer and Corporate Affairs and Registrar General	Bryce Mackasey	8 April 1976	14 September 1976
Minister of Consumer and Corporate Affairs and Registrar General	Anthony Abbott	14 September 1976	16 September 1977
Minister of Consumer and Corporate Affairs and Registrar General	Warren Allmand	16 September 1977	4 June 1979
Minister for Defence Construction Limited	Léo Cadieux	20 April 1968	17 September 1970
Minister for Defence Construction Limited	Charles Drury (acting)	17 September 1970	24 September 1970
Minister for Defence Construction Limited	Donald Stovel Macdonald	24 September 1970	28 January 1972
Minister for Defence Construction Limited	Edgar Benson	28 January 1972	1 September 1972
Minister for Defence Construction Limited	Jean-Eudes Dubé (acting)	1 September 1972	7 September 1972
Minister for Defence Construction Limited	Charles Drury (acting)	7 September 1972	27 November 1972
Minister for Defence Construction Limited	James Armstrong Richardson	27 November 1972	13 October 1976
Minister for Defence Construction Limited	Barney Danson	13 October 1976	4 June 1979
Minister of Defence Production	Charles Drury	20 April 1968	6 July 1968
Minister of Defence Production	Don Jamieson	6 July 1968	1 April 1969
Minister of State for Economic Development	Bob Andras	24 November 1978	4 June 1979
Minister of Employment and Immigration	Bud Cullen	15 August 1977	4 June 1979
Minister of Energy, Mines, and Resources	Jean-Luc Pépin	20 April 1968	6 July 1968
Minister of Energy, Mines, and Resources	Joe Greene	6 July 1968	28 January 1972
Minister of Energy, Mines, and Resources	Donald Stovel Macdonald	28 January 1972	26 September 1975
Minister of Energy, Mines, and Resources	Alastair Gillespie	26 September 1975	4 June 1979
Minister of the Environment	Jack Davis	11 June 1971	8 August 1974
Minister of the Environment	Jeanne Sauvé	8 August 1974	5 December 1975
Minister of the Environment	Roméo LeBlanc (acting)	5 December 1975	22 January 1976
Minister of the Environment	Jean Marchand	22 January 1976	1 July 1976
Minister of the Environment	Roméo LeBlanc	1 July 1976	2 April 1979
Minister of the Environment	Leonard Marchand	2 April 1979	4 June 1979
Secretary of State for External Affairs	Mitchell Sharp	20 April 1968	8 August 1974
Secretary of State for External Affairs	Allan MacEachen	8 August 1974	14 September 1976
Secretary of State for External Affairs	Don Jamieson	14 September 1976	4 June 1979
Minister of Finance	Edgar Benson	20 April 1968	28 January 1972
Minister of Finance	John Turner	28 January 1972	10 September 1975
Minister of Finance	Charles Drury (acting)	10 September 1975	26 September 1975
Minister of Finance	Donald Stovel Macdonald	26 September 1975	16 September 1977
Minister of Finance	Jean Chrétien	16 September 1977	4 June 1979
Minister of Fisheries	Hédard Robichaud	20 April 1968	6 July 1968
Minister of Fisheries	Jack Davis	6 July 1968	1 April 1969
Minister of Fisheries and Forestry	Jack Davis	1 April 1969	11 June 1971
Minister of Fisheries	Jack Davis	11 June 1971	8 August 1974
Minister of Fisheries	Jeanne Sauvé	8 August 1974	5 December 1975
Minister of Fisheries	Roméo LeBlanc (acting)	5 December 1975	22 January 1976
Minister of Fisheries	Jean Marchand	22 January 1976	1 July 1976
Minister of Fisheries	Roméo LeBlanc	1 July 1976	2 April 1979
Minister of Fisheries and Oceans	Roméo LeBlanc	2 April 1979	4 June 1979
Minister of Forestry and Rural Development	Maurice Sauvé	20 April 1968	6 July 1968
Minister of Forestry and Rural Development	Jean Marchand	6 July 1968	1 April 1969
Minister responsible for Housing	Paul Hellyer	20 April 1968	30 April 1969
Minister responsible for Housing	James Armstrong Richardson (acting)	30 April 1969	5 May 1969
Minister responsible for Housing	Bob Andras	5 May 1969	30 June 1971
Minister of Indian Affairs and Northern Development	Arthur Laing	20 April 1968	6 July 1968
Minister of Indian Affairs and Northern Development	Jean Chrétien	6 July 1968	8 August 1974
Minister of Indian Affairs and Northern Development	Judd Buchanan	8 August 1974	14 September 1976
Minister of Indian Affairs and Northern Development	Warren Allmand	14 September 1976	16 September 1977
Minister of Indian Affairs and Northern Development	Hugh Faulkner	16 September 1977	4 June 1979
Minister of Industry	Charles Drury	20 April 1968	6 July 1968
Minister of Industry	Jean-Luc Pépin	6 July 1968	1 April 1969
Minister of Industry, Trade, and Commerce	Jean-Luc Pépin	1 April 1969	27 November 1972
Minister of Industry, Trade, and Commerce	Alastair Gillespie	27 November 1972	26 September 1975
Minister of Industry, Trade, and Commerce	Don Jamieson	26 September 1975	14 September 1976
Minister of Industry, Trade, and Commerce	Jean Chrétien	14 September 1976	16 September 1977
Minister of Industry, Trade, and Commerce	Jack Horner	16 September 1977	4 June 1979
Minister of Justice and Attorney General	Pierre Trudeau	20 April 1968	6 July 1968
Minister of Justice and Attorney General	John Turner	6 July 1968	28 January 1972
Minister of Justice and Attorney General	Otto Lang	28 January 1972	26 September 1975
Minister of Justice and Attorney General	Ron Basford	26 September 1975	3 August 1978
Minister of Justice and Attorney General	Otto Lang (acting)	3 August 1978	24 November 1978
Minister of Justice and Attorney General	Marc Lalonde	24 November 1978	4 June 1979
Minister of Labour	Jean-Luc Pépin	20 April 1968	6 July 1968
Minister of Labour	Bryce Mackasey	6 July 1968	28 January 1972
Minister of Labour	Martin O'Connell	28 January 1972	27 November 1972
Minister of Labour	John Munro	27 November 1972	8 September 1978
Minister of Labour	André Ouellet (acting)	8 September 1978	24 November 1978
Minister of Labour	Martin O'Connell	24 November 1978	4 June 1979
Leader of the Government in the House of Commons	Allan MacEachen	20 April 1968	12 September 1968
Leader of the Government in the House of Commons	Donald Stovel Macdonald	12 September 1968	24 September 1970
Leader of the Government in the House of Commons	Allan MacEachen	24 September 1970	8 August 1974
Leader of the Government in the House of Commons	Mitchell Sharp	8 August 1974	14 September 1976
Leader of the Government in the House of Commons	Allan MacEachen	14 September 1976	4 June 1979
Leader of the Government in the Senate	Paul Martin Sr.	20 April 1968	8 August 1974
Leader of the Government in the Senate	Ray Perrault	8 August 1974	4 June 1979
Minister of Manpower and Immigration	Jean Marchand	20 April 1968	6 July 1968
Minister of Manpower and Immigration	Allan MacEachen	6 July 1968	24 September 1970
Minister of Manpower and Immigration	Otto Lang	24 September 1970	28 January 1972
Minister of Manpower and Immigration	Bryce Mackasey	28 January 1972	27 November 1972
Minister of Manpower and Immigration	Bob Andras	27 November 1972	14 September 1976
Minister of Manpower and Immigration	Bud Cullen	14 September 1976	15 August 1977
Minister responsible for Metric Commission	Ron Basford	12 August 1971	28 January 1972
Minister responsible for Metric Commission	Bob Andras	28 January 1972	27 November 1972
Minister responsible for Metric Commission	Herb Gray	27 November 1972	8 August 1974
Minister responsible for Metric Commission	André Ouellet	8 August 1974	16 March 1976
Minister responsible for Metric Commission	Bryce Mackasey (acting)	16 March 1976	8 April 1976
Minister responsible for Metric Commission	Bryce Mackasey	8 April 1976	14 September 1976
Minister responsible for Metric Commission	Anthony Abbott	14 September 1976	16 September 1977
Minister responsible for Metric Commission	Warren Allmand	16 September 1977	4 June 1979
Minister for National Capital Commission	George McIlraith	20 April 1968	6 July 1968
Minister for National Capital Commission	Arthur Laing	6 July 1968	28 January 1972
Minister for National Capital Commission	Jean-Eudes Dubé	28 January 1972	8 August 1974
Minister for National Capital Commission	Charles Drury	8 August 1974	14 September 1976
Minister for National Capital Commission	Judd Buchanan	14 September 1976	24 November 1978
Minister for National Capital Commission	André Ouellet	24 November 1978	4 June 1979
Associate Minister of National Defence	Vacant	20 April 1968	4 June 1979
Minister of National Defence	Léo Cadieux	20 April 1968	17 September 1970
Minister of National Defence	Charles Drury (acting)	17 September 1970	24 September 1970
Minister of National Defence	Donald Stovel Macdonald	24 September 1970	28 January 1972
Minister of National Defence	Edgar Benson	28 January 1972	1 September 1972
Minister of National Defence	Jean-Eudes Dubé (acting)	1 September 1972	7 September 1972
Minister of National Defence	Charles Drury (acting)	7 September 1972	27 November 1972
Minister of National Defence	James Armstrong Richardson	27 November 1972	13 October 1976
Minister of National Defence	Barney Danson	13 October 1976	4 June 1979
Minister of National Health and Welfare	Allan MacEachen	20 April 1968	6 July 1968
Minister of National Health and Welfare	John Munro	6 July 1968	27 November 1972
Minister of National Health and Welfare	Marc Lalonde	27 November 1972	16 September 1977
Minister of National Health and Welfare	Monique Bégin	16 September 1977	4 June 1979
Minister of National Revenue	Jean Chrétien	20 April 1968	6 July 1968
Minister of National Revenue	Jean-Pierre Côté	6 July 1968	24 September 1970
Minister of National Revenue	Herb Gray	24 September 1970	27 November 1972
Minister of National Revenue	Robert Stanbury	27 November 1972	8 August 1974
Minister of National Revenue	Ron Basford	8 August 1974	26 September 1975
Minister of National Revenue	Bud Cullen	26 September 1975	14 September 1976
Minister of National Revenue	Monique Bégin	14 September 1976	16 September 1977
Minister of National Revenue	Joseph-Philippe Guay	16 September 1977	24 November 1978
Minister of National Revenue	Anthony Abbott	24 November 1978	4 June 1979
Postmaster General	Jean-Pierre Côté	20 April 1968	6 July 1968
Postmaster General	Eric Kierans	6 July 1968	29 April 1971
Postmaster General	Jean-Pierre Côté	29 April 1971	27 November 1972
Postmaster General	André Ouellet	27 November 1972	8 August 1974
Postmaster General	Bryce Mackasey	8 August 1974	14 September 1976
Postmaster General	Jean-Jacques Blais	14 September 1976	2 February 1978
Postmaster General	Gilles Lamontagne	2 February 1978	4 June 1979
President of the Privy Council	Pierre Trudeau (acting)	20 April 1968	2 May 1968
President of the Privy Council	Allan MacEachen (acting)	2 May 1968	6 July 1968
President of the Privy Council	Donald Stovel Macdonald	6 July 1968	24 September 1970
President of the Privy Council	Allan MacEachen	24 September 1970	8 August 1974
President of the Privy Council	Mitchell Sharp	8 August 1974	14 September 1976
President of the Privy Council	Allan MacEachen	14 September 1976	4 June 1979
Minister of Public Works	George McIlraith	20 April 1968	6 July 1968
Minister of Public Works	Arthur Laing	6 July 1968	28 January 1972
Minister of Public Works	Jean-Eudes Dubé	28 January 1972	8 August 1974
Minister of Public Works	Charles Drury	8 August 1974	14 September 1976
Minister of Public Works	Judd Buchanan	14 September 1976	24 November 1978
Minister of Public Works	André Ouellet	24 November 1978	4 June 1979
Receiver General for Canada	Edgar Benson	20 April 1968	1 April 1969
Minister of Regional Economic Expansion	Jean Marchand	1 April 1969	27 November 1972
Minister of Regional Economic Expansion	Don Jamieson	27 November 1972	26 September 1975
Minister of Regional Economic Expansion	Marcel Lessard	26 September 1975	4 June 1979
Minister responsible for Royal Canadian Mint	Don Jamieson	1 April 1969	5 May 1969
Minister responsible for Royal Canadian Mint	James Armstrong Richardson	5 May 1969	27 November 1972
Minister responsible for Royal Canadian Mint	Jean-Pierre Goyer	27 November 1972	24 November 1978
Minister responsible for Royal Canadian Mint	Pierre de Bané	24 November 1978	4 June 1979
Minister of State for Science and Technology	Alastair Gillespie	12 August 1971	27 November 1972
Minister of State for Science and Technology	Jeanne Sauvé	27 November 1972	8 August 1974
Minister of State for Science and Technology	Charles Drury	8 August 1974	14 September 1976
Minister of State for Science and Technology	Hugh Faulkner	14 September 1976	16 September 1977
Minister of State for Science and Technology	Judd Buchanan	16 September 1977	24 November 1978
Minister of State for Science and Technology	Alastair Gillespie	24 November 1978	4 June 1979
Secretary of State for Canada	Jean Marchand	20 April 1968	6 July 1968
Secretary of State for Canada	Gérard Pelletier	6 July 1968	27 November 1972
Secretary of State for Canada	Hugh Faulkner	27 November 1972	14 September 1976
Secretary of State for Canada	John Roberts	14 September 1976	4 June 1979
Senior Minister	Paul Hellyer	30 April 1968	23 April 1969
Solicitor General	John Turner	20 April 1968	6 July 1968
Solicitor General	George McIlraith	6 July 1968	22 December 1970
Solicitor General	Jean-Pierre Goyer	22 December 1970	27 November 1972
Solicitor General	Warren Allmand	27 November 1972	14 September 1976
Solicitor General	Francis Fox	14 September 1976	28 January 1978
Solicitor General	Ron Basford (acting)	28 January 1978	2 February 1978
Solicitor General	Jean-Jacques Blais	2 February 1978	4 June 1979
Minister responsible for Standards Council of Canada	Ron Basford	24 September 1970	28 January 1972
Minister responsible for Standards Council of Canada	Bob Andras	28 January 1972	27 November 1972
Minister responsible for Standards Council of Canada	Herb Gray	27 November 1972	8 August 1974
Minister responsible for Standards Council of Canada	André Ouellet	8 August 1974	16 March 1976
Minister responsible for Standards Council of Canada	Bryce Mackasey (acting)	16 March 1976	8 April 1976
Minister responsible for Standards Council of Canada	Bryce Mackasey	8 April 1976	14 September 1976
Minister responsible for Standards Council of Canada	Anthony Abbott	14 September 1976	16 September 1977
Minister responsible for Standards Council of Canada	Warren Allmand	16 September 1977	4 June 1979
Minister responsible for the Status of Women	Bob Andras	12 August 1971	8 August 1974
Minister responsible for the Status of Women	Marc Lalonde	8 August 1974	4 June 1979
Minister of Supply and Services and Receiver General	Don Jamieson	1 April 1969	5 May 1969
Minister of Supply and Services and Receiver General	James Armstrong Richardson	5 May 1969	27 November 1972
Minister of Supply and Services and Receiver General	Jean-Pierre Goyer	27 November 1972	24 November 1978
Minister of Supply and Services and Receiver General	Pierre de Bané	24 November 1978	4 June 1979
Minister of Trade and Commerce	Charles Drury	20 April 1968	6 July 1968
Minister of Trade and Commerce	Jean-Luc Pépin	6 July 1968	1 April 1969
Minister of Transport	Paul Hellyer	20 April 1968	30 April 1969
Minister of Transport	James Armstrong Richardson (acting)	30 April 1969	5 May 1969
Minister of Transport	Don Jamieson	5 May 1969	27 November 1972
Minister of Transport	Jean Marchand	27 November 1972	26 September 1975
Minister of Transport	Otto Lang	26 September 1975	4 June 1979
President of the Treasury Board	Edgar Benson	20 April 1968	6 July 1968
President of the Treasury Board	Charles Drury	6 July 1968	8 August 1974
President of the Treasury Board	Jean Chrétien	8 August 1974	14 September 1976
President of the Treasury Board	Bob Andras	14 September 1976	24 November 1978
President of the Treasury Board	Judd Buchanan	24 November 1978	4 June 1979
Minister of State for Urban Affairs	Bob Andras	30 June 1971	28 January 1972
Minister of State for Urban Affairs	Ron Basford	28 January 1972	8 August 1974
Minister of State for Urban Affairs	Barney Danson	8 August 1974	3 November 1976
Minister of State for Urban Affairs	André Ouellet	3 November 1976	2 April 1979
Minister of Veterans Affairs	Roger Teillet	20 April 1968	6 July 1968
Minister of Veterans Affairs	Jean-Eudes Dubé	6 July 1968	28 January 1972
Minister of Veterans Affairs	Arthur Laing	28 January 1972	27 November 1972
Minister of Veterans Affairs	Daniel MacDonald	27 November 1972	4 June 1979
Minister of State	Martin O'Connell	12 August 1971	28 January 1972
Minister of State	Pat Mahoney	28 January 1972	27 November 1972
Minister of State	Stanley Haidasz (Multiculturalism)	27 November 1972	8 August 1974
Minister of State	Bryce Mackasey	3 June 1974	8 August 1974
Minister of State	Roméo LeBlanc (Fisheries)	8 August 1974	14 September 1976
Minister of State	Leonard Marchand (Environment) (Small Businesses)	14 September 1976	2 April 1979
Minister of State	Iona Campagnolo (Fitness and Amateur Sport)	15 September 1976	4 June 1979
Minister of State	Joseph-Philippe Guay (Multiculturalism)	21 April 1977	16 September 1977
Minister of State	Marc Lalonde (Federal-Provincial Relations)	16 September 1977	24 November 1978
Minister of State	Norman Cafik (Multiculturalism)	16 September 1977	4 June 1979
Minister of State	Anthony Abbott (Small Businesses)	16 September 1977	4 June 1979
Minister of State	John Mercer Reid (Federal-Provincial Relations)	24 November 1978	4 June 1979
Minister without Portfolio	Charles Granger	20 April 1968	6 July 1968
Minister without Portfolio	Paul Martin Sr.	20 April 1968	1 April 1969
Minister without Portfolio	Donald Stovel Macdonald	20 April 1968	6 July 1968
Minister without Portfolio	Bryce Mackasey	20 April 1968	6 July 1968
Minister without Portfolio	John Munro	20 April 1968	6 July 1968
Minister without Portfolio	Gérard Pelletier	20 April 1968	6 July 1968
Minister without Portfolio	Jack Davis	26 April 1968	6 July 1968
Minister without Portfolio	Bob Andras (Housing) (Status of Women)	6 July 1968	30 June 1971
Minister without Portfolio	Otto Lang	6 July 1968	24 September 1970
Minister without Portfolio	James Armstrong Richardson	6 July 1968	5 May 1969
Minister without Portfolio	Herb Gray	20 October 1969	24 September 1970
Minister without Portfolio	Robert Stanbury	20 October 1969	12 August 1971
Minister without Portfolio	Jean-Pierre Côté (Post Office)	24 September 1970	11 June 1971
Minister without Portfolio	Jean Marchand	26 September 1975	22 January 1976
Minister without Portfolio	Joseph-Philippe Guay	3 November 1976	21 April 1977
Minister without Portfolio	Jack Horner	21 April 1977	16 September 1977
Minister without Portfolio	Gilles Lamontagne	19 January 1978	2 February 1978

== Succession ==
Ministries of Canada
Preceded by 19th Canadian Ministry	20th Canadian Ministry; 1968–1979	Succeeded by 21st Canadian Ministry
