= Canada Deposit Insurance Corporation =

Canadian federal Crown Corporation

- Société d'assurance-dépôts du Canada

Agency overview
- Formed: 4 March 1967
- Jurisdiction: Government of Canada
- Headquarters: Ottawa
- Minister responsible: François-Philippe Champagne, Minister of Finance
- Agency executive: Martin J. G. Gly, Chair of the Board
- Website: www.cdic.ca

The Canada Deposit Insurance Corporation (CDIC; French: Société d'assurance-dépôts du Canada) is a Canadian federal Crown Corporation created by Parliament in 1967 to provide deposit insurance to depositors in Canadian commercial banks and savings institutions. CDIC insures Canadians' deposits held at Canadian banks (and other member institutions) up to C$100,000 in case of a bank failure. CDIC automatically insures many types of savings against the failure of a financial institution. However, the bank must be a CDIC member and not all savings are insured. CDIC is also Canada's resolution authority for banks, federally regulated credit unions, trust and loan companies as well as associations governed by the Cooperative Credit Associations Act that take deposits.

== History ==
The Canada Deposit Insurance Corporation was created 4 March 1967 (under Schedule III, Part 1 of the Financial Administration Act and Canada Deposit Insurance Corporation Act). It is similar to the Federal Deposit Insurance Corporation in the United States. Since 1967, 43 financial institutions have failed in Canada and all 43 were members of CDIC. There have been no failures since 1996. On 31 December 2017, member institutions numbered 82, according to CDIC's Summary of the Corporate Plan, 2018/19 to 2022/2023.

The roots of the CDIC can be traced back to the 19th century, such as the Upper Canada's financial problems of 1866, the North American panic of 1873 and the 1923 failure of Toronto's Home Bank, symbolized today by Casa Loma. Historically in Canada regional risk has always been spread nationally within each large bank, unlike the uneven geography of US unit banking, layered with savings & loans of regional or national size, who in turn disperse their risk through investors. The Canadian banking system is regulated in part by the Office of the Superintendent of Financial Institutions who can, in an extreme case, close a financial institution. Alongside Canada's mortgage rules, the risk of bank failures similar to the US are slim, but not impossible.

The original amount of insurance per eligible deposit account was $20,000. This was raised to $60,000 in 1983. As of 2005, CDIC covers $100,000 in eligible deposits per insured category at each CDIC member institution in the event of a failure.

On 22 June 2017, CDIC was formally designated as the resolution authority for Canada's largest banks, a recognition of CDIC's role in handling the failure of its member institutions. CDIC has a number of tools to assist or resolve a failing member institution.

As of 30 April 2020, coverage was expanded to include deposits in foreign currencies, and deposits with terms greater than 5 years, but coverage for travellers' cheques was eliminated (as member institutions no longer offer them). As of 30 April 2022, separate coverage was added for Registered Education Savings Plans (RESPs) and Registered Disability Savings Plans (RDSPs), but deposits in mortgage tax accounts will no longer be considered a separate category.

== Coverage ==
Insurance is restricted to CDIC member institutions, and covers $100,000 in certain types of deposits, such as savings accounts and chequing accounts, guaranteed investment certificates (GICs) and other term deposits, money orders, and bank drafts issued by CDIC members and cheques certified by CDIC members, and debentures issued by loan companies that are CDIC members. Eligible deposits are insured separately in each of nine categories:

- in one name
- in more than one name
- in a Registered retirement savings plan (RRSP)
- in a Registered retirement income fund (RRIF)
- in a Tax-free savings account (TFSA)
- in a first home savings account (FHSA)
- in a Registered education savings plan (RESP)
- in a Registered disability savings plan (RDSP)
- in a trust

A key characteristic of CDIC deposit protection is separate coverage. Given that each deposit category is protected separately, depositors can benefit from protection far in excess of $100,000 (i.e. they can be protected for $100,000 in each of the nine categories).

Most credit unions (and caisses populaires in Quebec or New Brunswick) are not insured federally, because they are created under provincial charters and backed by provincial insurance corporations which generally follow the CDIC model. Federal credit unions, such as the UNI Financial Cooperation caisse in New Brunswick, are incorporated under federal charters and are members of CDIC. ATB Financial, a financial institution owned by the Government of Alberta, is insured directly by the Alberta provincial government rather than through a federal or provincial insurance corporation.

Funds in foreign banks operating in Canada may or may not be covered depending on whether they are members of CDIC.

Not all types of investments are covered. The general principle is to cover reasonable deposits and savings, but not deposits deliberately positioned to take risks for gain, such as mutual funds, stocks, or cryptocurrencies.

== Current financial position ==
According to CDIC's Quarterly Financial Report of 31 December 2017, CDIC protects $774 billion CAD in insured deposits. CDIC's ex ante funding level is $4.2 billion, representing 55 basis points of insured deposits.

== List of financial collapses since 1967 ==
- Commonwealth Trust Company 1970
- Security Trust Company Limited 1972
- Astra Trust Company 1980
- District Trust Company 1982
- AMIC Mortgage Investment Corporation 1983
- Crown Trust Company 1983
- Fidelity Trust Company 1983
- Greymac Mortgage Corporation 1983
- Greymac Trust Company 1983
- Seaway Mortgage Corporation 1983
- Seaway Trust Company 1983
- Northguard Mortgage Corporation 1984
- CCB Mortgage Investment Corporation 1985
- Canadian Commercial Bank 1985
- Continental Trust Company 1985
- London Loan Limited 1985
- Northland Bank 1985
- Pioneer Trust Company 1985
- Western Capital Trust Company 1985
- Bank of British Columbia 1986
- Bank of British Columbia Mortgage Corporation 1986
- Columbia Trust Company 1986
- North West Trust Company 1987
- Principal Savings & Trust Company 1987
- Financial Trust Company 1988
- Settlers Savings and Mortgage Corporation 1990
- Bank of Credit and Commerce Canada 1991
- Saskatchewan Trust Company 1991
- Standard Loan Company 1991
- Standard Trust Company 1991
- Shoppers Trust Company 1992
- Central Guaranty Mortgage Corporation 1992
- Central Guaranty Trust Company 1992
- First City Trust Company 1992
- First City Mortgage Company 1992
- Dominion Trust Company 1993
- Prenor Trust Company of Canada 1993
- Confederation Trust Company 1994
- Monarch Trust Company 1994
- Income Trust Company 1995
- North American Trust Company 1995
- NAL Mortgage Company 1995
- Security Home Mortgage Corporation 1996

== See also ==
- Deposit insurance
- Banking in Canada
- Federal Deposit Insurance Corporation (U.S. counterpart)
- List of financial supervisory authorities by country

=== Related agencies and programs ===
- Canadian Credit Union Association
- Canadian Investor Protection Fund, a similar program for investment (stocks, bonds) accounts
