= Mortgage investment corporation =

Type of investment and lending company in Canada

Requires updating to reflect the current Income Tax Act and the growth of MICs that trade on the TSX.

A mortgage investment corporation (MIC) is an investment and lending company designed specifically for mortgage lending (primarily residential mortgage lending) in Canada. Shares of a MIC are qualified investments under the Income Tax Act (Canada) for RDSPs, RRSPs, RRIFs, TFSAs, or RESPs. Mortgage investment corporations are generally provincially registered and licensed, with the management of the mortgage fund under the direction of provincially licensed mortgage brokers and real estate agents.

A MIC mortgage portfolio can include everything from small second mortgages on residential property to commercial and development mortgages on new projects. Every investment is typically based on a thorough investigation of the property. A typical MIC loan (ideally) should never exceed a specified percentage (typically from 60% to 85%) of the current value of the property. Compare this to a conventional bank's willingness to routinely loan 80% of the value of the property, and sometimes even 100%. MIC's investment strategies vary considerably, as do their rates of return on invested capital. Recent MIC's have generated returns between 6% and 12% for investors, however, returns vary based not only on the investment strategy of the specific MIC but also on the nature of the investment share itself. Some MIC shares are designed to be held for a period as short as a year, and other MIC shares require the investor to hold them for a longer period, up to 10 years in some cases. Yields typically increase when the hold periods are longer, and are lower for shares that are immediately liquid after a short hold period, such as one year.

MIC's are organized for investing in pools of mortgages. Profits generated by MICs are distributed to its shareholders according to their proportional interest. The mortgages are secured on real property, often in conjunction with other forms of security, such as personal and corporate guarantees, general security agreements and assignments of material contracts, such as insurance policies, prepared by lawyers for the MIC.

== Income Tax Act ==
Income Tax Act, Section 130.1: Salient Rules

1. A MIC must have at least 20 shareholders.

2. A MIC is generally widely held. No shareholder may hold more than 25% of the MIC's total share capital. Shareholders whose MIC holding are held in registered accounts (RRSP, TFSA, etc.) are limited to 10% due to regulations restricting ownership in those capital accounts.

3. At least 50% of a MIC's assets must be residential mortgages, and/or cash and insured deposits at Canada Deposit Insurance Corporation member financial institutions.

4. A MIC may invest up to 25% of its assets directly in real estate, but may not develop land or engage in construction. This ceiling on real estate holdings does not include real estate acquired as a result of mortgage default.

5. A MIC is a flow-through investment vehicle, and distributes 100% of its net income to its shareholders.

6. All MIC investments must be in Canada, but a MIC may accept investment capital from outside of Canada.

7. A MIC is a tax-exempt corporation, as its income is instead taxed in the hands of its shareholders.

8. Dividends received with respect to directly held shares, not held within RRSPs or RRIFs, are taxed as interest income in the shareholder's hands. Dividends may be received in the form of cash, or additional shares.

9. MIC shares are qualified RRSP and RRIF investments.

10. A MIC may distribute income dividends, typically interest from mortgages and revenue from property holdings, as well as capital gain dividends, typically from the disposition of its real estate investments.

11. A MIC's annual financial statements must be audited.

12. A MIC may employ financial leverage by using debt to partially fund assets.

== Benefits ==
The following are some benefits associated with investing in a MIC:

- Syndicated in Canadian real estate from both domestic and foreign investors.
- High yield. Targeting > 6%
- Unregulated. Flexible amortization and LTV ratios.
- Special tax treatment (Income tax act section 130.1 or 130.1(6)(B)) Shares of a MIC will generally be “qualified investments” for deferred income plans including registered retirement savings plans (“RRSPs”), registered retirement income funds (“RRIFs”), tax-free savings accounts (“TFSAs”), deferred profit sharing plans (“DPSPs”), registered education savings plans (“RESPs”) and registered disability savings plans (“RDSPs”)

== Risks ==
The following are some risks associated with investing in a MIC:

- Fraud - less likely since a MIC must produce audited financial statements every year. Check out the financial statements and see if the MIC is subject to any lawsuits.
- Losing MIC status - failing to keep within the Income Tax Act rules would cause the MIC to have its income taxed before being distributed to shareholders and would lower returns considerably.
- Manager (In)competence - the success of the MIC depends to a critical degree on the experience, expertise, judgement and good faith of the managers. Do they know the business, do they know their market, and do they have a record of success? Can, and will, they find a steady flow of new mortgages to keep the income flowing in? Think of it as a job interview.
- Leveraging - the rules allow the MIC to borrow money, but some do more than others. The spread between the lower rate of the MIC's borrowing and the lending will boost the ability to generate shareholder returns, but it also increases risk. The audited financial statements will show how much the MIC has borrowed. The prospectus will say if the MIC has a policy to cap what it will borrow. Many of the MICs are fairly short term lenders - 24 months or so - which reduces interest rate risk and should allow the MIC to continually readjust its lending rate to match increases or decreases in general interest rates and keep the spread between its lending and its bank borrowing rates constant.
- Default on mortgages - mortgage borrowers may not pay back what they owe; all the MICs claim to be very careful about who they lend to, but some are explicitly in a niche where the banks don't tread or in second mortgages. The MIC gets a higher interest rate, but that is associated with the higher risk. At least one MIC - Cooper Pacific - has two funds, one that lends out first mortgages with an 8% return and another with second mortgages with a 12% return. "You make your pick, and you take your chances."
- Market downturn / geographical concentration - some MICs, the smaller ones, are concentrated in very limited markets, like Westboro in Ottawa or Edgeworth in northern Alberta. Ottawa is a stable market, but what happens to Edgeworth if the oil industry cools off considerably, as it has done in the past? A general economic recession would everywhere increase the number of borrowers having difficulty to repay.
- Liquidity (can't sell) - the basic method to get your money back is not a sale in some market, since while some MICs (23 or so) are publicly quoted companies, not all are. For non-public MICs management must redeem the shares; the restrictions vary by MIC, whether funds can be sold / withdrawn immediately, or with 30/60/90 days notice; for smaller MICs, the Income Tax Act restriction that each MIC must have at least 20 shareholders might come into play.
- Price sensitivity to yield - As is the case with bonds, Real Estate Investment Trusts and other investments purchased for yield, a rise in interest rates will reduce the price that other investors are willing to pay for shares in the MIC. The degree of risk would depend upon the length of the mortgages held by the portfolio, with those focused on short-term construction mortgages having less risk than longer-term mortgages.
