= 1978 Canadian federal budget =

1978 Canadian federal budget may refer to:

- The April 1978 Canadian federal budget
- The November 1978 Canadian federal budget
