= Individual pension plan =

Canadian retirement savings vehicle

An individual pension plan (IPP) is a Canadian retirement savings vehicle. An IPP is a one-person maximum defined benefit pension plan which allows the plan member to accrue retirement income on a tax-deferred basis. As such, an IPP must conform to the Canadian Income Tax Act (ITA) and regulations (ITR) as well as the requirements of the Canada Revenue Agency (CRA) with respect to defined benefit pension plans. It is possible for an IPP to be a combination plan offering both defined benefits and defined contribution pensions.

== Rules and regulations ==
Some of the IPP rules and regulations are:

- The plan sponsor is an incorporated, active company.
- The plan member is an employee of the corporation who earns T4 or T4PS employment income from the corporation.
- The pension plan document indicates a formula defining the amount of benefit to be earned by the plan member.
- Plan investments must follow strict guidelines.
- Plan sponsor contributions to an IPP, as certified by an actuary, are deductible from corporate income.
- Benefits paid out of the IPP are taxed upon receipt.
- The IPP "member" is a connected person or a highly-paid employee (who is a non-connected person). The ITR defines these members as "specified individuals".
- The "plan sponsor" is the corporation employing the member and paying the member's T4 income. IPP contributions are essentially a portion of the member's compensation transferred via the corporation to the IPP funding vehicle. IPP contributions are not reported as taxable income to the member. Only a pension adjustment is reported in box 52 on the member's T4 slip and the pension adjustment is determined by the plan's actuary or plan administrator based on a formula prescribed in the ITA. Note the pension adjustment is not equal to the amount contributed to the IPP.
- Defined benefit plan contributions must be calculated by an actuary based on the pension benefit formula, the member's age and T4 earnings history, and a set of actuarial assumptions.
- Because the IPP only provides benefits to specified individuals, the IPP is termed a "designated plan". While a designated plan, the IPP is subject to maximum funding restrictions.
- "Maximum funding restrictions" require the actuary to use ITR-mandated actuarial assumptions.
- When the IPP is no longer a designated plan, the actuary may use his or her discretion to determine appropriate actuarial assumptions.
- Combination pension plans offering defined contribution and defined benefit accruals can give taxpayers significant savings advantages over those who use a defined benefit only IPP because the money purchase limit for younger plan members is significantly higher than the defined benefit IPP limit from age 18 to age 38. The combination plan advantage could exceed $800,000 over an entire career from age 18 to age 71.

== See also ==
- Registered retirement savings plan (RRSP)
- Retirement compensation arrangements (RCA)
- Registered retirement income fund (RRIF)
- Superannuation in Australia
- 401(k) – United States
