= 1974 Canadian federal budget =

1974 Canadian federal budget may refer to:

- The May 1974 Canadian federal budget
- The November 1974 Canadian federal budget
