= Canadian Investor Protection Fund =

Canadian financial not-for-profit

The Canadian Investor Protection Fund (CIPF) is a not-for-profit corporation created by the Canadian investment industry in 1969 to protect investor assets in the event of a CIPF member's bankruptcy. CIPF is funded by its members, which are the approximately two hundred investment dealer firms regulated by the Investment Industry Regulatory Organization of Canada (IIROC).

Investors automatically receive coverage by opening an account with a CIPF member. Each investor's coverage, when held at a CIPF member, is:

- CA$ 1 million for all non-registered accounts and TFSAs combined,
- another $1 million for RRSPs and RRIFs,
- and a further $1 million for RESPs.

By example, if a person's assets are distributed between the different classes of accounts (taxable accounts, TFSA, RRSP/RRIF, RESP), they have up to CA$ 3 million in coverage at a particular CIPF member institution. An individual then may also have these accounts at other institutions for further diversification.

When a CIPF member becomes bankrupt, the CIPF will move the investor's account, within the limits of coverage, to another investment dealer where the investor can access it.

== See also ==
- Securities Investor Protection Corporation (U.S. counterpart)
