= Saskatchewan Development Fund Corporation =

Saskatchewan Development Fund Corporation is a crown corporation established by the Government of Saskatchewan in Canada to provide residents with a low risk investment fund. Established in 1973, shares were sold to the general public in Saskatchewan until 1983. The fund continues to operate, however new shares are not offered for sale. The fund had also offered RRSP, Deferred Profit Sharing Plans and term-certain annuities. By 1982, the combined fund reached a value of $42 million; since that point the board has concentrated on the remaining clients and on the orderly wind-down of the fund; by 2007, the funds assets were reduced down to $3.2 million. The development fund act was repealed in 2013.
