= PRIF =

PRIF may refer to:

- Peace Research Institute Frankfurt
- Prescribed Retirement Income Funds, a type of Locked-In Retirement Account
- prolactin release-inhibiting factor
