= Registered home ownership savings plan =

Canadian former tax-deferred savings plan

A registered home ownership savings plan (RHOSP, French: Régime enregistré d'épargne-logement, REÉL) was a federal tax-deferred savings plan intended to encourage home ownership in Canada.

== Functioning ==
Individual taxpayers could contribute up to $10,000 in a RHOSP with a yearly maximum contribution of $1,000. Contributions were deductible for personal income tax purposes and the income earned in the plan was not taxed either. Proceeds from the plan could also be received tax-free if applied to a down payment for a house (and furnitures for certain periods of time).

== History ==
=== Inception (1974) ===
The RHOSP was announced in the May 1974 Canadian federal budget by John Turner on 6 May 1974. Its mechanism is somewhat similar to RRSPs (deductible contributions, income accruing in the plan not taxable) although proceeds from RHOSP could be received tax-free for either:

- a down payment for the acquisition of an owner-occupied dwelling, or
- to buy furnitures for the dwelling (or the spouse's dwelling).

Individuals who already owned a home (either owner-occupied or rented to another person) could not deduct RHOSP contributions.

The May 1974 budget was never adopted as the 29th Canadian Parliament was dissolved prior to the vote of the budget. The RHOSP was however reaffirmed by finance minister John Turner in the November 1974 budget after the Liberals won a majority of seats in the 1974 federal election. Amendments to the Income Tax Act (including the creation of the RHSOP) received royal assent on 13 March 1975.

On 19 December 1974, Quebec's Finance Minister Raymond Garneau announced that the province would create a similar system, retroactively since January 1974. Quebec obtained through negotiations with the federal government that RHOSP managed by credit unions would obtain the same tax incentives as those administrated by chartered bank.

=== Subsequent changes ===
The 1976 Canadian federal budget allowed for transfers of funds between RHOSP (for instance to select a plan with better returns).

The 1977 Canadian federal budget tightened the rules of the RHOSP:

- It removed the purchase of furnitures from the list of usage allowed for tax-free use of RHOSP proceeds starting in 1978;
- Deductible contributions were disallowed for a taxpayer whose spouse owned a home;
- Tax-free rollover of RHSOP funds to a RRSP was suspended;
- The lifetime of RHOSP was capped at 20 years.

In the midst of the early 1980s recession, the 1983 Canadian federal budget presented on 19 April 1983 boosted tax incentives for home ownership (especially acquisition of new constructions):

- A special deduction was provided to buyers of newly constructed homes starting on budget date and until 31 December 1984. The deduction is the difference between $10,000 and deductible contributions previously made to a RHOSP;
  - Taxpayers must make a choice between that special RHOSP top-up deduction and the Canadian Home Ownership Stimulation Plan (CHOSP) which is a special grant provided by the federal government.
- Until 31 December 1983 home furnitures are made eligible to tax-free use of RHOSP proceeds (temporary return to the pre-1977 situation).

=== Extinction ===
==== 1 January 1983 (Quebec) ====
On 1 January 1983 Quebec abolished the tax-savings advantages of RHOSPs. Funds accumulated in existing plans could however still be received tax-free if used for a down payment on an owner-occupied dwelling or eligible home furnitures (for the latter the funds must be used prior to 1 January 1984).

Throughout the 1990s, measures are announced to incentive RHOSP holders to withdraw their remaining funds:

- In the 1992 Quebec budget, Gérard D. Levesque announced that RHOSP proceeds could be withdrawn tax-free to pay for new furnitures;
- In the 1996 Quebec budget, Bernard Landry announced that RHOSP proceeds could be withdrawn tax-free to pay for eligible home improvements.

==== 23 May 1985 (Federal) ====
The Progressive-Conservatives won a landslide majority in the 1984 federal election. In his first budget, Finance Minister Michael Wilson announced that RHOSP contributions would not be deductible if made after 22 May 1985 and no contribution can be made after 31 December 1985. (Note: They would otherwise by reincluded in the taxpayer's income if made between 22 May 1985 and 31 December 1985.) Unlike the decision made in Quebec two years prior, funds left in RHOSP after 22 May 1985 could be withdrawn tax-free, regardless of the use. (Note: Withdrawals made prior to 22 May 1985 must meet usage requirements to be received tax-free.) Income earned in a RHOSP after 31 December 1985 was to be included in the owner's taxable income, effectively ending the last desirable feature of RHOSPs.

The Liberals pledged to reintroduce the RHOSP in a 1986 platform and again during the 1988 federal election campaign.

During the 2021 federal election campaign the Liberal Party of Canada again pledged to introduce a Home Savings Account for Canadians up to age 40 to contribute up to $40,000. Like the RHOSP, money contributed to the account would result in a deduction from taxable income and withdrawals would be tax-free if used to acquire a dwelling. The Liberal platform also includes the doubling of the tax credit for first-time home buyers (from $5,000 to $10,000).

== Related tax incentives ==
=== HBP (federal, since 1992) ===
The home buyers' plan (HBP) announced in the 1992 federal budget is the mechanism that allows to withdraw funds tax-free from RRSPs to use them for the purchase one's first home. The withdrawal must be repaid in full within 15 years.

=== OHOSP (Ontario, 1988-2004) ===
In the lead-up to the 1987 Ontario general election, Liberal leader David Peterson pledged to allocate $500 million over 10 years to incentives for home buying with the creation of a Home Ownership Savings Plan (HOSP) similar to then-defunct RHOSPs. Unlike RHOSPs, HOSP would only be available to taxpayers earning $40,000 a year or less.

The 1988 Ontario budget introduced the Ontario Home Ownership Savings Plan (OHOSP) with the following features (all amounts doubled for couples):

- Annual contributions of up to $2,000 a year could be made;
- A maximum tax credit of 25% of contributions is provided, although it is reduced for individuals earning between $20,000 and $40,000 and fully phased out for those who earn $40,000;
- OHOSP tax credits must be returned if the funds are not used for the purchase of an owner-occupied home;
- Plans could be opened between 1 September 1988 and 31 December 1993;
- A sunset clause has been included: all proceeds from OHOSP plans must be withdrawn by 31 December 1999.

The 1989 Ontario budget provided for partial refund of Land Transfer Tax for home purchases that are eligible for the OHOSP. That tax relief was abolished for plans opened after 31 December 1993.

Throughout 1993, pressure mounted on the provincial government to extend or remove the 31 December 1993 deadline to open OHOSPs.

On 14 December 1993, two weeks before the planned end of the OHSOP program, Finance Minister Floyd Laughren announced that the program would be indefinitely extended. The extension was formalized in the 1994 Ontario budget tabled on 5 May 1994.

Contributions to OHOSP could be made until 18 May 2004, when the first budget of the Dalton McGuinty government announced the termination of the OHSOP program. All plans could be used for home purchases in 2005. Funds withdrawn starting on 1 January 2006 were not subjected to recovery of OHOSP tax credits granted in prior years.

== Related article ==
- Registered retirement savings plan, a savings plan for retirement with similar characteristics.
- First Home Savings Account, a savings plan with similar objectives launched in 2023.
