= Retirement compensation arrangements =

Retirement compensation arrangements (RCAs) are defined under subsection 248(1) of the Canadian Income Tax Act, which allows 100 per cent tax-deductible corporate dollars to be deposited into an RCA, on behalf of the private business owner and/or key employee. No tax is paid by the owner/employee until benefits are received at retirement. Contributions to an RCA should not exceed what is required to fund the "entitlement" under the "generally accepted guidelines" for pensions, which are:

a normal level of benefits would be the same benefit provided under a registered pension plan without regard to the Revenue Canada maximum. This would be 2% x years of service x final three-year average earnings or about 70% of pre-retirement income for an employee with 35 years of service.

— CRA Roundtable discussion, 1998

Failure to follow the "generally accepted guidelines" increases the risk that CRA could deem the RCA not to be an RCA, but rather a salary deferral arrangement (SDA) with substantial tax and penalties payable.

To ensure the RCA qualifies under CRA's "generally accepted guidelines", an "integrated final earnings" calculation determines the entitlement from the RCA and the resulting maximum level of funding. This entitlement calculation must be reviewed and recalculated periodically as circumstances change (e.g., salary, RRSP and RCA investment performance).

An RCA can be funded using various investments including securities, mutual funds, and life insurance.

== History ==
The RCA provisions were set up in 1986 by the CRA as part of pension tax reform to ensure a comprehensive limit on tax assistance provided under employer sponsored pension plans and RRSPs. The RCA rules are an anti-tax avoidance scheme that are meant to eliminate the earning of income on tax deferred employer contributions. They were primarily targeted at non registered plans set up by non-taxable employers. They are used today to fund SERPs for senior executives in public corporations, and private corporations. Many CEOs, professional athletes, and politicians (members of parliament) have RCAs.

== See also ==
- Pension
- Registered retirement savings plan (RRSP)
- Individual pension plan (IPP)
