= Frank Mackenzie Ross =

Canadian Lieutenant Governor (1891–1971)

The Honourable Frank Mackenzie Ross CMG MC
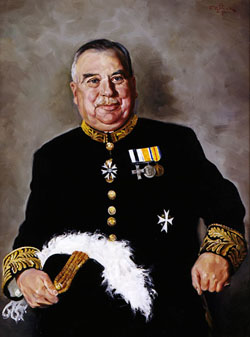
- Frank Mackenzie Ross

19th Lieutenant Governor of British Columbia
- In office October 3, 1955 – October 12, 1960
- Monarch: Elizabeth II
- Governors General: Vincent Massey; Georges Vanier
- Premier: W. A. C. Bennett
- Preceded by: Clarence Wallace
- Succeeded by: George Pearkes

Personal details
- Born: April 19, 1891 Glasgow, Scotland
- Died: December 11, 1971 (aged 80) Vancouver, British Columbia
- Spouse: Phyllis Turner
- Children: 2
- Occupation: Businessman, financier
- Profession: Soldier

Frank Mackenzie Ross CMG MC (April 19, 1891 in Glasgow, Scotland – December 11, 1971 in Vancouver) was the 19th Lieutenant Governor of British Columbia.

Ross was the son of Grace Archibald (McCrone) and David Ross. Ross’ first job was as a bank clerk in Montreal in 1910. He joined the Canadian Expeditionary Force at the outbreak of World War I, serving with the 8th Battalion. During the war, Ross received the Military Cross and was a captain by the war's end.

After the war, Ross joined a shipbuilding company in Saint John, New Brunswick. From this start, Ross went on to careers in industry and finance.

On 3 July 1923 Ross married Gertrude Edith Tomalin, a well-known reciter and entertainer, at the Savoy Chapel. She died in hospital at Saint John, New Brunswick on 22 January 1940, aged 58.

During World War II, Ross assisted in Ottawa procuring supplies for the British Admiralty. His wartime service earned Ross the C.M.G. In 1945, Ross married Phyllis Turner, whose son John Turner later became prime minister of Canada.

Ross was appointed as Lieutenant Governor on October 3, 1955. During Ross’ term, a fire destroyed Government House. A new Government House was completed in May 1959, the year before Ross retired from the office of Lieutenant Governor. With all of the furnishings destroyed, Frank Ross and his wife, Phyllis, went to the United Kingdom in search of suitable pieces. The Rosses purchased 114 pieces of furniture, which they donated to the new Government House.

== Sources ==
- Daniel Francis, ed. (1999). Encyclopedia of British Columbia. Harbour Publishing. ISBN 1-55017-200-X.
- McGregor, D.A. (1967). They Gave Royal Assent – The Lieutenant-Governors of British Columbia. Mitchell Press Limited.
