= Phyllis Ross =

Canadian economist, civil servant, and university leader

Phyllis Ross OC CBE
- Born: Phillis Marie Gregory; 1903; Rossland, British Columbia, Canada
- Died: April 18, 1988 (aged 84–85); Saltspring Island, British Columbia, Canada
- Education: University of British Columbia; Bryn Mawr College
- Spouse(s): Leonard Turner (m. 1928; died 1932) Frank Mackenzie Ross
- Children: 3, including John Turner

Phyllis Marie Gregory Ross, OC, CBE (1903 – April 18, 1988) was a Canadian economist, and civil servant who was the first female chancellor of the University of British Columbia. She was also the mother of the 17th Prime Minister of Canada, John Turner.

== Parentage ==
Though elsewhere listed as Phyllis Gregory, born in Rossland, British Columbia, in 1903, the 1911 census of the Dominion of Canada, shows her as Phillis [sic] Marie Gregory born in British Columbia in June 1894 [sic] aged 6 (meaning that 1894 is probably a census-taker's error for 1904). Her parents were mining company hoist operator, James William 'Jimmy' Gregory (February 22, 1867 – August 15, 1949, Vancouver), of Stellarton, Pictou County, Nova Scotia, of Irish extraction, and his wife Mary Margaret Macdonald (December 18, 1872 – May 10, 1958, Vancouver), of Mulgrave, Guysborough County, Nova Scotia, daughter of a wealthy shipowning sea captain, of Scottish Catholic origins. They arrived in British Columbia in 1896 from their native Nova Scotia, with their elder children, Marcella and Gladys (later Mrs Michael Gillespie). Phyllis's brother, Howard James Gregory's birth is recorded at Rossland in 1898, though her own does not appear in British Columbia's on-line birth indexes for the period.

== Education, family, and career ==
She received a Bachelor's degree in economics and political science with first class honours from the University of British Columbia in 1925. During that year she won the Susan B. Anthony Fellowship and attended Bryn Mawr College, where she received her M.A. in 1927. She also studied at the London School of Economics and the University of Marburg. Together with journalist Leonard Hugh Turner, she had three children, one of whom, Michael, died in infancy. Her husband died of malaria complicated by goitre when she was 29.

Shortly after becoming a widow in Great Depression-era London, England in 1932, impoverished circumstances necessitated her return to Canada. She settled first with her parents in Rossland, and eventually she managed to obtain a position in Ottawa as an economist in the Public Service of Canada. Her education, gifts, and application caused her to rise to hitherto unreached heights for a woman of her generation among the overwhelmingly male mandarin establishment of Ottawa. Her combination of brains and elegance turned the head of bachelor Canadian prime minister, R.B. Bennett, later to become Viscount Bennett, who courted her during her widowhood. But she stayed single.

In Ottawa, she served at the Canadian Tariff Board, the Dominion Trade and Industry Commission, and the Wartime Prices and Trade Board. While still bringing up her two surviving children, John Turner and Brenda Turner (later Mrs Brenda Norris, of Montreal), she eventually attained the most senior position a woman could hold at the time in the Canadian civil service. Even so, because of sexism, she still only received two-thirds of the salary a man in the same post would have received.

In 1945, she married Frank Mackenzie Ross, the Lieutenant-Governor of British Columbia from 1955 to 1960.

== Honours ==
Her contribution to helping the economy of Canada during World War II was recognized by the Government of Canada when she was made a Commander of the Order of the British Empire, a rare recommendation for an imperial honour during the prime ministership of William Lyon Mackenzie King, whose Liberal ministry believed in the sparing use of British honours for Canadians in an age before Canada adopted its own separate Canadian honours system.

Over her career, and especially when she returned to her native province, she remained involved with the University of British Columbia (UBC). She was a member of the UBC Senate from 1951 to 1954 and again from 1960 to 1966. In 1957, she was appointed to the Board of Governors. In 1961, she was honoured by her alma mater for her dual role as an accomplished Canadian economist and former provincial vicereine in being elected the University's first female chancellor.

In 1967, she was awarded the Medal of Service of the Order of Canada, later converted to appointment as an Officer of the Order of Canada, for "her contributions as a public servant". She was also a Dame of St John of Jerusalem and, as a Roman Catholic laywoman, also a Dame of the Sovereign Military Order of Malta.

== Death ==
Ross was diagnosed with Alzheimer's disease. She died in her sleep on Saltspring Island in 1988.

Academic offices
Preceded by Albert E. Grauer	Chancellor of the University of British Columbia; 1961–1966	Succeeded by John Murdoch Buchanan
