= Saskatchewan Pension Plan =

Canadian provincial voluntary plan

The Saskatchewan Pension Plan (SPP) is a voluntary defined contribution pension plan created by the government of Saskatchewan in the province of Saskatchewan, Canada. The SPP was created through The Saskatchewan Pension Plan Act. Oversight of the plan rests with the Saskatchewan Pension Plan Board of Trustees. The plan is also open to both residents (over the age of 18) of Saskatchewan and other provinces. Saskatchewan is the only province in Canada that operates a voluntary pension plan of this nature. The plan has assets of $700 million and over 32,000 members. The maximum annual individual contribution is $7,000, indexed annually according to the change in the Year's Maximum Pensionable Earnings.

== History ==
Over the last several years, the amount of money that a person can contribute annually to the Saskatchewan Pension Plan has grown from $600, to $2,500, and now to $7,000. This means participants have the ability to save a substantial amount of money in a retirement plan which delivers a real pension is now possible. Additionally, the SPP allows its members to transfer up to $10,000 per year from their RRSP investments to the plan. This means that total contributions can easily amount to $7,000 + $10,000 = $17,000 annually, which is a beneficial strategy for anyone wanting to contribute more than the $7,000 annual limit. Through the power of compound interest substantial growth can be experienced over the years on these contributions.

== Locked-in provision ==
Money invested in the SPP is locked-in until retirement, which means it cannot be withdrawn except as stipulated in the Regulations of the plan. There are specific provisions for the division of monies invested during marital breakdown. Additionally, the Member Handbook declares that, "the only way SPP funds can be claimed or seized is following an order under The Enforcement of Maintenance Orders Act, 1997." Thus, money invested in SPP is by definition a long-term investment and is offered some protections from seizure. This can be very advantageous to people trying to save for retirement as their money is safe both from them spending it (because it is locked-in) and some legal protections keep other people from getting at it. A final important point is that money invested in an SPP account grows tax exempt because it has the same tax status as a Registered Retirement Savings Plan (RRSP).

== Investing ==
The SPP offers two funds, the Balanced Fund (BF) and Diversified Income Fund (DIF) formerly Short-term fund. The BF is targeted for long-term growth of capital and has medium volatility, while the DIF provides a low risk option that offers income from diversified sources. Members are able to set an allocation of their investments between these two funds to match their risk tolerance and other investment goals. The low management expense ratio (MER) of the SPP means your money enjoys better long term growth. The MER on the BF has a historical range of 0.79%–1.24%. Moreover, the average annual rate of return (earnings) on the BF fund since inception has been 8.10%.

== Retirement ==
Planning for retirement is faced by all Canadians, and is most effective when it involves a well developed strategy with a variety of content to balance risk. Like any locked-in RRSP, the SPP can help bridge the gap between Old Age Security, the Canada Pension Plan, TFSAs, personal savings, and an employer pension plan to offer additional financial security during retirement. While the SPP is unusual in being managed by a government rather than a private financial services company, it offers generally the same options at retirement as the others, though before retirement its locked in nature (no ability under normal circumstances to withdraw any funds before age 55) can be either a positive or negative depending on the user's circumstances. The retirement options available to SPP members are covered on the SPP website.
