= 1972 Canadian federal budget =

1972 Budget of the Canadian Federal Government
- Presented: 8 May 1972
- Country: Canada
- Parliament: 28th
- Party: Liberal
- Finance minister: John Turner
- Total revenue: 19.808 billion
- Total expenditures: 21.709 billion
- Deficit: $1.901 billion

The 1972 Canadian federal budget for fiscal year 1972–73 was presented by Minister of Finance John N. Turner in the House of Commons of Canada on 8 May 1972. It was the last budget before the 1972 Canadian federal election, and included tax cuts for corporations, and aid for the elderly and post-secondary students.
