= 1976 Canadian federal budget =

1976 Budget of the Canadian Federal Government
- Presented: 25 May 1976
- Country: Canada
- Parliament: 30th
- Party: Liberal
- Finance minister: Donald Stovel Macdonald
- Total revenue: 35.283 billion
- Total expenditures: 42.180 billion
- Deficit: $6.897 billion

The Canadian federal budget for fiscal year 1976–77 was presented by Minister of Finance Donald Stovel Macdonald in the House of Commons of Canada on 25 May 1976.

== Background ==
=== December 1975 Ministerial Statement ===
On 18 December 1975 Donald Macdonald announced a temporary 10% surtax on taxes above $8,000. The surtax only applied to the 1976 taxation year and was enacted on 24 February 1977.

== Taxes ==
=== Personal income taxes ===
The budget announced that taxpayers will be able to transfer their RHOSP savings from one plan to another, for instance to select a plan with a better rate of return.

The maximum deduction for RPPs is increased to $3,500. For RRSPs the limit is increased to $5,500 per year.

Maximum deduction for child care expenses is increased to $1,000 by child (from $500) and capped to $4,000 by family (increased from $2,000).
