= 1975 Canadian federal budget =

1975 Budget of the Canadian Federal Government
- Presented: 23 June 1975
- Country: Canada
- Parliament: 30th
- Party: Liberal
- Finance minister: John Turner
- Total revenue: 32.441 billion
- Total expenditures: 38.645 billion
- Deficit: $6.204 billion

The Canadian federal budget for fiscal year 1975–76 was presented by Minister of Finance John Turner in the House of Commons of Canada on 23 June 1975.
