= 1973 Canadian federal budget =

Canadian federal budget for fiscal year 1973-1974

1973 Budget of the Canadian Federal Government
- Presented: 19 February 1973
- Country: Canada
- Parliament: 29th
- Party: Liberal
- Finance minister: John Turner
- Total revenue: 22.997 billion
- Total expenditures: 25.208 billion
- Deficit: $2.211 billion

The Canadian federal budget for fiscal year 1973–74 was presented by Minister of Finance John Turner in the House of Commons of Canada on 19 February 1973.
