= First home savings account =

Canadian financial account for first-time homeowners

A first home savings account (FHSA, French: Compte d'épargne libre d'impôt pour l'achat d'une première propriété, CELIAPP) is a financial account offered in Canada since 2023, intended to help first-time homeowners afford a down payment. It has an annual contribution limit of CA$8,000, up to a total limit of $40,000. Money placed in the account is tax-deductible, comparable to a registered retirement savings plan (RRSP). Money earned in the account through investments is also tax-free, comparable to a tax-free savings account (TFSA). If the money in the account is not used to buy a home within fifteen years, the funds must either be transferred to an RRSP or withdrawn.

== Background ==
A previous federal program for first-time homeowners in Canada was the first-time homebuyer incentive, which was offered from 2019 to 2024. The government would provide a loan of up to ten percent on a property that would need to be repaid within 25 years and was a shared equity program with household income thresholds. It was criticized as a "convoluted program that was poorly thought out". The introduction of the first home savings account was received more favourably.

Another federal program used to incentivize first-time homeownership is the home buyers' plan, which allows for a $60,000 CAD withdrawal from an RRSP without financial penalties. The withdrawn funds must be replaced within fifteen years. The home buyer's plan can be used in conjunction with the first home savings account.

== Eligibility ==
To open a first home savings account, one must be a Canadian adult that is between the ages of 18 and 71. The Government of Canada has a specific definition of a "first time homebuyer". While a first home savings account cannot be used to buy a second home, people who have previously jointly owned property may qualify under certain circumstances. Couples can have their own individual first home savings accounts and use the combined total in these accounts when buying a home.

== History ==
While the first home savings account was officially available on April 1, 2023, no major Canadian financial institution offered these accounts upon its release. All Big Six banks eventually made these accounts available to their customers by November 2023. The Canada Revenue Agency had technical issues processing 2023 tax returns in which individuals held a first home savings account.

== See also ==
- Registered home ownership savings plan (RHOSP), a short-lived historical account with most of the same attributes.
