= Capital account (financial accounting) =

Business bookkeeping structure

In financial accounting, the capital account is one of the accounts in shareholders' equity. Sole proprietorships have a single capital account in the owner's equity. Partnerships maintain a capital account for each of the partners.

== See also ==
- Capital account (macroeconomics)
