= Locked-in retirement account =

Canadian investment account for former registered pension plan funds

A locked-in retirement account (LIRA, French: compte de retraite immobilisé (CRI)) or locked-in retirement savings plan (LRSP) is a Canadian investment account designed specifically to hold locked-in pension funds for former registered pension plan (RPP) members, former spouses or common-law partners, or surviving spouses or partners.

Funds held inside LIRAs / LRSPs normally only become available (or "unlocked") to holders upon retirement or upon conversion to another style of pension instrument (e.g. LIF, RLIF, annuity).

== Meaning of Locked-In ==
The distinction between a LIRA / LRSP and a registered retirement savings plan (RRSP) is that, where RRSPs can be cashed in at any time, a LIRA / LRSP cannot. Instead, the investment held in the LIRA / LRSP is "locked-in" and cannot be removed until either retirement or a specified age outlined in the applicable pension legislation (though certain exceptions exist). Another important distinction between regular RRSPs and LIRAs / LRSPs is that once funds have been transferred from a company pension plan to a LIRA / LRSP, further contributions cannot be made into said LIRA / LRSP. Any monetary amounts earned in the LIRA / LRSP through investment are also considered to be locked-in.

== Provisions for holding a LIRA / LRSP ==
Employees who have Registered Pension Plans (RPP) and who remain with their company until retirement age will receive income for life at time of retirement. However, at the time of termination of membership in a company pension plan preceding retirement, death before retirement (whereby funds become property of surviving spouse or partner), or the breakup of marriage or common-law relationship, holders can transfer their RPP funds into a LIRA / LRSP and hold them there until retirement.

== Converting a LIRA / LRSP to a registered income fund or life annuity ==
In order to withdraw retirement income, holders need to convert their LIRAs / LRSPs into life income funds (LIF), or federally regulated restricted locked-in income funds (RLIFs), as these allow for periodic withdrawal of pension income during retirement. Instead of converting to a LIF / RLIF, holders may opt to use the proceeds of their LIRA / LRSP to purchase a life annuity from an insurance company. In the past, there was a requirement to convert LIF/RLIFs to an annuity at a specific age. This is no longer in effect for LIF/RLIFs under federal jurisdiction.

Variations exist between jurisdictions as to the holder's minimum age when plan conversion is allowed and the maximum age for mandatory plan conversion. Under Saskatchewan legislation, LIFs / RLIFs are no longer permitted since 2002 and LIRA there are now transferred to prescribed retirement income funds (PRIF). Manitoba also offers a PRIF alternative. Newfoundland and Labrador offers a locked-in retirement income fund (LRIF), though other provinces also did in the past, which is available starting at age 55 and never needs to be converted to an annuity.

== Pension legislation differences ==
LIRAs / LRSPs are registered provincially / federally at the time of transfer from the company pension plan to the LIRA / LRSP. Though some LIF accounts are registered federally (RLIFs), the bulk of locked-in accounts are registered under the legislation of a specific province. The primary differences which exist from province to province involve the minimum age required for withdrawal (i.e. when conversion to LIFs / RLIFs / LRIFs / PRIFs is possible), the special provisions by which locked-in funds may be unlocked early, and the maximum amounts that may be withdrawn each year.

For example, the Saskatchewan and Manitoba prescribed retirement income funds (PRIFs) have no maximum limit on withdrawals per year. The Newfoundland and Labrador locked-in retirement income fund (LRIF) has more generous maximum withdrawal limits per year than for a corresponding LIF.

== Difference between LIRAs and LRSPs ==
LIRAs and LRSPs are essentially identical in structure and serve identical purposes. LIRA refers to a provincially regulated locked-in retirement account, while LRSP refers to a federally regulated locked-in retirement savings plan.
