= November 1978 Canadian federal budget =

Jean Chrétien's second national spending plan as Finance Minister

November 1978 Budget of the Canadian Federal Government
- Presented: 16 November 1978
- Country: Canada
- Parliament: 30th
- Party: Liberal
- Finance minister: Jean Chrétien
- Total revenue: 43.310 billion
- Total expenditures: 55.277 billion
- Deficit: $11.967 billion

The Canadian federal budget for fiscal year 1979–80 was presented by Minister of Finance Jean Chrétien in the House of Commons of Canada on 16 November 1978.

== Context ==
=== August 1978 spending cuts ===
The budget follows the announcement by Prime Minister Pierre Trudeau of a $2-billion spending cuts package on 1 August 1978. Details for $1.5-billion of the cuts were released on 16 August 1978 and affected more than 100 federal programs and many organisms including the Department of National Defence ($150-million), the CBC ($71-million), the Canadian International Development Agency ($133-million) and many other federal institutions. Construction of a heavy water plant in La Prade (Quebec) was immediately suspended to generate $150-million in savings.

== Aftermath ==
=== Execution ===
Budgetary items in billions of dollars
Element	1977–1978	1978-1979		
Element	Actual	April Budget	Nov. Budget	Actual
Tax revenues	28.96	31.62	30.73	30.65
Non-tax revenues	3.91	4.39	4.47	4.56
Program expenditures	(37.35)	(46.90)	(47.30)	(39.86)
Public debt charge	(5.55)	(46.90)	(47.30)	(7.06)
Extraordinary items (Note: A provision was made in the 1978-1979 public accounts for the valuation of certain assets and liabilities, notably loans to other government entities and revolving funds.)	–	–	–	(4.48)
Deficit	(10.04)	(10.90)	(12.10)	(16.19)
Non-budgetary transactions	1.77	(0.60)	–	5.25
Financial requirements	(8.27)	(11.50)	(12.10)	(10.94)

== Notes and references ==
=== References ===
==== Budget documents ====
- Budget Speech (PDF). Ottawa. 16 November 1978.
- Budget Papers: Notices of Ways and Means Motions and supplementary information on the Budget (PDF). Ottawa. 16 November 1978.
- Budget in brief (PDF). Ottawa. 16 November 1978.
