= November 1974 Canadian federal budget =

November 1974 Budget of the Canadian Federal Government
- Presented: 18 November 1974
- Country: Canada
- Parliament: 30th
- Party: Liberal
- Finance minister: John Turner
- Total revenue: 29.965 billion
- Total expenditures: 32.190 billion
- Deficit: $2.225 billion

The Canadian federal budget for fiscal year 1974–75 was presented by Minister of Finance John Turner in the House of Commons of Canada on 18 November 1974. This was the first federal budget following the 1974 Canadian federal election, which saw the liberals go from a minority to a majority government.

One of the most controversial provision of the budget was the end of the deduction of provincial natural resources royalties from federal tax. According to Roy Romanow, this move kicked off the "resource war", a confrontation between Pierre Trudeau's federal government and the prairie Provinces over the control and revenues from natural resources extraction and energy production.

The budget re-affirmed the creation of the Registered Home Ownership Savings Plan.

== See also ==
- Canadian federal budget
- Western alienation
