= May 1974 Canadian federal budget =

May 1974 Budget of the Canadian Federal Government
- Presented: 6 May 1974
- Country: Canada
- Parliament: 29th
- Party: Liberal
- Finance minister: John Turner

The May 1974 Canadian federal budget was presented by Minister of Finance John Turner in the House of Commons of Canada on 6 May 1974. It was meant to serve as the federal budget for fiscal year 1974–75, but it was never implemented as the government was defeated in a vote of confidence before it was adopted. The NDP, which had been propping up Pierre Trudeau’s minority government for the past two years, withdrew their support because they were displeased with the content of this budget. This led to the 1974 Canadian federal election, in which Trudeau's Liberal Party won with a majority of the seats.

The budget saw the inception of the Registered Home Ownership Savings Plan.
