= April 1978 Canadian federal budget =

Jean Chrétien's first national spending plan as Finance Minister

April 1978 Budget of the Canadian Federal Government
- Presented: 10 April 1978
- Country: Canada
- Parliament: 30th
- Party: Liberal
- Finance minister: Jean Chrétien
- Total revenue: 38.214 billion
- Total expenditures: 51.243 billion
- Deficit: $13.029 billion

The Canadian federal budget for fiscal year 1978–79 presented by Minister of Finance Jean Chrétien in the House of Commons of Canada on 10 April 1978. It is the fifth budget of the 30th Parliament and the first presented by Jean Chrétien.

== Taxes ==
=== Personal income taxes ===
The most important element of the budget is retirement savings reform. Prior to the budget, RRSP owners who turned 71 were forced to either:

- Invest the proceeds for the RRSP plan in a life annuity;
- Have the proceeds withdrawn in a lump-sum and included in the taxpayer's taxable income.

Starting on the day of the budget speech, two additional options were provided:

- RRSP could be rolled over tax free in a Registered Retirement Income Fund (RRIF) a newly created investment vehicle with minimum yearly withdrawals to take until age 90.
- Fixed-term annuity up to age 90 could be acquired instead of life annuities.

The conversion of the RRSP into annuities or RRIF must occur between ages 60 and 70 (included).

Other less substantial changes to personal income tax rules were enacted as part of the budget:

- Lodging and board provided by employers on remote work sites were made non taxable for all taxpayers; (Note: Prior to the budget the value of lodging or board provided by the employer was included in the taxpayer's income although an equivalent deduction was provided only to married taxpayers.)
- Tax-free rollover provisions are extended to incorporated family farms.

=== Corporate income taxes ===
The budget contained a series of technical changes and improved support for R&D expenditures:

- A 10-year special allowance of 50% is provided for increased R&D expenditures. (Note: The budget speech specifies that the special allowance is made available for the amount by which a company's R&D expenditures in a year exceed the company's average R&D expenditures over the previous three-year period.) This measure is estimated to cost $50 million in federal revenues;
- Increased tax incentives were provided to promote energy production;
- Faster depreciation (through increased capital cost allowance rates) are made available to railway companies for equipment acquired between 10 April 1978 and 1982.

=== Sales taxes ===
The most notorious measure of the April 1978 budget is the temporary reduction of retail sales taxes aimed at stimulating the economy. The federal government made a first proposal to provincial governments in 1977 by offering a 50% compensation for a 2%-cut in provincial retail sales tax rates. The proposal was rejected by the provinces. An enhanced proposal is made in the budget:

- A six-month 2%-cut financed by the federal government that must be simultaneously matched by a 1%-cut financed by provincial treasuries;
- A six-month 2%-cut financed by Ottawa that must be followed by a three-month 2%-cut integrally financed by the provinces;
- For Atlantic provinces, Ottawa agreed to finance integrally a six-month 3%-cut.

Ontario and Manitoba opted for the first option (six-month 3% cut with a 2/3 compensation from the federal government) while British Columbia and Saskatchewan opted for the second. At the time of the budget speech, the Quebec government had not officially answered to the federal proposal.

Two days after the budget speech, the Premier of Quebec René Lévesque vehemently rejected the federal offer during question period in the Quebec National Assembly.

== Aftermath ==
=== Execution ===
Budgetary items in billions of dollars
Element	1977-1978	1978-1979	
Element	Actual	Budget	Actual
Tax revenues	28.96	31.62	30.65
Non-tax revenues	3.91	4.39	4.56
Program expenditures	(37.35)	(46.90)	(39.86)
Public debt charge	(5.55)	(46.90)	(7.06)
Extraordinary items (Note: A provision was made in the 1978-1979 public accounts for the valuation of certain assets and liabilities, notably loans to other government entities and revolving funds.)	–	–	(4.48)
Deficit	(10.04)	(10.90)	(16.19)
Non-budgetary transactions	1.77	(0.60)	5.25
Financial requirements	(8.27)	(11.50)	(10.94)

== Notes and references ==
=== References ===
==== Budget documents ====
- The budget (PDF). Ottawa. 10 April 1978.
- Budget in brief (PDF). Ottawa. 10 April 1978.
