= John Turner =

Prime Minister of Canada in 1984

The Right Honourable John Turner PC CC QC
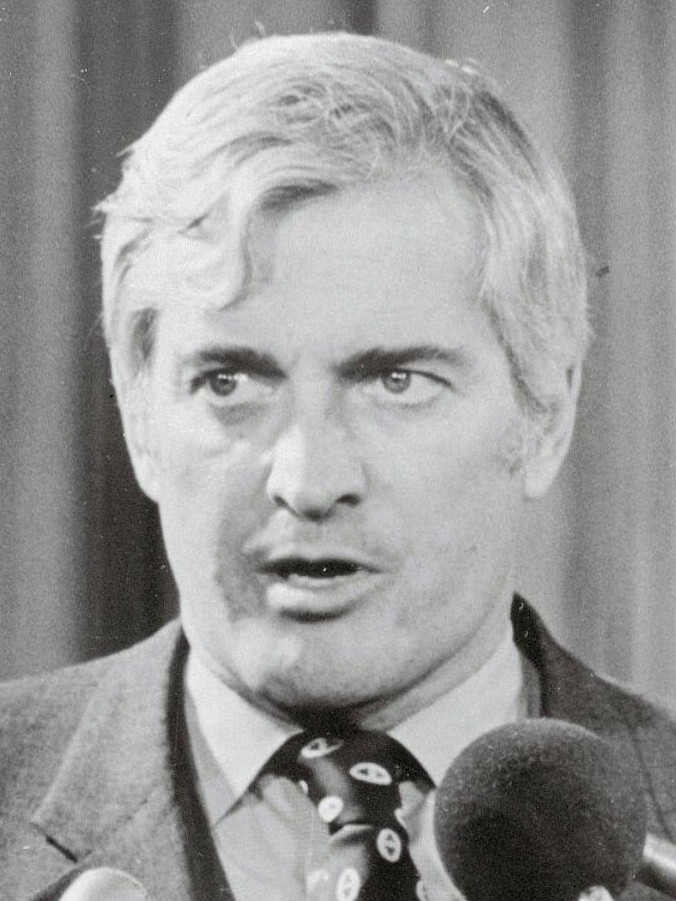
- Turner in 1975

17th Prime Minister of Canada
- In office June 30 – September 17, 1984
- Monarch: Elizabeth II
- Governor General: Jeanne Sauvé
- Deputy: Jean Chrétien
- Preceded by: Pierre Trudeau
- Succeeded by: Brian Mulroney
Senior political offices
Leader of the Opposition
In office September 17, 1984 – February 7, 1990
Preceded by	Brian Mulroney
Succeeded by	Herb Gray
Leader of the Liberal Party
In office June 16, 1984 – June 23, 1990
Preceded by	Pierre Trudeau
Succeeded by	Jean Chrétien
Ministerial positions
Minister of Finance
In office January 28, 1972 – September 10, 1975
Prime Minister	Pierre Trudeau
Preceded by	Edgar Benson
Succeeded by	Donald Stovel Macdonald
Minister of Justice Attorney General of Canada
In office July 6, 1968 – January 28, 1972
Prime Minister	Pierre Trudeau
Preceded by	Pierre Trudeau
Succeeded by	Otto Lang
Solicitor General of Canada
In office April 20 – July 5, 1968
Prime Minister	Pierre Trudeau
Preceded by	Lawrence Pennell
Succeeded by	George McIlraith
Minister of Consumer and Corporate Affairs; Registrar General of Canada
In office December 21, 1967 – July 5, 1968
Prime Minister	Lester B. Pearson; Pierre Trudeau
Preceded by	Guy Favreau
Succeeded by	George McIlraith

Member of Parliament
- In office September 4, 1984 – October 25, 1993
- Preceded by: Bill Clarke
- Succeeded by: Ted McWhinney
- Constituency: Vancouver Quadra
- In office June 18, 1962 – February 12, 1976
- Preceded by: Egan Chambers
- Succeeded by: Jean Pigott
- Constituency: St. Lawrence—St. George (1962–1968); Ottawa—Carleton (1968–1976)

Personal details
- Born: John Napier Wyndham Turner; June 7, 1929 Richmond, Surrey, England
- Died: September 19, 2020 (aged 91) Toronto, Ontario, Canada
- Resting place: Mount Pleasant Cemetery, Toronto
- Citizenship: Canada (by descent); United Kingdom (by birth)
- Party: Liberal
- Spouse: Geills Kilgour (m. 1963)
- Children: 4
- Parent: Phyllis Ross (mother)
- Education: University of British Columbia (BA); Magdalen College, Oxford (BA, BCL, MA); University of Paris (no degree)
- Occupation: Politician; lawyer

John Napier Wyndham Turner (June 7, 1929 – September 19, 2020) was the 17th prime minister of Canada, serving from June to September 1984. He served as leader of the Liberal Party and leader of the Opposition from 1984 to 1990.

Turner practised law before being elected as a member of Parliament (MP) in the 1962 federal election. He served in the cabinet of Prime Minister Pierre Trudeau as minister of justice and attorney general from 1968 to 1972 and then as minister of finance from 1972 to 1975. As a cabinet minister, Turner came to be known as a leader of the Business Liberal faction of the Liberal Party. Amid a global recession and the prospect of having to implement unpopular wage and price controls, Turner resigned from his position in 1975.

From 1976 to 1984, Turner took a hiatus from politics, working as a corporate lawyer on Bay Street. Trudeau's resignation in 1984 triggered a leadership election, which Turner successfully contested. When he was sworn in as prime minister, Turner was not an MP or senator—a situation that would not recur until Mark Carney became prime minister in 2025. Turner held the office of prime minister for just 79 days. He advised the governor general to dissolve Parliament soon after being sworn in. He went on to lose the 1984 election in a landslide to Brian Mulroney's Progressive Conservatives, leading the Liberals to the second-worst defeat for a governing party at the federal level (in terms of proportion of seats). Re-entering Parliament as the member for Vancouver Quadra, Turner stayed on as Liberal leader and led the Opposition for the next six years.

In the 1988 election, Turner vigorously campaigned against Mulroney's proposed free trade agreement with the United States and led the Liberals to a modest recovery. He resigned as party leader in 1990 and did not seek re-election as an MP in 1993.

Turner was Canada's first prime minister born in the United Kingdom since Mackenzie Bowell in 1896, Canada's second shortest-serving prime minister behind Charles Tupper, and Canada's fifth longest-lived prime minister, living to the age of 91. (Note: Charles Tupper was the longest-lived Canadian prime minister, living to the age of 94 years, 120 days, Mackenzie Bowell lived to the age of 93 years, 348 days, Jean Chrétien is currently living at the age of 92 years, 313 days, Louis St. Laurent lived to the age of 91 years, 174 days. Turner lived to the age of 91 years, 104 days.)

== Early life ==
Turner was born on June 7, 1929, in Richmond, Surrey, England (now a part of London), to Leonard Hugh Turner, an English journalist with The Manchester Guardian, and Phyllis Gregory, a Canadian economist. He had a brother, Michael, born in 1930 (who died shortly after birth), and a sister, Brenda, born in 1931. When Turner's father died in 1932, he and his sister moved to Canada with their Canadian-born mother. The family settled in her childhood home in Rossland, British Columbia, and later moved to Ottawa.

Turner's mother was loving but demanding of her two children. The family was not wealthy. His mother remarried in 1945 to Frank Mackenzie Ross, who later served as Lieutenant Governor of British Columbia, and the family relocated to Vancouver.

=== Education ===
Turner was educated at Ashbury College and St. Patrick's College, Ottawa (senior matriculation). He enrolled at the University of British Columbia (UBC) in 1945, at age 16. He was a member of the UBC chapter of the Beta Theta Pi fraternity, and was among Canada's outstanding track sprinters in the late 1940s. He held the Canadian record for the men's 100-yard dash and qualified for the 1948 London Olympics, but a bad knee kept him from competing. He graduated from UBC with a BA (Honours) in 1949.

Awarded a Rhodes Scholarship, Turner went on to Magdalen College at the University of Oxford, where he earned a BA in jurisprudence in 1951 and a BCL in 1952; his BA was promoted to a MA in 1957, as was customary. He was on the track and field team at Oxford. One of his teammates was Roger Bannister, who became the first runner to break the four-minute barrier in the mile. At Oxford, Turner was a classmate and friend of future Australian prime ministers Malcolm Fraser and Bob Hawke, as well as Jeremy Thorpe, future leader of Britain's Liberal Party. He also pursued doctoral studies at the University of Paris from 1952 to 1953.

=== Relationship with Princess Margaret ===
On July 25, 1958, a ball was hosted by Turner's mother and stepfather (in the latter's role as lieutenant governor of British Columbia) in honour of Princess Margaret at HMCS Discovery, the Royal Canadian Navy's reserve station in Vancouver. Turner danced with Princess Margaret, who was one year his junior, and they sat and talked, declining requests to return to supper. This was the first time that Turner received significant press attention in Canada. Further meetings between them during Margaret's three-week official visit to Canada led to considerable speculation about whether the two would become a serious couple. Contemporary press reports suggested there was some consternation about the reports among British officials, but their Canadian counterparts were more relaxed.

A year later, in September 1959, press attention returned when reports circulated that Turner had been a guest at Balmoral in August, where discussions had taken place concerning marriage between the pair; that he had also paid a secret visit to see her in April; and that his parents had commented on their close friendship during their visit to Scotland in August.

According to letters written by Margaret to her friend Sharman Douglas, discovered in 2015 and obtained by the Daily Mail, the relationship was more serious than previously thought. In one letter, written seven years later, the princess wrote: "John Turner is here & we meet on Thursday. It will seem so funny as we haven't met since I nearly married him & he's bringing his wife!" Turner told the Daily Mail: "I have never talked about it, and I am not going to start talking about it now." Brenda confirmed a "very definite attraction" between her brother and the princess, but said that Turner was uninterested in royalty and would not have given up Catholicism.

It has been claimed that Turner attended Margaret's party at Balmoral Castle in August 1959, where his roommate was Margaret's future husband Antony Armstrong-Jones; however, according to his authorized biography, Armstrong-Jones visited Balmoral for the first time in early October 1959. Turner was the only Canadian unofficial guest at their wedding in May 1960. Turner remained friends with Margaret; he and his wife often met the princess in Britain or during official visits to Canada. They attended Margaret's 2002 private funeral and were Canada's official representatives at the memorial service.

=== Marriage and family ===
Turner was married on May 11, 1963, to Geills McCrae Kilgour (b. 1937), who was then a systems engineer with IBM, and the great-niece of Canadian Army doctor John McCrae, the author of what is probably the best-known First World War poem, "In Flanders Fields", and the sister of David Kilgour, a long-time Canadian Member of Parliament. The Turners had a daughter named Elizabeth and three sons: Michael, David, and Andrew. David died in 2021. The Turner children attended Rockcliffe Park Public School, in Ottawa. All three sons attended Upper Canada College, in Toronto.

== Early career ==
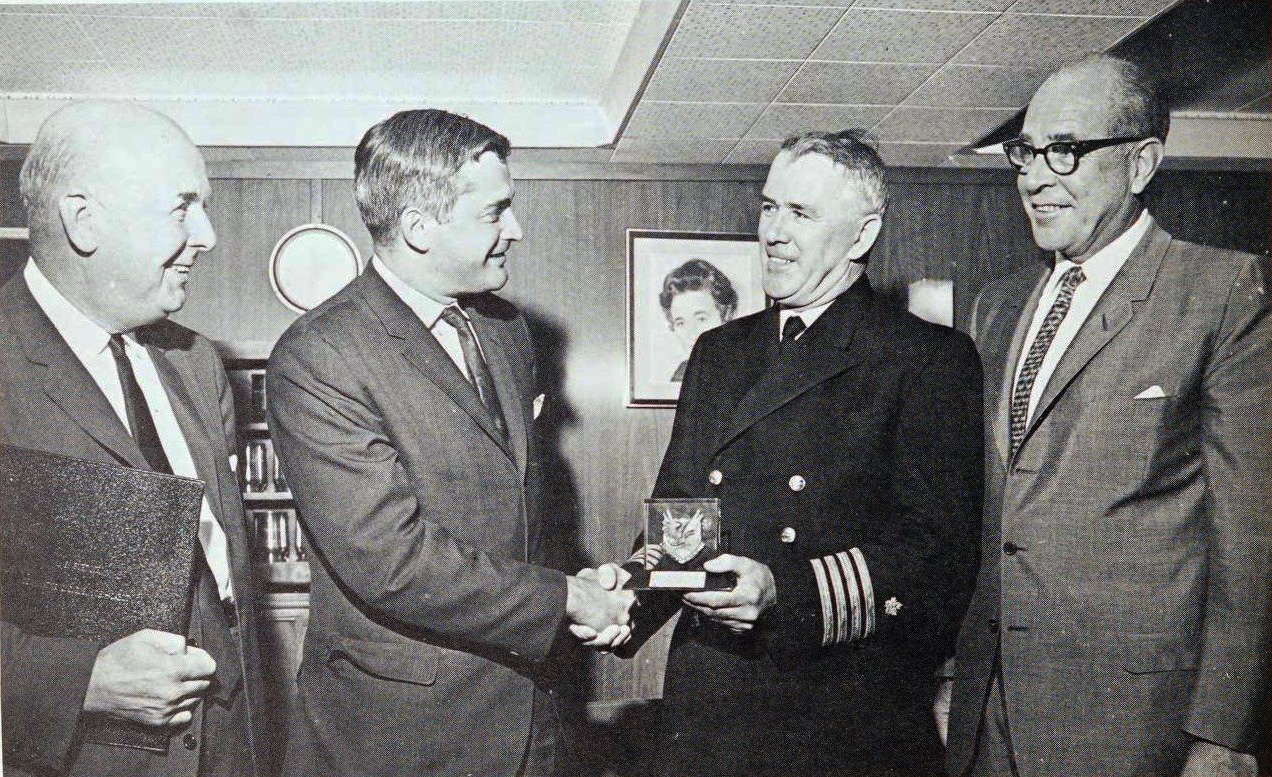
Turner presents Captain Burdock with the NORAD Shield of Freedom award on CCGS John Cabot while it was docked at the Port of Montreal

Turner practised law, initially with the firm of Stikeman Elliott in Montreal, Quebec. He was elected as a member of Parliament for St. Lawrence—St. George in 1962 and was re-elected there in every election until the riding's dissolution in 1968. He was the member of Parliament for Ottawa—Carleton from 1968 to 1976.

In 1965, while vacationing in Barbados, Turner noticed that former prime minister and Leader of the Opposition John Diefenbaker, staying at the same hotel, was struggling in the strong surf and undertow. Turner, a competitive swimmer while in university, jumped in and pulled Diefenbaker to shore.

== Cabinet minister ==
Turner held cabinet positions during the 1960s and 1970s under prime ministers Lester Pearson and Pierre Trudeau.

=== Premiership of Lester Pearson ===
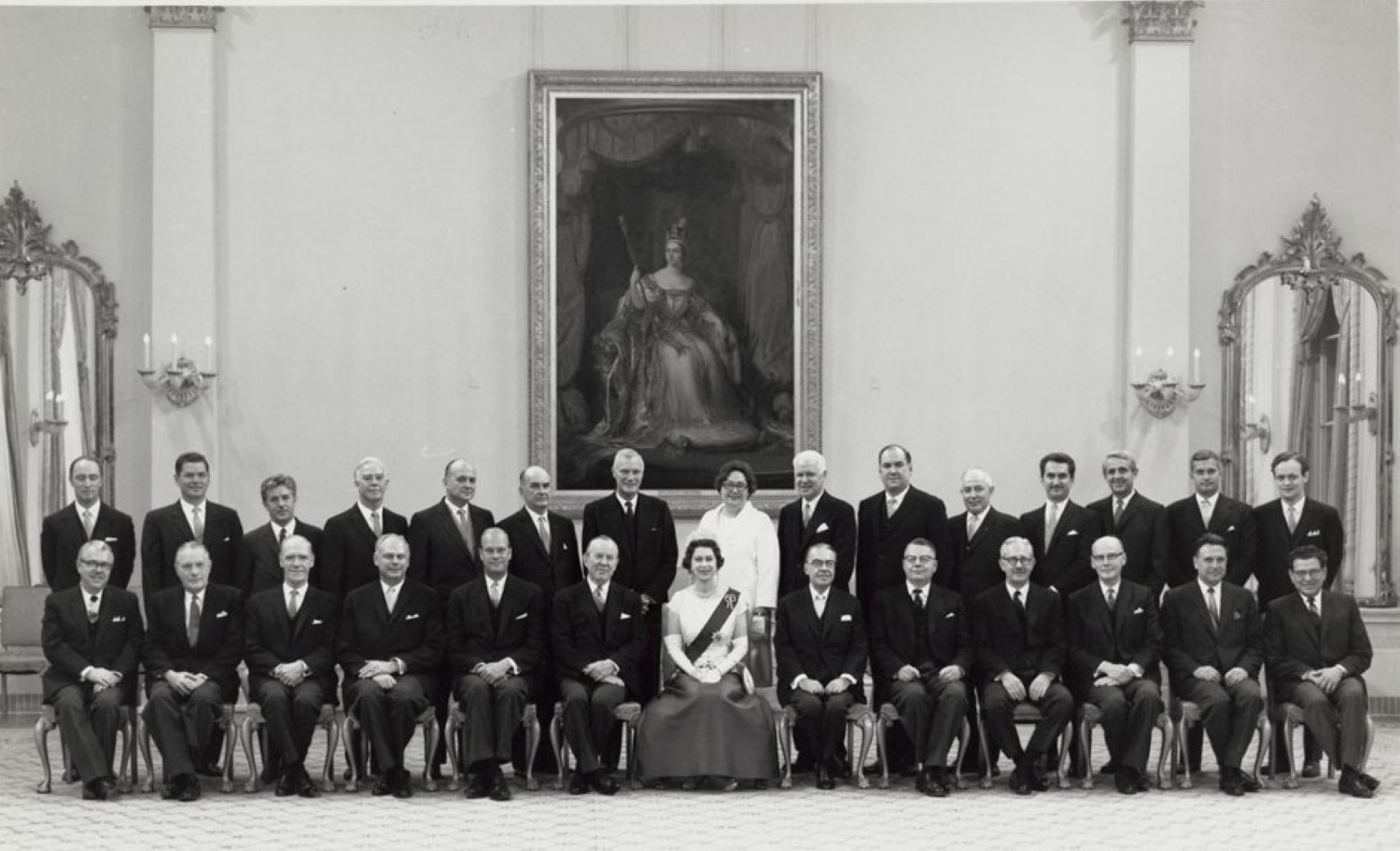
Her Majesty Queen Elizabeth II and her Canadian ministers at Rideau Hall for Canada Day, July 1, 1967

Turner served in the Cabinet of Prime Minister Lester Pearson in various capacities, most notably as Minister of Consumer and Corporate Affairs. When Pearson retired, Turner ran to succeed him at the 1968 leadership convention. Turner, the youngest of the dozen leadership candidates at age 38, stated, "My time is now," and remarked during his speech that he was "not here for some vague, future convention in, say, 1984". Turner stayed on until the fourth and final ballot, finishing third behind Pierre Trudeau and runner-up Robert Winters.

=== Premiership of Pierre Trudeau ===
Turner served in Trudeau's cabinet as minister of justice for four years. Biographer Paul Litt argues that Turner was a hard-working, well-informed minister whose success was assured by his warm relationship with his peers. His achievements, according to Litt, included strengthening the rights of individual defendants on trial, greater efficiency in the justice system, creation of the influential Law Reform Commission, selecting highly professional judges, and bringing a policy perspective to the Justice Department. He led the government's position in the highly controversial Official Languages Act, and he took control during the October Crisis in 1970.

A member of the Business Liberal faction of the Liberal Party, Turner then served as minister of finance from 1972 until 1975. He faced economic challenges, including the 1973 oil crisis, the collapse of the postwar Bretton Woods trading system, slowing economic growth combined with soaring inflation (stagflation), and growing deficits. His positions were more conservative than Trudeau's, and the two grew apart. In 1975, Turner unexpectedly resigned from cabinet. The Liberals had won the 1974 election by attacking Robert Stanfield's Progressive Conservatives over their platform involving wage and price controls. However, Trudeau decided to implement the wage and price controls in late 1975. In a 2013 interview with Catherine Clark on CPAC, Turner confirmed his resignation from cabinet was a direct result of refusing to implement wage and price controls, after campaigning against them in 1974.

In his memoirs, Trudeau wrote that Turner said he resigned as Finance Minister in 1975 because he was tired of politics after 13 years in Ottawa and wanted to take a better-paying job as a lawyer in Toronto to support his family and spend more time with them as his children grew up. Trudeau also suggested that Turner's years as finance minister were very difficult because of turbulent and unusual conditions in the world economy, characterized as stagflation, largely caused by enormous increases in the price of oil.

==== Federal budgets presented as minister of finance ====
- 1973 Canadian federal budget
- May 1974 Canadian federal budget
- November 1974 Canadian federal budget
- 1975 Canadian federal budget

== Bay Street ==
From 1975 to 1984, Turner worked as a corporate lawyer at the Bay Street law firm McMillan Binch. When Pierre Trudeau resigned as Liberal leader in 1979 following a defeat in the election, Turner announced that he would not be a candidate for the Liberal leadership. Trudeau was persuaded to rescind his resignation after the government of Joe Clark was defeated by a motion of no confidence, and returned to contest and win the 1980 federal election. Trudeau then served as prime minister until 1984.

== Prime Minister (June–September 1984) ==
Trudeau retired after polls showed the Liberals faced certain defeat in the next election if he remained in office. Turner then re-entered politics and defeated Jean Chrétien, his successor as finance minister, on the second ballot of the June 1984 Liberal leadership convention. He was formally appointed prime minister on June 30. When he was sworn in, Turner was not an MP or senator; the next prime minister to assume office without a seat in either chamber would be Mark Carney in 2025. He also announced that he would not seek a seat in the Commons through a by-election but would instead run in the next general election as the Liberal candidate in the British Columbia riding of Vancouver Quadra, a seat held by the Tories. This was part of Turner's strategy to rebuild the Liberals' image in western Canada; at the time, the party held no seats west of Winnipeg.

In his final days of office, Trudeau recommended that Governor General Jeanne Sauvé appoint over 200 Liberals to patronage positions, including senators, judges, and executives on various governmental and crown corporation boards. Turner then made a further 19 appointments himself, as Trudeau had required as a condition of retiring earlier than planned.

=== 1984 federal election ===
On July 9, only nine days after being sworn in, Turner asked Sauvé to dissolve Parliament and advised her to call an election for early September. Progressive Conservative leader Brian Mulroney and other experts had expected Turner to tour Canada during the summer and early autumn, accompanying Queen Elizabeth II and Pope John Paul II on their upcoming visits, and then call the election for later in the autumn. As the campaign unfolded, the Tories and Mulroney, who was contesting his first general election in any capacity, soon took the lead.

Early in the campaign, Turner was described as rusty and old-fashioned. His policies contrasted with Trudeau's and seemed to legitimize the Tory calls for lowering the deficit, improving relations with the United States, cutting the bureaucracy, and promoting more federal-provincial harmony. He spoke of creating "make work projects", a discarded phrase from the 1970s that had been replaced by the less patronizing "job creation programs". Turner was also caught on television patting the bottoms of Liberal Party President Iona Campagnolo and Vice-President Lise St. Martin-Tremblay, causing an uproar among feminists, who saw such behaviour as sexist and condescending.

During the televised leaders' debate, Turner attacked Mulroney over the patronage machine that the latter had allegedly set up in anticipation of victory, comparing it to the Union Nationale governments of Quebec. Mulroney responded by pointing to the raft of patronage appointments made on the advice of Trudeau and Turner. Turner had the right to advise Sauvé to cancel Trudeau's appointments—advice that she was bound to follow by convention—but failed to do so and added to his own. Mulroney demanded that Turner apologize to the country for what he called "these horrible appointments." Turner claimed that "I had no option" except to let them stand. Mulroney responded, "You had an option, sir – to say 'no' – and you chose to say 'yes' to the old attitudes and the old stories of the Liberal Party." He highlighted the Liberals' long record in government and resulting patronage appointments.

Turner discovered late in the campaign that the Liberals' electoral hopes were poor in their traditional stronghold of Quebec. The party had heretofore relied on Trudeau's appeal, patronage, and traditional dislike of the Progressive Conservatives for victory in previous elections. Turner had surrounded himself with Trudeau's factional opponents, and Trudeau himself did not endorse him. In a last-minute turnaround, Turner rehired much of Trudeau's staff during the final weeks, but this had little effect. Quebec's disaffection with the federal Liberals regarding patriation in 1982 further contributed to their defeat. Mulroney, a native Quebecker, was able to harness that discontent to the Progressive Conservatives' advantage by promising a new constitutional agreement.

On September 4, the Liberals were swept from power in a Tory landslide. The Liberals were cut down to 40 seats, the fewest in the party's history until 2011, against 211 for the Progressive Conservatives. The Liberals fell to 17 seats in Quebec, all but four in and around Montreal. Eleven members of Turner's cabinet were defeated. It was the worst defeat the Liberals experienced in a federal election since 1958.

Turner stepped down as prime minister on September 17. With the election called just over a week after he was sworn in, Turner held the office of prime minister for two months and seventeen days, the second-shortest stint in Canadian history, ahead of only Sir Charles Tupper, who took office after dissolution of parliament. Turner, Tupper and Mulroney's eventual successor, Kim Campbell, were the only prime ministers who never faced Parliament or implemented any legislative initiatives.

== Opposition leader (1984–1990) ==
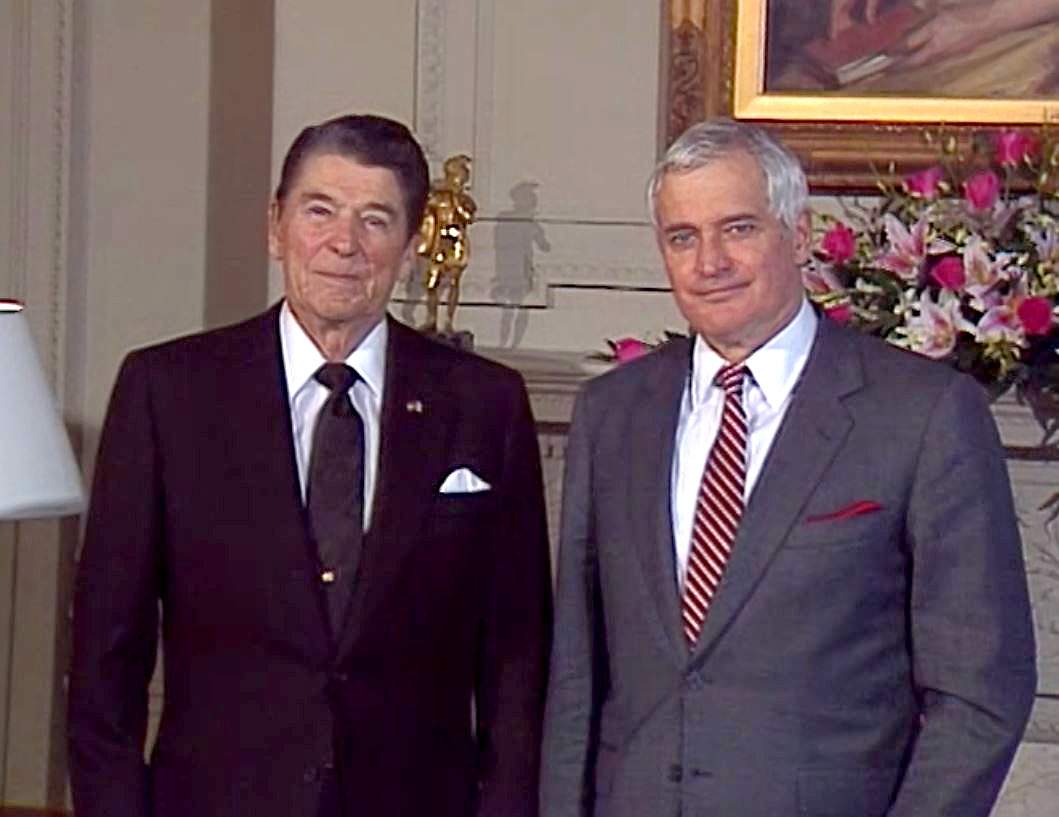
Turner with President Ronald Reagan at Rideau Hall, April 1987.

In 1984, Turner managed to defeat the Tory incumbent in Vancouver Quadra, Bill Clarke, by 3,200 votes, a surprising result given the size of the Tory wave, and became leader of the Opposition. He was the only Liberal MP from British Columbia, and one of only two from west of Ontario. The Liberals, amid their worst showing in party history and led by an unpopular Turner, were said by some pundits to be following the British Liberals into oblivion. Though the Liberals had not fared much better in the 1958 election, they had clearly emerged as the main opposition party back then. After the 1984 election, however, the NDP were not far behind with 30 seats. Their leader Ed Broadbent consistently outpolled Turner and even Mulroney, except in Quebec.

The Liberals responded by using their large Senate majority, built up over years of Liberal majorities in the Commons, to stall Mulroney's legislation. In addition, a group of young Liberal MPs, known as the "Rat Pack", repeatedly challenged Mulroney. The group included Sheila Copps, Brian Tobin, Don Boudria, and John Nunziata.

Turner's leadership was frequently questioned, and in the lead-up to the 1986 Liberal convention, a vote of confidence loomed large. The popular Jean Chrétien resigned his seat, creating a stir in caucus. Keith Davey publicly voiced concerns about Turner's leadership, which coincided with backroom struggles involving Chrétien's supporters. The public conflict reportedly influenced many Liberals to support Turner, and he ended up receiving a little over 75% of the delegate vote. The Liberals faced further internal conflict in the following years, but polls frequently placed them ahead of the Progressive Conservatives, even as Turner ranked last among preferred candidates for prime minister. The upcoming Canada–US Free Trade Agreement (FTA) and Meech Lake Accord threatened to divide the party until Turner declared his support for the Meech Lake Accord and his opposition to the FTA. Turner asked the Liberal senators to hold off on passing the legislation to implement the agreement until an election was held. It was later revealed that Mulroney had planned to call an election anyway.

=== 1988 federal election ===
When the election was called for November 21, 1988, the Liberals had some early struggles, notably during one day in Montreal when three different cost estimates were given for the proposed Liberal daycare program. The campaign was also hampered by a Canadian Broadcasting Corporation report that stated there was an effort behind the scenes to replace Turner with Chrétien.

Turner rallied support against the proposed FTA, an agreement that he said would lead to the abandonment of Canada's political sovereignty to the United States. His performance in the debate and his attacks on Mulroney and the FTA, during which he accused the Progressive Conservative Prime Minister of selling Canada out with one signature of a pen, raised his poll numbers, and soon the Liberals were hoping for a majority. This prompted the Progressive Conservatives to stop the relatively calm campaign they had been running, and follow Allan Gregg's suggestion of "bombing the bridge" between anti-FTA voters and the Liberals by undermining Turner's credibility. The ads focused on Turner's leadership struggles and, combined with over $6 million in pro-FTA ads, stopped Turner's momentum. The NDP also opposed the FTA, though less vocally, which likely resulted in vote-splitting between the opposition parties and further weakened the Liberals. Although most Canadians voted for parties opposed to free trade, the Tories were returned with a majority government and implemented the deal.

The Liberals more than doubled their representation to 83 seats and retained their role as the Official Opposition; the NDP had also made gains but finished a distant third with 43 seats. The Progressive Conservatives won a reduced majority government with 169 seats.

The election loss seemed to confirm Turner's fate; he announced in May 1989 that he would step down as party leader, officially resigning in June 1990. Turner resigned as leader of the Official Opposition while remaining Liberal leader, so Herb Gray became the caucus leader in the interim. Chrétien won that year's leadership convention over Paul Martin. Although not officially endorsed by Turner himself, Martin was widely the favourite of Turner's supporters.

Turner continued to represent Vancouver Quadra in the House of Commons before retiring from politics in the 1993 election.

== After politics ==
In 1990, Turner returned to practising law, this time working for Miller Thomson LLP, while he continued serving as an MP for another three years. He eventually became head of the firm's scholarship program. Turner was also a board member for several corporations.

Turner was a member of the Canadian delegation that monitored the runoff vote in the 2004 Ukrainian presidential election.

Turner voiced his support for the Campaign for the Establishment of a United Nations Parliamentary Assembly, an organization that campaigns for democratic reform of the United Nations and the creation of a more accountable international political system.

In 2017, he was awarded the Gold Medal of the Royal Canadian Geographical Society. Turner lived in the Deer Park neighbourhood of Toronto.

== Death and state funeral ==
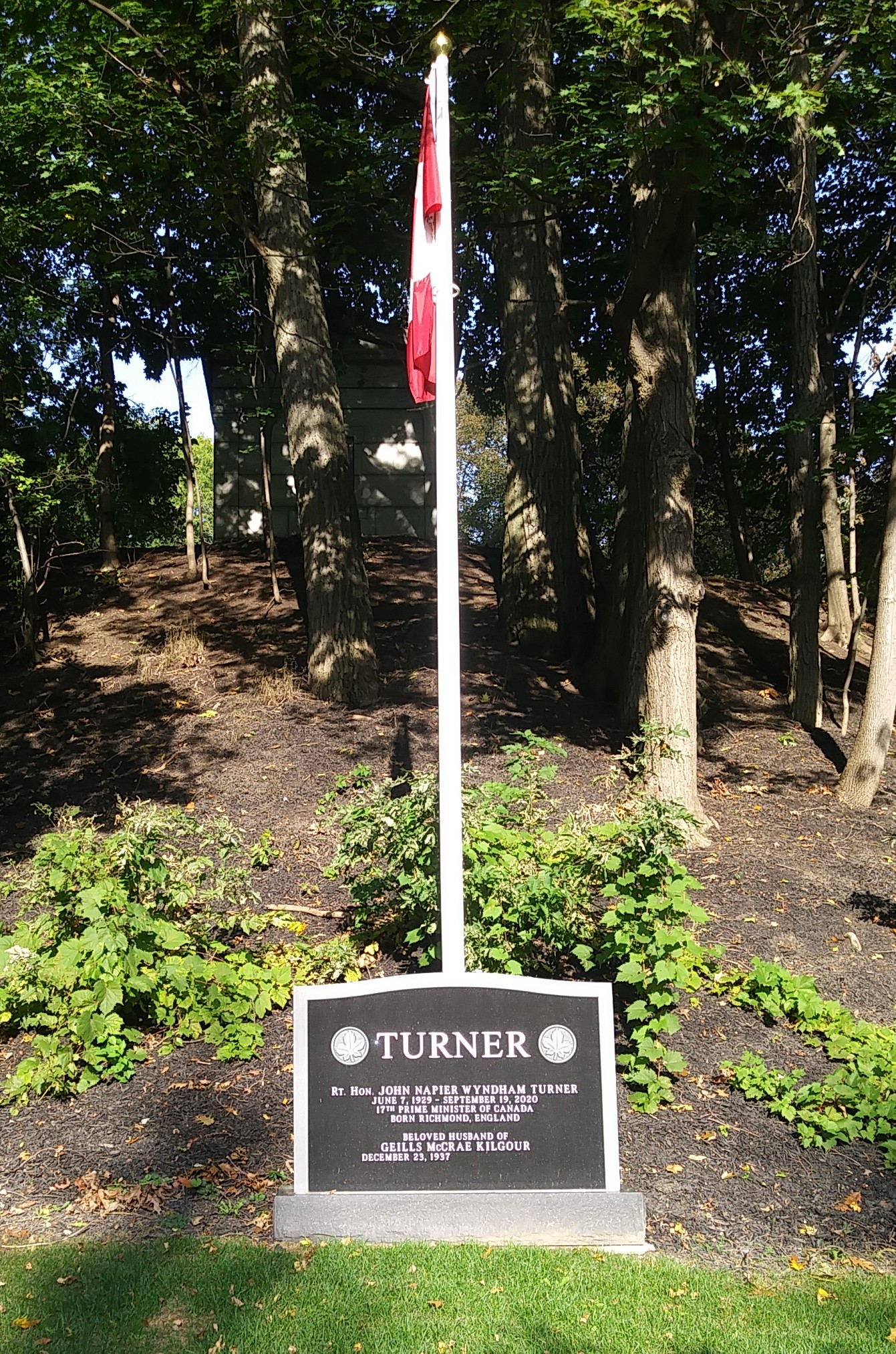
Turner's grave site in Mount Pleasant Cemetery

Turner died on September 19, 2020, at age 91, from congestive heart failure. A state funeral was held for Turner on October 6, 2020, at St. Michael's Cathedral Basilica in Toronto. The ceremony was scaled back due to the COVID-19 pandemic, with masking and social distancing protocols in place, attendance limited to 160 guests, and no lying in state. Turner was buried in a private service at Mount Pleasant Cemetery. Turner and Mackenzie King are two former prime ministers interred at Mount Pleasant.

== Honours ==

Ribbon	Description	Notes
	Companion of the Order of Canada (C.C.)	Awarded on October 19, 1994; Invested on May 3, 1995
	Centennial Anniversary of the Confederation of Canada Medal	1967; As a Minister of the Crown and an elected Member of the House of Commons of Canada, the then Honourable John Turner was awarded the medal as a member of the Canadian order of precedence.
	Queen Elizabeth II Silver Jubilee Medal for Canada	1977; As a Minister of the Crown and an elected Member of the House of Commons of Canada, the then Honourable John Turner was awarded the medal as a member of the Canadian order of precedence.
	125th Anniversary of the Confederation of Canada Medal	1992; As a former Prime Minister of Canada and a member of the Queen's Privy Council for Canada, the Right Honourable John Turner was awarded the medal as a member of the Canadian order of precedence.
	Queen Elizabeth II Golden Jubilee Medal for Canada	2002; As a former Prime Minister of Canada, a Companion of the Order of Canada, and a member of the Queen's Privy Council for Canada, the Right Honourable John Turner was awarded the medal as a member of the Canadian order of precedence.
	Queen Elizabeth II Diamond Jubilee Medal for Canada	2012; As a former Prime Minister of Canada, a Companion of the Order of Canada, and a member of the Queen's Privy Council for Canada, the Right Honourable John Turner was awarded the medal as a member of the Canadian order of precedence.

According to Canadian protocol, as a former prime minister, he was styled The Right Honourable for life.

Turner was ranked 18th out of the first 20 prime ministers of Canada (through Jean Chrétien) by a survey of Canadian historians in 1999. The survey was used in the book Prime Ministers: Ranking Canada's Leaders by J. L. Granatstein and Norman Hillmer.

Turner was appointed a Companion of the Order of Canada on October 19, 1994, and was invested on May 3, 1995. His citation reads:

He became Canada's seventeenth Prime Minister, crowning a distinguished parliamentary career during which he held several key Cabinet portfolios. Parallel to his political life, he has been a respected member of the law profession and supporter of many charitable organizations, in particular Mount Sinai Hospital and the Community Foundation of Toronto. His passion for his country is admired by all Canadians.

Coat of arms of John Turner
Crest Issuant from a coronet érablé Gules the rim bearing a frieze of alternating dogwood lily and trillium flowers all Argent a demi wolf Or charged on each shoulder with a poppy Gules seeded Sable and bearing in the dexter forepaw an ansul Gules; Escutcheon Gules four canoe paddles their handles conjoined in cross between four canoes Or on a canton the mark of the Prime Ministership of Canada (Argent four maple leaves conjoined in cross at the stem Gules); Supporters On a grassy mound rising above barry wavy Argent and Azure set between two stems growing thereon roses Gules thistles and shamrocks Or and standing in front of river cedar trees Vert dexter a caribou buck Or gorged with a collar of river cedar branches Vert pendant therefrom the badge of a member of the House of Commons of Canada sinister a caribou doe Or gorged with a like collar pendant therefrom a medallion per bend barry wavy Azure and Argent and Vert; Motto Esse Quam Videri (To Be Rather Than To Seem)

== Honorary degrees ==
Location	Date	School	Degree
New Brunswick	October 1968	University of New Brunswick	Doctor of Laws (LL.D)
Ontario	Spring 1968	York University	Doctor of Laws (LL.D)
New Brunswick	1980	Mount Allison University	Doctor of Civil Law (DCL)
British Columbia	November 24, 1994	University of British Columbia	Doctor of Laws (LL.D)
Ontario	June 1996	University of Toronto	Doctor of Laws (LL.D)
Ontario	2002	Assumption University	Doctor of Laws (LL.D)

== See also ==
- List of prime ministers of Canada

== Notes ==
20th Canadian Ministry (1968–1979) – First cabinet of Pierre Trudeau
Cabinet posts (4)
Predecessor	Office	Successor
Edgar Benson	Minister of Finance; 1972–1975	Donald Stovel Macdonald
Pierre Trudeau	Minister of Justice; 1968–1972	Otto Lang
Lawrence Pennell	Solicitor General of Canada; 1968	George James McIlraith
cont'd from 19th Min.	Minister of Consumer and Corporate Affairs; 1968	Ron Basford
19th Canadian Ministry (1963–1968) – Cabinet of Lester B. Pearson
Cabinet posts (4)
Predecessor	Office	Successor
legislation enacted	Minister of Consumer and Corporate Affairs; 1967–1968	cont'd into 20th Min.
Guy Favreau	Registrar General of Canada; 1967 styled as Minister of Consumer and Corporate Affairs	legislation enacted
	Minister without Portfolio; 1965–1967	
none	Parliamentary Secretary to the Minister of Northern Affairs and National Resources; 1963–1965	Stanley Haidasz
Political offices
Preceded by Pierre Trudeau	Prime Minister of Canada; June 30 – September 17, 1984	Succeeded by Brian Mulroney
Party political offices
Preceded by Pierre Trudeau	Leader of the Liberal Party; 1984–1990	Succeeded by Jean Chrétien
Parliament of Canada
Preceded by Brian Mulroney	Leader of the Opposition; 1984–1990	Succeeded by Herb Gray
Preceded by Egan Chambers	Member for St. Lawrence—St. George; 1962–1966	Succeeded by Abolished
Preceded by none	Member for Ottawa—Carleton; 1966–1976	Succeeded by Jean Pigott
Preceded by Bill Clarke	Member for Vancouver Quadra; 1984–1993	Succeeded by Ted McWhinney
