= Registered retirement income fund =

Canadian financial account for converted registered retirement savings

A registered retirement income fund (RRIF; French: fonds enregistré de revenu de retraite, FERR) is a tax-deferred retirement plan under Canadian tax law. Individuals use an RRIF to generate income from the savings accumulated under their registered retirement savings plan. As with an RRSP, an RRIF account is registered with the Canada Revenue Agency.

== Converting from RRSP ==
The option exists to convert a RRSP into a RRIF anytime on or before an individual reaches their 71st year. Before the end of the year in which an individual turns 71, it is mandatory to either withdraw all funds from a RRSP plan or convert the RRSP to a RRIF or life annuity. If funds are simply withdrawn from a RRSP, the entire amount is fully taxable as ordinary income; one defers this taxation by transferring investments in a RRSP into a RRIF.

== History ==
The creation of the RRIF was announced on 10 April 1978 by Jean Chrétien as part of the April 1978 Canadian federal budget. The reform was implemented by an amendment to the Income Tax Act (creation of section 146.3) which was achieved when Bill C-52 received royal assent on 30 June 1978.

As part of the federal response to the COVID-19 pandemic, RRIF minimum withdrawals amounts were reduced by 25% for 2020. The measure was implemented by the COVID-19 Emergency Response Act which received royal assent on 25 March 2020.

== Functionality ==
Investments held inside a RRIF grow in a tax-deferred manner just as with a RRSP. There are two primary differences between a RRSP and a RRIF. The first is that no further contributions can be made once conversion to a RRIF has occurred. The other is a special functionality called a minimum RRIF withdrawal.

A minimum RRIF withdrawal is an annual obligatory amount which is cashed out of a RRIF and sent to the account-holder without withholding tax. The withdrawal remains taxable Canadian income, but is eligible for a tax credit to reduce federal income tax by 15% of the first $2,000 withdrawn, if the holder is 65 years or older. In most provinces, a tax credit is also available to reduce provincial income tax.

The minimum RRIF withdrawal each year is determined by a percentage that is calculated by the account holder's age and the total value of the plan on January 1 each year. The holder of a RRIF may elect to withdraw an amount greater than the minimum RRIF amount for that year, though withholding tax will apply to this supplementary amount.

As an example, if a RRIF is valued at $500,000 when the account holder is 72 at the start of the year, the minimum annual payout will be $37,400, 7.48% of the value of the plan at the beginning of the year: (500,000 $\times$ 0.0748 = 37,400.)

The federal 2015 budget reduced the minimum withdrawal factors.

A pre-computed table for ages 65 to 78:

Age of Account Holder on January 1	Percentage of Total RRIF Value to be Withdrawn	2015 Percentage of Total RRIF Value to be Withdrawn
65	4.00%	4.00%
66	4.17%	4.17%
67	4.35%	4.35%
68	4.55%	4.55%
69	4.76%	4.76%
70	5.00%	5.00%
71	7.38%	5.28%
72	7.48%	5.40%
73	7.59%	5.53%
74	7.71%	5.67%
75	7.85%	5.82%
76	7.99%	5.98%
77	8.15%	6.17%
78	8.33%	6.36%

The minimum withdrawals are defined as:

Age of Account Holder on January 1	Percentage of Total RRIF Value to be Withdrawn	2015 Percentage of Total RRIF Value to be Withdrawn
under 71 ("x")	1/(90 − x)	1/(90 − x)
79	8.53%	6.58%
80	8.75%	6.82%
81	8.99%	7.08%
82	9.27%	7.38%
83	9.58%	7.71%
84	9.93%	8.08%
85	10.33%	8.51%
86	10.79%	8.99%
87	11.33%	9.55%
88	11.96%	10.21%
89	12.71%	10.99%
90	13.62%	11.92%
91	14.73%	13.06%
92	16.12%	14.49%
93	17.92%	16.34%
94	20.00%	18.79%
95+	20.00%	20.00%

== See also ==
- Canada Revenue Agency
- Income tax
- Registered retirement savings plan
- Retirement
