= Registered retirement savings plan =

Canadian financial account for savings and investment assets

A registered retirement savings plan (RRSP) (French: régime enregistré d'épargne-retraite, REER), or retirement savings plan (RSP), is a Canadian financial account intended to provide retirement income, while remaining accessible at any time. RRSPs reduce taxes compared to normally taxed accounts. They were introduced in 1957 to promote savings by employees and self-employed people.

They must comply with a variety of restrictions stipulated in the Income Tax Act. Qualified investments include savings accounts, guaranteed investment certificates (GICs), bonds, mortgage loans, mutual funds, income trusts, common and preferred shares listed on a designated stock exchange, exchange-traded funds, call and put options listed on a designated stock exchange, foreign currency, and labour-sponsored funds. Short call contracts covered by long stock ("covered calls") are eligible, however, cash secured puts (short put contracts covered by cash) are not eligible. Rules determine the maximum contributions, the timing of contributions, the assets allowed, and the eventual conversion to a registered retirement income fund (RRIF), or an annuity, or the withdrawal of all funds within the RRSP, at age 71.

== Taxation ==
Contributions to RRSPs are deductible from income, reducing income tax payable for the year in which the contributions are claimed. The holder of the RRSP (the "annuitant") can defer the deduction due to the contribution to a later year.

Taxable income of qualified investments of the trust is not taxed, as set out in section 146(4) of the Income Tax Act.

If the RRSP earns business income, the business income is subject to taxation on the basis of the business income less the amount of business income arising from the sale of qualified investments. The effect of this rule, set out in section 146(4)(b)(i) and (ii) of the Income Tax Act, is that business income on qualified investments, earned within an RRSP, is subject to zero tax while the income remains within the RRSP. This means that business income, for example, due to day trading within the RRSP, is not taxed, so long as the business income is due entirely to the sale of qualified investments. This treatment differs from that of most other registered accounts to the RRSP and the Registered Retirement Income Fund (RRIF), as, for example, in the case of the Tax Free Savings Account (TFSA), business income is taxable as personal income earned by the TFSA holder.

All withdrawals except for withdrawals due to participation in the Home Buyers' Plan and the Lifelong Learning Plan are taxed as income when they are withdrawn. This is the same tax treatment provided to Registered Pension Plans established by employers. Preliminary tax may be withheld at withdrawal.

RRSP accounts can be set up with either one or two associated individuals:

- Individual RRSP: an individual RRSP is associated with only a single person, called an account holder. With Individual RRSPs, the account holder is also called a contributor, as only they contribute money to their RRSP.
- Spousal RRSP: a spousal RRSP allows a higher earner, called a spousal contributor, to contribute to an RRSP in their spouse's name. In this case, it is the spouse who is the account holder. The spouse can withdraw the funds, subject to tax, after a holding period. A spousal RRSP is a means of splitting income in retirement: By dividing investment properties between both spouses each spouse will receive half the income, and thus the marginal tax rate will be lower than if one spouse earned all of the income.
- Group RRSP: in a group RRSP, an employer arranges for employees to make contributions, as they wish, through a schedule of regular payroll deductions. The employee can decide the size of contribution per year and the employer will deduct an amount accordingly and submit it to the investment manager selected to administer the group account. The contribution is then deposited into the employee’s individual account and invested as specified. The primary benefit with a group plan is that the employee-contributor realizes the tax savings immediately, because the income taxes his or her employer must deduct on every paycheque can be reduced. By contrast, if a taxpayer making a private contribution is not expecting to owe more than $3,000 ($1,800 in Quebec) at the end of the year, then he or she will have to wait until the end of the tax year (or even not until after that in the case of taxpayers expecting a refund) before realizing the benefit.
- Pooled RRSP: legislation was introduced during the 41st Canadian parliament in 2011 to create pooled retirement pension plans (PRPP). PRPPs would be aimed at employees and employers in small businesses, and at self-employed people.

== Benefits from tax savings ==
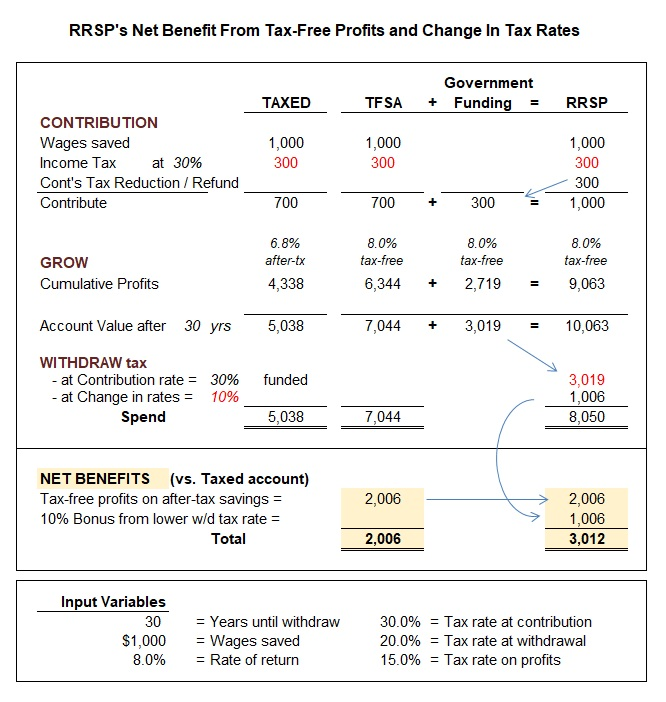
The RRSP's benefit comes mainly from the same benefit as a TFSA (permanently tax free profits on after-tax savings), plus a bonus/penalty from changing tax rates.

There are a few benefit factors that add to a total. The only benefit that everyone always gets is from permanently tax-free profits on after-tax savings. This is the same and equal benefit as from a TFSA. The conceptual understanding is that the contribution's tax reduction is the government investing its money alongside the saver's, for the saver to invest as she likes. They become co-owners of the account. The government's share of the account (funding plus the tax-free profits earned by it) at withdrawal fully funds the account's withdrawal tax calculated at the contribution's tax rate. So the contribution's tax reduction is never a benefit, and profits are never taxed. The withdrawal tax is conceptually an allocation of principal between owners, not a 'tax', and there is no benefit 'from deferral'.

There is a possible bonus (or penalty) from withdrawal tax rates lower (or higher) than at contribution. Both are possibilities. It equals the dollars withdrawn multiplied by the difference in tax rates. The tax rates used for this calculation are the effective rates that include the impact of the RRSP contributions / withdrawals on the qualification for benefits from other income-tested programs.

There is a growing cost from any delay in claiming the contribution's tax refund.

== Contributing ==
Any resident of Canada who filed a tax return for the year prior to the year of the contribution, can contribute to an RRSP, up until December 31 of the year in which the RRSP annuitant (holder) turns 71. Contributions and deductions are two different things. Contributions are usually deducted from taxable income in the same tax year but may be deferred by the annuitant to future years. Because Canada has a progressive tax system, taxes are reduced at the individual's highest marginal rate. For individuals who always claim the same deduction amount as their yearly contribution, their maximum contribution is the 'deduction limit' calculated by the Canada Revenue Agency.

The 'deduction limit' is a running total calculated for the next year and printed on every notice of assessment or reassessment, provided the taxpayer is aged 71 years or younger. It is reduced by tax deductions claimed and increased by the year's contribution limit, minus any pension adjustment (PA) and past service pension adjustment (PSPA), plus pension adjustment reversals (PAR).

Since 1991, contribution limits are calculated at 18% of the prior year's reported earned income (from employment or self-employment), up to a maximum. The maximum has been rising as shown in the table below. Since 2010 it is indexed to the annual increase in the average wage.

Year	Contribution limit	Year	Contribution limit
1991	$11,500	2008	$20,000
1992	$12,500	2009	$21,000
1993	$12,500	2010	$22,000
1994	$13,500	2011	$22,450
1995	$14,500	2012	$22,970
1996	$13,500	2013	$23,820
1997	$13,500	2014	$24,270
1998	$13,500	2015	$24,930
1999	$13,500	2016	$25,370
2000	$13,500	2017	$26,010
2001	$13,500	2018	$26,230
2002	$13,500	2019	$26,500
2003	$14,500	2020	$27,230
2004	$15,500	2021	$27,830
2005	$16,500	2022	$29,210
2006	$18,000	2023	$30,780
2007	$19,000	2024	$31,560

While it is possible to contribute more than the contributor's deduction limit, it is generally not advised as any amount $2,000 over the deduction limit is subject to a significant penalty tax removing all benefits (1% per month on the overage amount).

RRSP contributions can be made up until and including the 60th day following December 31 of the tax year of the contribution. For example, contributions for the 2023 tax year can be made up until and including February 29, 2024. Unused contributions carry forward until December 31 in the year the annuitant reaches 71 years of age, at which point the unused contributions are cancelled.

Prior to 1991, contribution limits were calculated at 20% of the prior year's reported earned income, up to a maximum of $7,500 for taxfilers without an employer-sponsored registered pension plan, or $3,500 for taxfilers who had an employer-sponsored registered pension plan. Furthermore, any unused portion of the contribution limit could not be held for future use, and was therefore lost forever if not contributed before the 60 first days of the year.

== Withdrawals ==
An account holder is able to withdraw dollars or assets from an RRSP at any age. Withholding tax is deducted by the institution managing the account. Amounts withdrawn must be included in the taxable income of that year. The tax withheld reduces the taxes owing at year end. There are two exceptions to this process: the Home Buyers' Plan and the Lifelong Learning Plan.

Before the end of the year the account holder turns 71, the RRSP must either be cashed out or transferred to a Registered Retirement Income Fund (RRIF) or an annuity. Until 2007, account holders were required to make this decision at age 69 rather than 71.

Investments held in a RRIF continue to grow tax-free, though an obligatory minimum RRIF withdrawal amount is cashed out and sent to the account holder each year.

On death the assets remaining in the account are withdrawn and distributed directly to the named beneficiary. They do not flow through the estate. The account is closed. Like other withdrawals, the value of the assets is included in the taxable income of the account's owner. This large lump sum may result in much of its value being taxed at the top tax bracket. The liability to pay the tax lies with the estate, no matter who received the account's assets.

There are exceptions. When a spouse is the named beneficiary, the account continues, without triggering taxes, in the name of the spouse. There are also provisions for the tax-free transfer of assets to minor children, grandchildren and dependents.

== Special withdrawal programs ==
=== Home buyers' plan ===
While the original purpose of RRSPs was to help Canadians save for retirement, it is possible to use RRSP funds to help purchase one's first home under what is known as the Home Buyers' Plan (HBP, French: régime d'accession à la propriété). An RRSP holder can borrow, tax-free, up to $35,000 from their RRSP (and another $35,000 from a spousal RRSP) towards buying their residence. This loan has to be repaid within 15 years after two years of grace. Contrary to popular belief, this plan can be used more than once per lifetime, as long as the borrower did not own a residence in the previous five years, and has fully repaid any previous loans under this plan. Originally introduced in the 1992 federal budget, the initial amount that could be borrowed was $15,000. Seventeen years later the amount was raised to $25,000 in the 2009 budget. The 2019 budget raised that amount again to $35,000.

=== Lifelong learning plan ===
Similarly to the home buyers' plan, the Life-Long Learning Plan (LLP, French: régime d'encouragement à l'éducation permanente) allows for temporary diversions of tax-free funds from an RRSP. This program allows individuals to borrow from an RRSP to go or return to post-secondary school. The user may withdraw up to $10,000 per year to a maximum of $20,000. The first repayment under the LLP will be due at the earliest of the following two dates.

1. 60 days after the fifth year following the first withdrawal
2. the second year after the last year the student was enrolled in full-time studies

== Account structure ==
Both individual and spousal RRSPs can be held in one of three account structures. One or more of the account types below may not be an option depending on what type of investment instrument (example stocks, mutual funds, bonds) is being held inside the RRSP.

=== Client-held accounts ===
Client-held, or client-name accounts, exist when an account holder uses their RRSP contributions to purchase an investment with a particular investment company. Each time that an individual uses RRSP contribution money to purchase an investment at a different fund company, it results in a separate client-held account being opened. For example, if an individual buys investment #1 with one company and investment #2 with another, the individual would have separate RRSP accounts held with two different companies.

The main benefits of client-name accounts is that they do not generally incur annual fees or "exit fees", the investment is registered with the trustee in the client's name instead of the "dealer's" name and therefore, client-name investments are not subject to bankruptcy issues if the dealer goes bankrupt. Another benefit is that a Dealer Statement generated quarterly by the Mutual Fund Dealer; and Exempt Market Dealer contain all investment activity (buy, sell, switch) through that dealer for ease of tracking investments. The Dealer Statement contains all types of plans for registered investments (RRSP, RRIF, Tax-Free Savings Account, Locked-in Retirement Account, Life Income Fund) and non-registered investments thereby making it easy to track investments in one place.

Generally, client-held accounts are for mutual funds and exempt products only; therefore, if an investor holds stocks and bonds along with mutual funds or exempt products, a Nominee or Intermediary account is most beneficial for ease of tracking all types of investments in one place.

=== Nominee accounts ===
Nominee accounts are so named because individuals with this type of account nominate a nominee, usually one of Canada's five major banks or a major investment dealer, to hold a number of different investments in a single account. For example, if an individual buys investment #1 with one company and investment #2 with another, both investments are held in a single RRSP account with the nominee, a chartered bank.

The main benefit of a nominee account is the ability to keep track of all RRSP investments within a single account. The main detriment is that nominee accounts often incur annual fees.

A "self-directed" RRSP (SDRSP) is a special kind of nominee account. It is essentially a trading account at a brokerage that has tax-sheltered status. The holder of a self-directed RRSP instructs the brokerage to buy and sell securities on their behalf as with any brokerage account. The reason that it is described as "self-directed" is that the holder of this kind of RRSP directs all the investment decisions themselves, and does not normally have the service of an investment advisor.

=== Intermediary accounts ===
Intermediary accounts are essentially identical in function to nominee accounts. The reason investors would have an intermediary account instead of a nominee account has to do with the investment advisor they deal with, as advisors not aligned with a major bank or investment dealer may not have the logistical ability to offer nominee accounts to their clients.

As a result, the advisor will approach an intermediary company which is able to offer the investor identical benefits as those offered by a nominee account. The two main Canadian financial institutions that offer intermediary services are B2B Bank and Canadian Western Trust.

The main benefits and detriments of intermediary accounts are identical as those offered by nominee accounts.

== RRSP rollover ==
It is possible to have an RRSP roll over to an adult dependent survivor, child or grandchild, as it would to a spouse. This was made possible in 2003 and there are various Income Tax Act (ITA) requirements to allow this to take place. The new registered asset could result in provincial benefits being cut off. In many cases a court application to have someone appointed guardian of the child’s property and person would be necessary to provide a legally authorized party to manage the asset if the child is deemed incompetent to do so. This possibility affects the overall estate plan and often the distribution of the estate.

Acquiring this asset may also affect the adult dependent child's eligibility for provincial assistance programs. A Henson trust may be useful for enabling the adult dependent child to receive RRSP rollovers and still be eligible for provincial social assistance programs such as Ontario disability support program (ODSP). A lifetime benefit trust (LBT) is a new option that may be valuable for leaving a personal trust in a will for a special needs, financially dependent child, grandchild or spouse. It has the added benefit that RRSP assets dedicated to the LBT could be protected from creditors.

== Foreign content ==
Originally, RRSPs were limited to mostly domestic content, that is, Canadian based investments such as GICs, bonds and shares of Canadian corporations, and mutual funds holding such assets. Non-Canadian content was limited to 10% of the plan's assets, originally measured by market value, and in 1971 changed to 10% of book value.

In 1994, the foreign content limit was raised to 20%. However, by then, mutual fund managers found a way to get around this limitation and offer unitholders exposure to foreign markets without using up any of the foreign content quota. They typically did this by holding all fund assets in Canadian treasury bills or similar cash equivalent assets, and using foreign equity index futures or forward contracts with a similar notional value to obtain equivalent market exposure.

In 2001, the foreign content limit was raised yet again, this time to 30%, but the prevalence of synthetic foreign funds was such as to make the limit largely a formality.

In 2005, the law was changed to remove foreign content limit altogether.

== Similar accounts in other countries ==
- Individual retirement account (IRA) and 401(k) (United States)
- Self-invested personal pension (SIPP) and individual savings account (ISA) (United Kingdom)
- Personal Retirement Savings Account (PRSA) (Ireland)
- Superannuation (Australia)
- KiwiSaver (New Zealand)
- Nippon individual savings account (NISA) (Japan)
- Mandatory Provident Fund (Hong Kong)
- Vanuatu National Provident Fund (Vanuatu) – a compulsory savings scheme for Employees who receive a salary of Vt3, 000 or more a month, to help them financially at retirement.
- Central Provident Fund (Singapore)
- Employees Provident Fund (Malaysia)
- Pensions in Chile

== See also ==
- Registered retirement income fund (RRIF)
- Locked-in retirement account (LIRA) for Locked-in Retirement Savings Plan (LRSP), Life Income Funds (LIF), Locked-In Retirement Income Funds (LRIF), Prescribed Retirement Income Fund (PRIF)
- Registered education savings plan (RESP)
- Registered Home Ownership Savings Plan (RHOSP)
- Henson trust
- Saskatchewan Pension Plan
- Retirement compensation arrangements (Canada) (RCA)
- Tax-free savings account (Canada) (TFSA)
- Taxation in Canada
- Pension
- First home savings account
