= Pierre Trudeau =

Prime Minister of Canada (1968–1979; 1980–1984)

The Right Honourable Pierre Trudeau PC CC CH QC FRSC
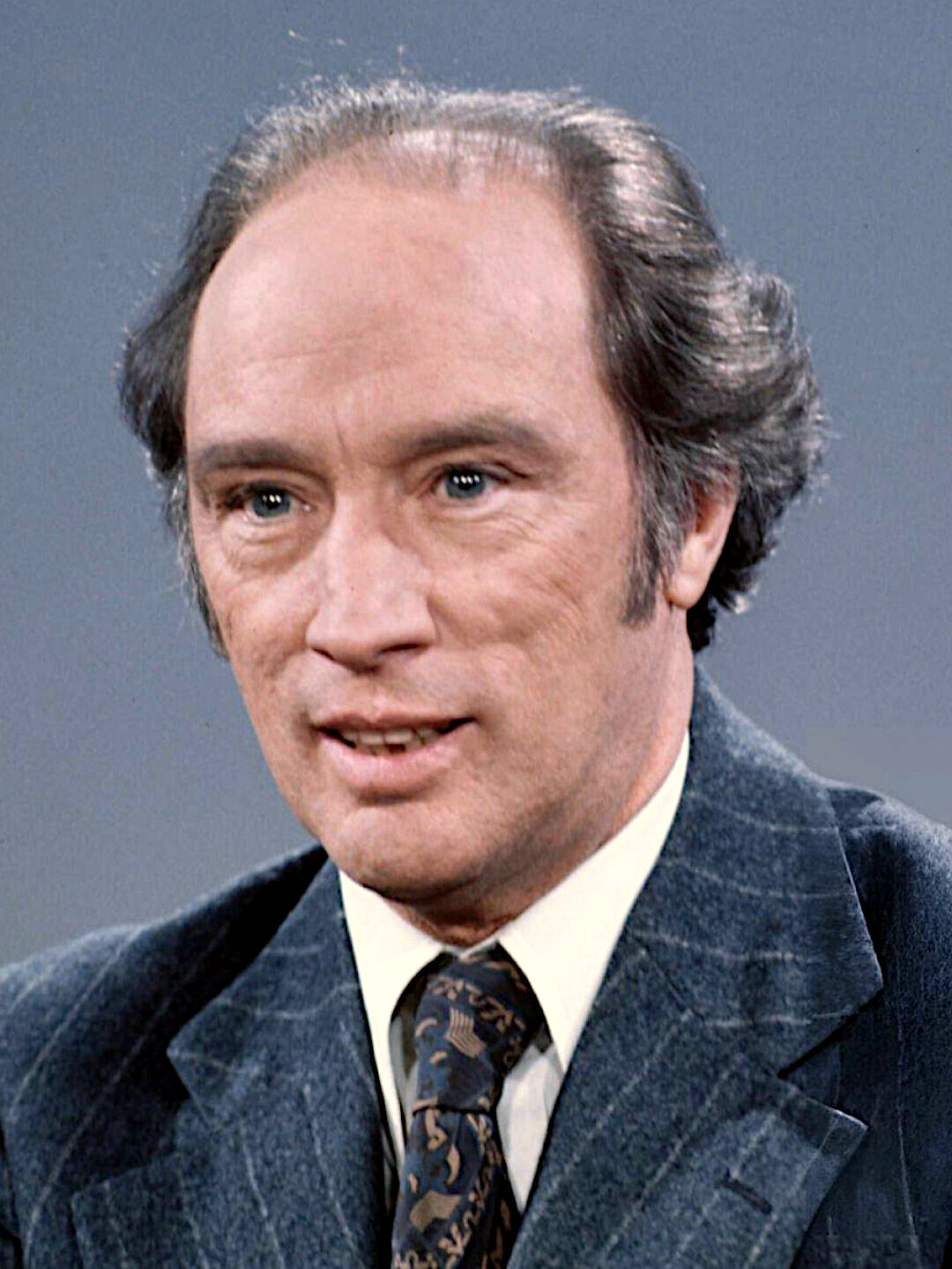
- UPI press photo, 1975

15th Prime Minister of Canada
- In office March 3, 1980 – June 30, 1984
- Monarch: Elizabeth II
- Governors General: Edward Schreyer; Jeanne Sauvé
- Deputy: Allan MacEachen
- Preceded by: Joe Clark
- Succeeded by: John Turner
- In office April 20, 1968 – June 4, 1979
- Monarch: Elizabeth II
- Governors General: Roland Michener; Jules Léger; Edward Schreyer
- Deputy: Allan MacEachen (1977–1979)
- Preceded by: Lester B. Pearson
- Succeeded by: Joe Clark

Leader of the Opposition
- In office June 4, 1979 – March 3, 1980
- Preceded by: Joe Clark
- Succeeded by: Joe Clark

Leader of the Liberal Party
- In office April 6, 1968 – June 16, 1984
- Preceded by: Lester B. Pearson
- Succeeded by: John Turner

Minister of Justice Attorney General of Canada
- In office April 4, 1967 – July 5, 1968
- Prime Minister: Lester B. Pearson; Himself
- Preceded by: Louis Cardin
- Succeeded by: John Turner

Member of Parliament for Mount Royal
- In office November 8, 1965 – September 4, 1984
- Preceded by: Alan Macnaughton
- Succeeded by: Sheila Finestone

Personal details
- Born: Joseph Philippe Pierre Yves Elliott Trudeau; October 18, 1919 Montreal, Quebec, Canada
- Died: September 28, 2000 (aged 80) Montreal, Quebec, Canada
- Resting place: Saint-Rémi Cemetery, Saint-Rémi, Quebec
- Party: Liberal (from 1965)
- Other political affiliations: New Democratic (1961–1965); Co-operative Commonwealth Federation (until 1961)
- Spouse: Margaret Sinclair (m. 1971; div. 1984)
- Children: 4, including Justin, Alexandre, Michel
- Parent: Charles-Émile Trudeau (father)
- Relatives: Trudeau family
- Education: Collège Jean-de-Brébeuf (DEC); Université de Montréal (LLB); Harvard University (MA); Sciences Po; London School of Economics
- Occupation: Politician; lawyer; jurist; academic; author; journalist

Military service
- Allegiance: Canada
- Branch/service: Canadian Army
- Years of service: 1943–1945
- Rank: Officer Cadet
- Unit: Canadian Officers' Training Corps
- Pierre Trudeau's voice Trudeau on tensions between the Warsaw Pact and NATO; Recorded December 15, 1983

Joseph Philippe Pierre Yves Elliott Trudeau (Note: /ˈtruːdoʊ, truːˈdoʊ/ TROO-doh, troo-DOH; French: [pjɛʁ tʁydo]) (October 18, 1919 – September 28, 2000) was a Canadian politician, lawyer, jurist, academic, author, and journalist who served as the 15th prime minister of Canada from 1968 to 1979 and from 1980 to 1984. He served as leader of the Official Opposition from 1979 to 1980. He led the Liberal Party from 1968 until 1984 and was the member of Parliament (MP) for Mount Royal from 1965 to 1984.

Born and raised in Outremont, Quebec, Trudeau studied law and political economy. He co-founded Cité Libre in 1950 and rose to prominence in Quebec politics by opposing the conservative Union Nationale government. He was also an associate professor of law at the Université de Montréal. Trudeau was initially part of the New Democratic Party (NDP), but then joined the Liberal Party in 1965 because he believed the NDP could not attain power. In the election held that year, he was elected to the House of Commons and was promptly appointed as parliamentary secretary to Prime Minister Lester B. Pearson. Trudeau served as minister of justice and attorney general from 1967 to 1968, during which time he liberalized divorce and abortion laws and decriminalized homosexuality. His outgoing personality and charisma caused a sensation, termed "Trudeaumania", which helped him win the leadership of the Liberal Party in 1968. He then succeeded Pearson and became prime minister of Canada.

From the late 1960s until the mid-1980s, Trudeau dominated the Canadian political scene. After his appointment as prime minister, he led the Liberals to victory in the 1968, 1972, and 1974 federal elections, before narrowly losing in 1979. He won a fourth election victory in 1980. Trudeau is the most recent prime minister to win four federal elections (having won three majority governments and one minority government) and to serve non-consecutive terms. His tenure of 15 years and 164 days makes him the third longest-serving prime minister in Canadian history, behind John A. Macdonald and William Lyon Mackenzie King.

As prime minister, Trudeau pioneered official bilingualism and multiculturalism. Amid the Quebec sovereignty movement, he invoked the War Measures Act in response to the 1970 October Crisis and later led the federalist campaign to victory in the 1980 Quebec referendum. In economic policy, he introduced the capital gains tax, expanded social programs, sharply increased deficit spending, and responded to the 1970s recession through wage and price controls. In a bid to move the Liberal Party towards economic nationalism, Trudeau established Petro-Canada and launched the National Energy Program, both of which generated significant controversy in oil-rich Western Canada and increased Western alienation. Trudeau's government also converted Canada to the metric system, created Via Rail, and enacted the Access to Information Act and the Canada Health Act. In foreign policy, Trudeau reduced Canada's alignment with the United States, maintained cordial relations with the Soviet Union, formally recognized the People's Republic of China, and developed strong ties with Cuban leader Fidel Castro. He also oversaw Canada's entry into the G7. In 1982, Trudeau patriated the Constitution of Canada and established the Canadian Charter of Rights and Freedoms, which achieved full Canadian sovereignty.

Trudeau retired from politics shortly before the 1984 federal election. In his retirement, he practised law at the Montreal law firm of Heenan Blaikie. He also spoke out against the Meech Lake and Charlottetown accords (which proposed granting Quebec certain concessions), arguing they would strengthen Quebec nationalism. Trudeau died in 2000, aged 80. He is ranked highly among scholars in historical rankings of Canadian prime ministers, but remains a divisive figure in Canadian politics. Critics accused him of arrogance, economic mismanagement, and unduly centralizing Canadian decision-making to the detriment of the culture of Quebec and the economy of the Prairies, while admirers praised what they considered to be the force of his intellect and his political acumen, which helped maintain national unity during the Quebec sovereignty movement. Trudeau's eldest son, Justin Trudeau, served as prime minister of Canada from 2015 to 2025, and was the first child of a former prime minister to serve as prime minister.

== Early life ==
The Trudeau family can be traced to Marcillac-Lanville in France in the 16th century and to a Robert Truteau (1544–1589). In 1659, the first Trudeau to arrive in Canada was Étienne Trudeau or Truteau (1641–1712), a carpenter and home builder from La Rochelle.

Pierre Trudeau was born at home in Outremont, Quebec, on October 18, 1919, to Charles-Émile "Charley" Trudeau (1887–1935), a French-Canadian businessman and lawyer, and Grace Elliott, who was of mixed Scottish and French-Canadian descent. He had an older sister named Suzette and a younger brother named Charles Jr. Trudeau remained close to both siblings for his entire life. Trudeau's paternal grandparents were French-speaking Quebec farmers. His father had acquired the B&A gas station chain (now defunct), some "profitable mines, the Belmont amusement park in Montreal and the Montreal Royals, the city's minor-league baseball team", by the time Trudeau was fifteen. When his father died in Orlando, Florida, on April 10, 1935, Trudeau and each of his siblings inherited $5,000 (equivalent to $110,000 in 2025), a considerable sum at that time, which meant that he was financially secure and independent. His mother, Grace, "doted on Pierre", and he remained close to her throughout her long life. After her husband died, she left the management of her inheritance to others and spent a lot of her time working for the Roman Catholic Church and various charities, travelling frequently to New York City, Florida, Europe, and Maine, sometimes with her children. Already in his late teens, Trudeau was "directly involved in managing a large inheritance".

== Early education ==
From the age of six to twelve, Trudeau attended the primary school Académie Querbes, in Outremont, where he became immersed in the Catholic religion. The school, which was for both English and French Catholics, was an exclusive school with very small classes, and he excelled in mathematics and religion. From his earliest years, Trudeau was fluently bilingual, which would later prove to be a "big asset for a politician in bilingual Canada." As a teenager, he attended the Jesuit French-language Collège Jean-de-Brébeuf, a prestigious secondary school known for educating elite francophone families in Quebec.

In his seventh and final academic year, 1939–1940, Trudeau focused on winning a Rhodes Scholarship. In his application, he wrote that he had prepared for public office by studying public speaking and publishing many articles in Brébeuf. His letters of recommendation praised him highly. Father Boulin, who was the head of the college, said that during Trudeau's seven years at the college (1933–1940), he had won a "hundred prizes and honourable mentions" and "performed with distinction in all fields". Trudeau graduated from Collège Jean-de-Brébeuf in 1940 at the age of twenty-one.

Trudeau did not win the Rhodes Scholarship. He consulted several people on his options, including Henri Bourassa, the economist Edmond Montpetit, and Father Robert Bernier, a Franco-Manitoban. Following their advice, he chose a career in politics and a degree in law at the Université de Montréal.

== Second World War ==
In its obituary, The Economist described Trudeau as "parochial as a young man", who "dismissed" the Second World War "as a squabble between the big powers, although he later regretted 'missing one of the major events of the century'." In his 1993 memoir, Memoirs, Trudeau wrote that the outbreak of the Second World War in September 1939 and his father's death were the two "great bombshells" that marked his teenage years. In his first year at university, the prime topics of conversation were the Battle of France, the Battle of Britain, and the London blitz. He wrote that in the early 1940s, when he was in his early twenties, he thought, "So there was a war? Tough. It wouldn't stop me from concentrating on my studies so long as that was possible...[I]f you were a French Canadian in Montreal [at that time], you did not automatically believe that this was a just war. In Montreal in the early 1940s, we still knew nothing about the Holocaust and we tended to think of this war as a settling of scores among the superpowers."

Young Trudeau opposed conscription for overseas service, and in 1942 he campaigned for the anti-conscription candidate Jean Drapeau (later the mayor of Montreal) in Outremont. Trudeau described a speech he heard in Montreal by Ernest Lapointe, minister of justice and Prime Minister William Lyon Mackenzie King's Quebec lieutenant. Lapointe had been a Liberal MP during the 1917 Conscription Crisis, in which the Canadian government had deployed up to 1,200 soldiers to suppress the anti-conscription Easter Riots in Quebec City in March and April 1918. In a final and bloody conflict, armed rioters fired on the troops, and the soldiers returned fire. At least five men were killed by gunfire and there were over 150 casualties and $300,000 in damage. In 1939, it was Lapointe who helped draft the Liberals' policy against conscription for service overseas. Lapointe was aware that a new conscription crisis would destroy the national unity that Mackenzie King had been trying to build since the end of the First World War. Trudeau believed Lapointe had lied and broken his promise. His criticisms of King's wartime policies, such as "suspension of habeas corpus", the "farce of bilingualism and French-Canadian advancement in the army," and the "forced 'voluntary' enrolment", were scathing.

As a university student, Trudeau joined the Canadian Officers' Training Corps (COTC), which trained at the local armoury in Montreal during the school term and undertook further training at Camp Farnham each summer. Although the National Resources Mobilization Act, enacted in 1940, originally provided that conscripts could not be required to serve outside of Canada, Parliament amended the act and removed that restriction in 1942. The Conscription Crisis of 1944 arose in response to the Allied invasion of Normandy in June 1944.

== Education ==
Trudeau continued his full-time studies in law at the Université de Montréal while in the COTC from 1940 until his graduation in 1943. Following his graduation, he articled for a year and, in late 1944, began his master's degree in political economy at Harvard University's Graduate School of Public Administration (now the John F. Kennedy School of Government). In his Memoir, he admitted that it was at Harvard's "super-informed environment" that he realized the "historic importance" of the war and that he had "missed one of the major events of the century in which [he] was living." Harvard had become a major intellectual centre, as fascism in Europe led to a great migration of intellectuals to the United States.

Trudeau's Harvard dissertation was on the topic of communism and Christianity. At Harvard, an American and predominantly Protestant university, Trudeau, a French Canadian Catholic living outside the province of Quebec for the first time, felt like an outsider. As his sense of isolation deepened, he decided in 1947 to continue his work on his Harvard dissertation in Paris, where he studied at the Institut d'Études Politiques de Paris (Sciences Po). The Harvard dissertation remained unfinished when Trudeau briefly entered a doctoral program to study under the socialist economist Harold Laski at the London School of Economics (LSE). This cemented Trudeau's belief that Keynesian economics and social sciences were essential to the creation of the "good life" in a democratic society. Over a five-week period he attended many lectures and became a follower of personalism after being influenced most notably by Emmanuel Mounier. He also was influenced by Nikolai Berdyaev, particularly his book Slavery and Freedom. Max and Monique Nemni argue that Berdyaev's book influenced Trudeau's rejection of nationalism and separatism.

In mid-1948, Trudeau embarked on world travels to find a sense of purpose. At the age of twenty-eight, he travelled to Poland where he visited Auschwitz, then Czechoslovakia, Austria, Hungary, Yugoslavia, Bulgaria, and the Middle East, including Turkey, Jordan, and southern Iraq. Although he was wealthy, Trudeau travelled with a backpack in "self-imposed hardship". He used his British passport instead of his Canadian passport in his travels through Pakistan, India, China, and Japan, often wearing local clothing to blend in. According to The Economist, when Trudeau returned to Canada in 1949 after an absence of five months, his mind was "seemingly broadened" from his studies at Harvard, Sciences Po, and the LSE, as well as his travels. He was "appalled at the narrow nationalism in his native French-speaking Quebec, and the authoritarianism of the province's government".

== Quiet Revolution ==
Several events in Quebec foreshadowed the Quiet Revolution. These included the 1948 release of the anti-establishment manifesto Refus global, the publication of Les insolences du Frère Untel, the 1949 Asbestos Strike, and the 1955 Richard Riot. Artists and intellectuals in Quebec signed the Refus global on August 9, 1948, in opposition to the repressive rule of Quebec Premier Maurice Duplessis and the decadent "social establishment" in Quebec, including the Catholic Church. When he returned to Montreal in 1949, Trudeau quickly became a leading figure opposing Duplessis's rule. He actively supported the workers in the Asbestos strike which opposed Duplessis in 1949. Trudeau was the co-founder and editor of Cité Libre, a dissident journal that helped provide the intellectual basis for the Quiet Revolution. In 1956, he edited an important book on the subject, La grève de l'amiante, which argued that the asbestos miners' strike of 1949 was a seminal event in Quebec's history, marking the beginning of resistance to the conservative, Francophone clerical establishment and Anglophone business class that had long ruled the province.

== Career ==
Because of Trudeau's labour union activities in Asbestos, Duplessis blacklisted him, and he was unable to teach law at the Université de Montréal. He surprised his closest friends in Quebec when he became a civil servant in Ottawa in 1949. Until 1951, he worked in the Privy Council Office of the Liberal prime minister Louis St. Laurent as an economic policy adviser. He wrote in his memoirs that he found this period very useful when he entered politics later on, and that senior civil servant Norman Robertson tried unsuccessfully to persuade him to stay on.

Trudeau's progressive values and his close ties with Co-operative Commonwealth Federation (CCF) intellectuals (including F. R. Scott, Eugene Forsey, Michael Kelway Oliver and Charles Taylor) led to his support of and membership in the party throughout the 1950s.

An associate professor of law at the Université de Montréal from 1961 to 1965, Trudeau's views evolved towards a liberal position in favour of individual rights counter to the state and made him an opponent of Quebec nationalism. He admired labour unions, which were tied to the Cooperative Commonwealth Federation (CCF), and tried to infuse his Liberal Party with some of their reformist zeal. By the late 1950s, Trudeau began to reject social democratic and labour parties, arguing that they should put their narrow goals aside and join forces with Liberals to fight for democracy first. In economic theory, he was influenced by professors Joseph Schumpeter and John Kenneth Galbraith while he was at Harvard. In 1963, Trudeau criticized the Liberal Party of Lester B. Pearson when it supported arming Bomarc missiles in Canada with nuclear warheads.

During his time as a professor at the Université de Montréal, he was featured in Denis Héroux's 1964 student film Over My Head (Jusqu'au cou), appearing as himself in a political debate.

Trudeau was offered a position at Queen's University teaching political science by James Corry, who later became Principal of Queen's, but turned it down because he preferred to teach in Quebec.

== Early political career (1965–1967) ==
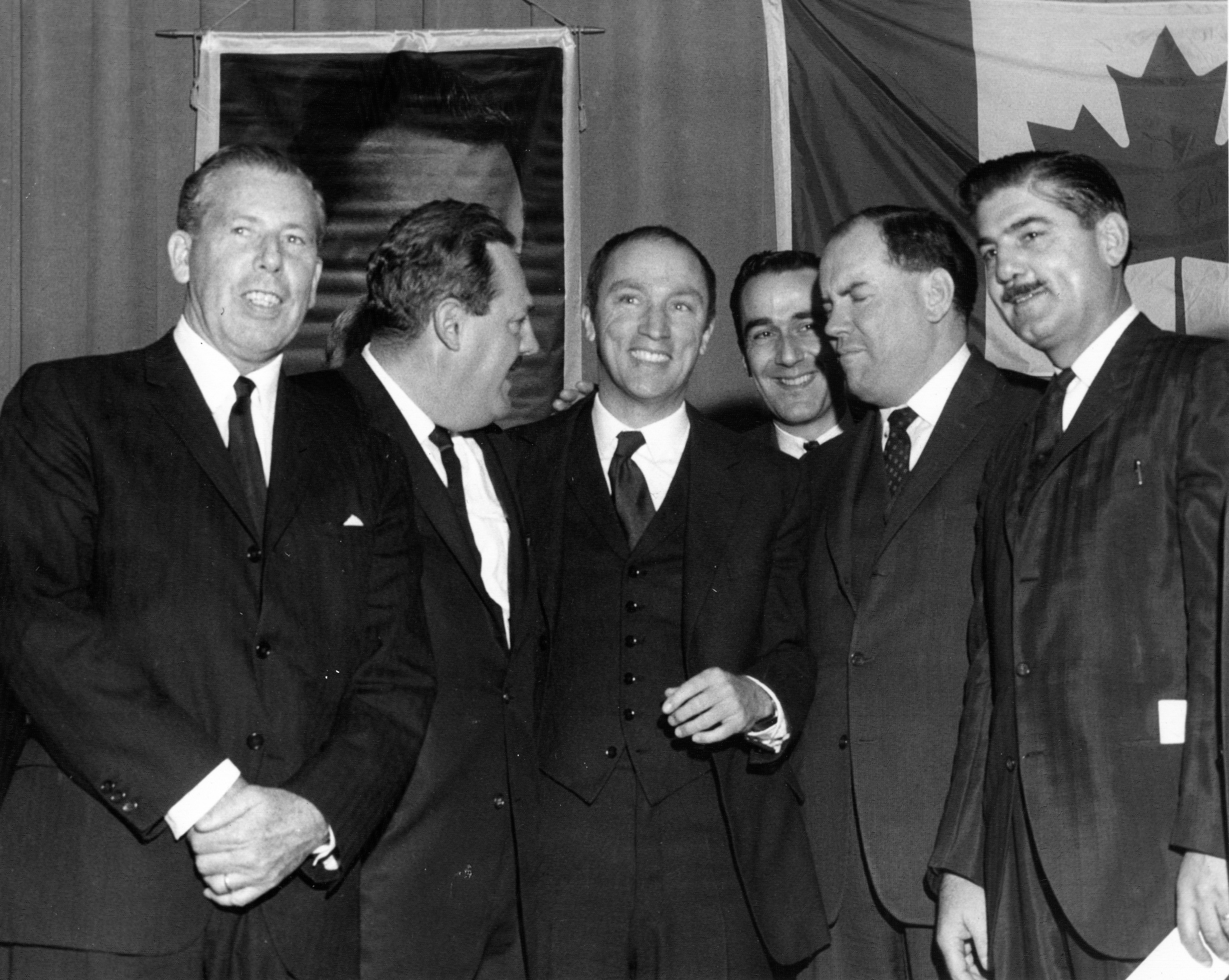
Trudeau after being nominated to represent the riding of Mount Royal, June 6, 1965

In 1965, Trudeau joined the Liberal Party, along with his friends Gérard Pelletier and Jean Marchand. Dubbed the "three wise men" by the media, they ran successfully for the Liberals in the 1965 election. Trudeau himself was elected in the safe Liberal riding of Mount Royal in Montreal. He held this seat until his retirement from politics in 1984, winning each election with large majorities. His decision to join the Liberals rather than the CCF's successor, the New Democratic Party (NDP), was partly based on his belief that the federal NDP could not achieve power. He also doubted the feasibility of the NDP's centralizing policies and felt that the party leadership tended toward a "deux nations" approach he could not support.

Upon arrival in Ottawa, Trudeau was appointed as parliamentary secretary to Prime Minister Lester B. Pearson and spent much of the next year travelling abroad, representing Canada at international meetings and bodies, including the United Nations. In 1967, he was appointed to Pearson's Cabinet as Minister of Justice and Attorney General.

== Minister of Justice and Attorney General (1967–1968) ==
Omnibus bill
Trudeau speaking about his omnibus bill, famously saying "there's no place for the state in the bedrooms of the nation"

From left: future prime ministers Trudeau, John Turner and Jean Chrétien, and Prime Minister Lester B. Pearson in 1967

As Justice Minister and Attorney General, Trudeau was responsible for introducing the landmark Criminal Law Amendment Act, an omnibus bill whose provisions included, among other things, the decriminalization of homosexual acts between consenting adults, new gun ownership restrictions and the legalization of contraception, abortion and lotteries, as well as the authorization of breathalyzer tests for suspected impaired drivers. Trudeau famously defended the segment of the bill decriminalizing homosexual acts by telling reporters that "there's no place for the state in the bedrooms of the nation", adding that "what's done in private between adults doesn't concern the Criminal Code". Trudeau paraphrased the term from Martin O'Malley's editorial piece in The Globe and Mail on December 12, 1967. Trudeau also liberalized divorce laws and clashed with Quebec Premier Daniel Johnson, Sr. during constitutional negotiations.

=== Liberal leadership convention (1968) ===
Trudeau at the Liberal convention after winning the leadership

At the end of Canada's centennial year in 1967, Pearson announced his intention to step down, and Trudeau entered the race to succeed him as party leader and prime minister. His energetic campaign attracted widespread media attention and mobilized many young people, who saw Trudeau as a symbol of generational change. However, many Liberals still had reservations, given that he had only joined the party in 1965. During the convention, prominent Cabinet Minister Judy LaMarsh was caught on television profanely stating that Trudeau was not a Liberal.

Nevertheless, at the April 1968 Liberal leadership convention, Trudeau was elected leader on the fourth ballot, with the support of 51 percent of the delegates. He defeated several prominent and long-serving Liberals, including Paul Martin Sr., Robert Winters and Paul Hellyer.

== First premiership (1968–1979) ==
=== Swearing-in and subsequent election ===
As the new leader of the governing Liberals, Trudeau was sworn in as prime minister on April 20. He became the third French Canadian prime minister, after Wilfrid Laurier and Louis St. Laurent. Although the parliamentary term was not due to expire until November 1970, Pearson's government had almost fallen before the leadership contest could even take place after a tax bill was voted down in Parliament, leading to much confusion over whether this counted as a matter of confidence in the government. Governor General Roland Michener ultimately ruled that it did not, and the government subsequently won an actual confidence motion, but the incident made it clear that the minority government Trudeau had inherited would not realistically last the full parliamentary term, and that he would soon need to call an early election in order to win a parliamentary majority. Trudeau eventually called the election for June 25, 1968.

Trudeau's campaign benefited from an unprecedented wave of personal popularity called "Trudeaumania", which saw him mobbed by throngs of youths. His main national opponents were PC leader Robert Stanfield and NDP leader Tommy Douglas, both popular figures who had been premiers of Nova Scotia and Saskatchewan, respectively. In Trudeau's native Quebec, however, the Liberals' main competition came from the Ralliement créditiste, led by Réal Caouette. As a candidate, Trudeau espoused participatory democracy as a means of making Canada a "Just Society". He vigorously defended the newly implemented universal health care and regional development programs, as well as the recent reforms found in the omnibus bill.

On the eve of the election, during the annual Saint-Jean-Baptiste Day parade in Montreal, rioting Quebec sovereigntists threw rocks and bottles at the grandstand where Trudeau was seated, chanting "Trudeau au poteau!" ("Trudeau to the stake!"). Rejecting the pleas of aides that he take cover, Trudeau stayed in his seat, facing the rioters. Images of Trudeau facing the protesters attracted public attention. The next day, Trudeau handily won the 1968 election with a strong majority government; this was the Liberals' first majority since 1953.

=== Social policy ===
==== Bilingualism and multiculturalism ====
Trudeau's first major legislative push was implementing the majority of recommendations from Pearson's Royal Commission on Bilingualism and Biculturalism via the Official Languages Act, which made French and English equal official languages of the federal government. More controversial than the declaration (which was backed by the NDP and, with some opposition in caucus, the PCs) was the implementation of the Act's principles: between 1966 and 1976, the francophone proportion of the civil service and military doubled, causing alarm in some sections of anglophone Canada who felt they were being disadvantaged.

Trudeau's Cabinet fulfilled Part IV of the Royal Commission's report by announcing a "Multiculturalism Policy" on October 8, 1971. It was the first of its kind in the world. Similar policies were subsequently adopted by several provinces, including Alberta, Saskatchewan, and Manitoba, as well as other countries, notably Australia. Beyond the specifics of the policy itself, this action signalled an openness to the world and coincided with a more open immigration policy that Pearson had brought in. The policy acknowledged both Canada's two official languages and its plurality of cultures – "a multicultural policy within a bilingual framework". This drew criticism in Quebec from those who believed that it challenged Quebec's claim of Canada being a country of two nations.

==== Immigration ====
During Pierre Trudeau's time as prime minister, Canada's immigration levels were much lower and more stable, with total arrivals often in the tens of thousands annually. The period between 1968 and 1975 averaged over 165,000 newcomers annually, with a peak of 218,500 immigrants in 1974. Due to a weakening economy, the numbers declined, averaging around 114,000 newcomers from 1976 to 1984. The government introduced official immigration quotas in the mid-1970s, with a target of 100,000 in 1979.

Following the Vietnam War, a refugee crisis was caused by the flight of the boat people from Vietnam, as thousands of people, mostly ethnic Chinese, fled the country in makeshift boats across the South China Sea, usually to the British colony of Hong Kong. The Trudeau government was generous in granting asylum to the refugees. By 1980, Canada had accepted about 44,000 boat people, making it one of the top destinations for them.

==== Indigenous issues ====
In 1969, Trudeau, along with his then-Minister of Indian Affairs Jean Chrétien, proposed the 1969 White Paper (officially entitled "Statement of the Government of Canada on Indian policy"). The white paper proposed the general assimilation of First Nations into the Canadian body politic through the elimination of the Indian Act and Indian status, the parcelling of reserve land to private owners, and the elimination of the Department of Indian and Northern Affairs. The White Paper was widely seen as racist and an attack on Canada's indigenous peoples, and prompted the first major national mobilization of indigenous activists against the federal government's proposal, leading Trudeau to set aside the legislation.

==== Death penalty ====
On July 14, 1976, after a long and emotional debate, Bill C-84 was passed by the House of Commons by a vote of 130 to 124, abolishing the death penalty for all criminal offences (other than military offences) and instituting a life sentence without parole for 25 years for first-degree murder.

=== Quebec ===
==== October Crisis ====
Trudeau's first serious test as prime minister came during the October Crisis of 1970, when a Marxist-influenced Quebec separatist group, the Front de libération du Québec (FLQ), kidnapped British Trade Consul James Cross at his residence on October 5. Five days later, the group also kidnapped Quebec Labour Minister Pierre Laporte. Trudeau, with the acquiescence of Quebec Premier Robert Bourassa, responded by invoking the War Measures Act, which gave the government sweeping powers of arrest and detention without trial. Trudeau presented a determined public stance during the crisis; when questioned by CBC Television journalist Tim Ralfe regarding how far he would go to stop the violence, Trudeau answered, "Just watch me". Laporte was found dead on October 17 in the trunk of a car. Five of the FLQ members were flown to Cuba in 1970 as part of a deal in exchange for James Cross' life, although they eventually returned to Canada years later, where they served time in prison.

Although Trudeau's response is still controversial and was opposed at the time as excessive by parliamentarians like Tommy Douglas and David Lewis, it was met with only limited objections from the public.

==== Quebec provincial affairs ====
After consultations with the provincial premiers, Trudeau agreed to attend a conference called by British Columbia Premier W. A. C. Bennett to attempt to finally patriate the Canadian constitution. Negotiations between the provinces and Justice Minister John Turner created a draft agreement, known as the Victoria Charter, that entrenched a charter of rights, bilingualism, and a guarantee of a veto of constitutional amendments for Ontario and Quebec, as well as regional vetoes for Western Canada and Atlantic Canada, within the new constitution. The agreement was acceptable to the nine predominantly English-speaking provinces, but Quebec Premier Robert Bourassa requested two weeks to consult with his cabinet. After a strong backlash of popular opinion against the agreement in Quebec, Bourassa stated that Quebec would not accept it.

Trudeau faced increasing challenges in Quebec, starting with bitter relations with Bourassa and his Quebec Liberal government. Following a rise in the polls after the rejection of the Victoria Charter, the Quebec Liberals had taken a more confrontational approach with the federal government on the constitution, French language laws, and the language of air traffic control in Quebec. Trudeau responded with increasing anger at what he saw as nationalist provocations against Ottawa's bilingualism and constitutional initiatives, at times expressing his personal contempt for Bourassa.

Partially in an attempt to shore up his support, Bourassa called a surprise election in 1976 that resulted in René Lévesque and the sovereigntist Parti Québécois (PQ) winning a majority government. The PQ had chiefly campaigned on a "good government" platform, but promised a referendum on independence to be held during their first term. Trudeau and Lévesque had been personal rivals, with Trudeau's intellectualism contrasting with Lévesque's more working-class image. While Trudeau claimed to welcome the "clarity" provided by the PQ victory, the unexpected rise of the Quebec sovereignty movement became, in his view, his biggest challenge.

As the PQ began to take power, Trudeau faced the prolonged breakdown of his marriage, which the English-language press covered in lurid detail on a day-by-day basis. Trudeau's reserve was seen as dignified by contemporaries, and his poll numbers actually rose during the height of coverage, but aides felt the personal tensions left him uncharacteristically emotional and prone to outbursts.

=== Economic policy ===
Trudeau's first government implemented many procedural reforms to make Parliament and the Liberal caucus meetings run more efficiently, significantly expanded the size and role of the prime minister's office, and substantially expanded social-welfare programs.

==== Deficit spending ====
Trudeau's government ran large budget deficits throughout its time in office. The government's first budget in 1968 produced a deficit of $667 million, while the 1969 budget produced a surplus of $140 million. However, the 1970 budget (which produced a deficit of over $1 billion) marked the start of consecutive budget deficits run by the Trudeau government; the budget would not be balanced until 1997. By the time Trudeau's first tenure ended in 1979, the deficit had grown to $12 billion.

List of budgets passed by the Pierre Trudeau government from 1968 to 1979 Figures are in billions of Canadian dollars, unadjusted for inflation
Budget	1968	1969	1970	1971	1972	1973	1974	1975	1976	1977	Apr. 1978	Nov. 1978
Surplus		$0.14										
Deficit	$0.667		$1.016	$1.786	$1.901	$2.211	$2.225	$6.204	$6.897	$10.879	$13.029	$11.967

==== Social programs and spending ====
In 1971, Trudeau's government greatly expanded unemployment insurance, making coverage nearly universal as the proportion of the Canadian labour force covered jumped to 96 percent from 75 percent. The system was sometimes called the 8/42 system because workers had to work for eight weeks (at least 20 hours per week) and wait two weeks to receive benefits for the remaining 42 weeks of the year. This expansion also extended the UI program to include maternity, sickness, and retirement benefits, covered seasonal workers for the first time, and allowed mothers to receive up to 15 weeks of benefits if they had 20 or more insurable weeks. The reforms increased the maximum benefit period to 50 weeks, though the benefit duration was calculated using a complex formula depending on labour force participation and the regional and national unemployment rates. In 1977, the government simplified the benefit duration formula but introduced a variable entry requirement based on the unemployment rate in the applicant's region; the changes also mandated that workers in regions with low unemployment work twice as long to be eligible for benefits as workers in high unemployment regions.

In 1973, Trudeau's government amended the National Housing Act to provide financial assistance for new home buying, loans for co-operative housing, and low-interest loans for municipal and private non-profit housing. The amendments saw the introduction of the Rental Rehabilitation Assistance Program, which established that homeowners and occupants in low-income neighbourhoods could qualify for small grants to be used for home repairs. The amendments also introduced the Assisted Home Ownership Program, which allowed the Canada Mortgage and Housing Corporation (CMHC) to start providing grants and subsidized interest rates to low-income families (though in 1978 an amendment discontinued the provision of grant money to these families, which led to a high incidence of defaults and, in turn, required that the federal government provide financial assistance to the CMHC). The amendments also provided for the Rent Supplement Act, which enabled the CMHC to partner with private landlords, cooperatives, and not-for-profit associations to provide affordable housing; in addition, the act saw the CMHC agreed to fund the difference between market rental prices and rent rates geared to the occupant's income. Lastly, the Canada Rental Supply Program was introduced to provide interest-free loans for 15 years to developers who agreed to allocate a proportion of units toward social housing initiatives. To ensure that loans contributed to the provision of low-income housing, the CMHC was restricted to giving loans amounting to $7,500 or less per unit.

Legislation passed in November 1968 widened eligibility for farm credit, and in 1970 legislation was introduced aimed at improving compensation for merchant seamen and to establish a right to maternity leave. In 1972, an act was passed providing for the indexation of various pensions and allowances to the consumer price index. Certain eligibility requirements for receiving training allowances were also removed. One-pensioner couples benefited from a new Spouse's Allowance, while various improvements in superannuation arrangements and in family allowances were also carried out.

The registered home ownership savings plan (RHOSP) was introduced in the government's November 1974 budget. Similar to RRSPs, RHOSP funds could be withdrawn tax-free for either a down payment on an owner-occupied dwelling or the purchase of furniture for the dwelling (or the spouse's dwelling). Individuals who already owned a home (either owner-occupied or rented to another person) could not deduct RHOSP contributions. In 1976, Trudeau's government allowed for transfers of funds between RHOSPs (for instance, to select a plan with better returns). In 1977, the government tightened the rules of the RHOSP (the reforms removed the purchase of furniture from the list of uses allowed for tax-free use of RHOSP proceeds starting in 1978; disallowed deductible contributions for a taxpayer whose spouse owned a home; suspended tax-free rollover of RHOSP funds to an RRSP; and capped the lifetime of the RHOSP at 20 years).

In 1977, Trudeau's government established the funding arrangement known as Established Programs Financing to help finance the provincially run health care and post-secondary education systems through transfer payments of cash and tax points. This system lasted until 1995.

In 1979, Trudeau's government restructured family allowances by increasing the role of the tax system in child support and decreasing the role of family allowances. The government established an annual Refundable Child Tax Credit of $200 for families with incomes of $18,000 or less. As incomes increased above this level, benefits would be gradually reduced, disappearing completely at $26,000. Since the median income for families during this time was $19,500, the majority of families received some benefit from the new program.

==== Taxation ====
In 1969, Trudeau's first finance minister, Edgar Benson, introduced a white paper on tax reform that included tax deductions for child care and advocated shifting the tax burden from the poor to the wealthy. Measures to fulfill the latter proposal included a capital gains tax, which was severely criticized by corporate Canada and the business community (notably Israel Asper). The bill was debated in Parliament for over a year, with its more radical proposals being removed in parliamentary committee. The reforms were passed through the use of closure, with the capital gains tax (that had an inclusion rate of 50 percent) coming into effect on January 1, 1972, as prescribed by the 1971 budget. Also implemented in 1972 was the child care expense deduction, which allowed for a deduction of up to $500 per child. As Benson had now become a political liability, Trudeau replaced him with John Turner (who was seen as a "Business Liberal") in 1972.

In 1973, Trudeau's government fully indexed the personal income tax system (both the exemptions and the brackets) to match inflation. The indexation was made effective in 1974; during that year, inflation had jumped from six percent to double digits. The government also implemented three personal income tax cuts from 1973 to 1975.

==== Inflation ====
While popular with the electorate, Trudeau's promised minor reforms had little effect on the growing rate of inflation, and he struggled with conflicting advice on the crisis. In September 1975, finance minister John Turner resigned rather than implement wage and price controls. In December 1975, Trudeau reversed his earlier position and, with new finance minister Donald Macdonald, introduced wage and price controls by passing the Anti-Inflation Act, despite campaigning against them in the 1974 election. Amongst its many controls, it limited pay increases for federal government employees and employees in companies with over 500 workers to 10 percent in 1976, 8 percent in 1977, and 6 percent in 1978. The Act also established the Anti-Inflation Board, which oversaw the implementation of wage and price controls and had the ability to recommend decreases in prices of goods, wage cuts, and rebates to customers of various services. The breadth of the legislation, which touched on many powers traditionally considered the purview of the provinces, prompted a Supreme Court reference that upheld the legislation only on the grounds of an emergency requiring federal intervention under the British North America Act. During the annual 1975 Christmas interview with CTV, Trudeau discussed the economy, citing market failures and stating that more state intervention would be necessary. However, the academic wording and hypothetical solutions posed during the complex discussion led much of the public to believe he had declared capitalism itself a failure, creating a lasting distrust among increasingly neoliberal business leaders. The controls lasted until 1978, and the Anti-Inflation Board was dissolved in 1979.

==== Energy policy ====
On September 4, 1973, Trudeau requested that the Western Canadian provinces agree to a voluntary freeze on oil prices during the ongoing Arab oil embargo. Nine days later, the Trudeau government imposed a 40-cent tax on every barrel of Canadian oil exported to the United States to combat rising inflation and oil prices. The tax was equivalent to the difference between domestic and international oil prices, and the revenues were used to subsidize oil imports for Eastern refiners. The premier of oil-rich Alberta, Peter Lougheed, called the decision "the most discriminatory action taken by a federal government against a particular province in the entire history of Confederation." While revenues decreased for Western provinces (particularly Alberta) and for the petroleum industry, Trudeau's government subsidized Eastern consumers, drawing criticism in Alberta, which had gained control of its natural resources in 1930.

In the early 1970s, the petroleum industry was largely under foreign (mainly American) control; the recent discovery of oil in Alaska put corporate pressure on the Canadian Arctic, and Canada's energy sector was increasingly focused on North American rather than domestic needs. Trudeau's government initially rejected the idea of creating a nationalized oil company (which was perceived to secure supplies, improve revenue collection, and give governments better information on the global energy market), arguing it would be costly and inefficient. However, after the late 1973 oil crisis saw global oil prices quadruple, questions arose about whether Canada should continue importing oil. Though Canada also exported oil at times, Quebec and the Atlantic provinces were at risk of a cutoff of imports; as a result, Canada needed more information about its energy production potential. In late October 1973, Trudeau's government adopted a motion from the New Democratic Party (which the Trudeau minority government relied on for support) to establish a nationalized oil company. The Petro-Canada Act was passed in 1975 (under a Trudeau majority government), resulting in the creation of a new crown corporation, Petro-Canada. Petro-Canada was mandated to acquire imported oil supplies, take part in energy research and development, and engage in downstream activities such as refining and marketing. The corporation started with an initial $1.5 billion in capital and had preferential access to debt capital as "an agent of Her Majesty". Trudeau's government gave itself authority over Petro-Canada's capital budget and its corporate strategy, making the company its policy arm; the government also wanted the company to be mainly active on the frontiers (the oil sands, the Arctic, and the East Coast offshore areas) rather than Western Canada, where most Canadian oil is extracted. In 1976, Trudeau appointed his friend, Maurice Strong, to become the first chair of the company.

=== Foreign affairs ===
In foreign affairs, Trudeau kept Canada in the North Atlantic Treaty Organization (NATO), but often pursued an independent path in international relations.

Trudeau was the first world leader to meet John Lennon and his wife Yoko Ono on their 1969 "tour for world peace". Lennon said, after talking with Trudeau for 50 minutes, that Trudeau was "a beautiful person" and that "if all politicians were like Pierre Trudeau, there would be world peace". Diplomat John G. H. Halstead, who worked as a close adviser to Trudeau for a time, described him as a man who never read any of the policy papers submitted by the External Affairs department, instead preferring short briefings on the issues before meeting other leaders, and that Trudeau usually tried to "wing" his way through international meetings by being witty. Halstead stated that Trudeau viewed foreign policy as "only for dabbing", saying he much preferred domestic affairs.

==== NATO ====
In August 1968, the Trudeau government expressed disapproval of the Warsaw Pact invasion of Czechoslovakia, having the Canadian delegation at the United Nations vote for a resolution condemning the invasion, which failed to pass owing to a Soviet veto. However, Trudeau made it clear that he did not want an intensified Cold War as a result of the invasion, and worked to avoid a rupture with Moscow. In a speech in December 1968, Trudeau asked: "Can we assume Russia wants war because it invaded Czechoslovakia?".

In 1968–1969, Trudeau wanted to pull Canada out of NATO, arguing that the principle of mutual assured destruction (MAD) made a Soviet invasion of West Germany highly unlikely and, in his view, rendered NATO an expensive irrelevance. In March 1969, Trudeau visited Washington to meet President Richard Nixon. Although the meeting was very civil, Nixon came to intensely dislike Trudeau over time, referring to the prime minister in 1971 as "that asshole Trudeau". Nixon made it clear to Trudeau that a Canada that remained in NATO would be taken more seriously in Washington than a Canada that left NATO. Trudeau himself noted during a speech given before the National Press Club during the same visit that the United States was by far Canada's largest trading partner, saying: "Living next to you is in some way like sleeping with an elephant; no matter how friendly and even-tempered the beast, one is affected by every twitch and grunt".

The NATO question sharply divided the Cabinet. Diplomat Marcel Cadieux accused Trudeau of "not seeming to believe in the Soviet danger". As a diplomat, the devout Catholic Cadieux had served on the International Control Commission in 1954–55, where his experiences of witnessing the exodus of two million Vietnamese Catholics from North Vietnam to South Vietnam made him into a very firm anti-Communist. In late March 1969, Trudeau's cabinet was torn by debate as ministers divided into pro-NATO and anti-NATO camps, and Trudeau's own feelings were with the latter. Defence Minister Léo Cadieux threatened to resign in protest if Canada left NATO, leading Trudeau, who wanted to keep a French-Canadian in a high-profile portfolio such as the Department of National Defence, to meet Cadieux on April 2 to discuss a possible compromise. Trudeau and Cadieux agreed that Canada would stay in NATO, but drastically cut back its contributions, despite warnings from Ross Campbell, the Canadian member of the NATO Council, that the scale of the cuts envisioned would break Canada's treaty commitments. Ultimately, the fact that the United States would be more favourably disposed to a Canada in NATO and the need to maintain cabinet unity led Trudeau to decide, despite his own inclinations, to stay in NATO. After much discussion within the cabinet, Trudeau finally declared that Canada would stay within NATO on April 3, but would cut back Canada's forces within Europe by 50%. Canada's 50% reduction in its NATO contributions caused tensions with other NATO allies, with the British government of Prime Minister Harold Wilson publicly protesting the cuts.

==== United States ====
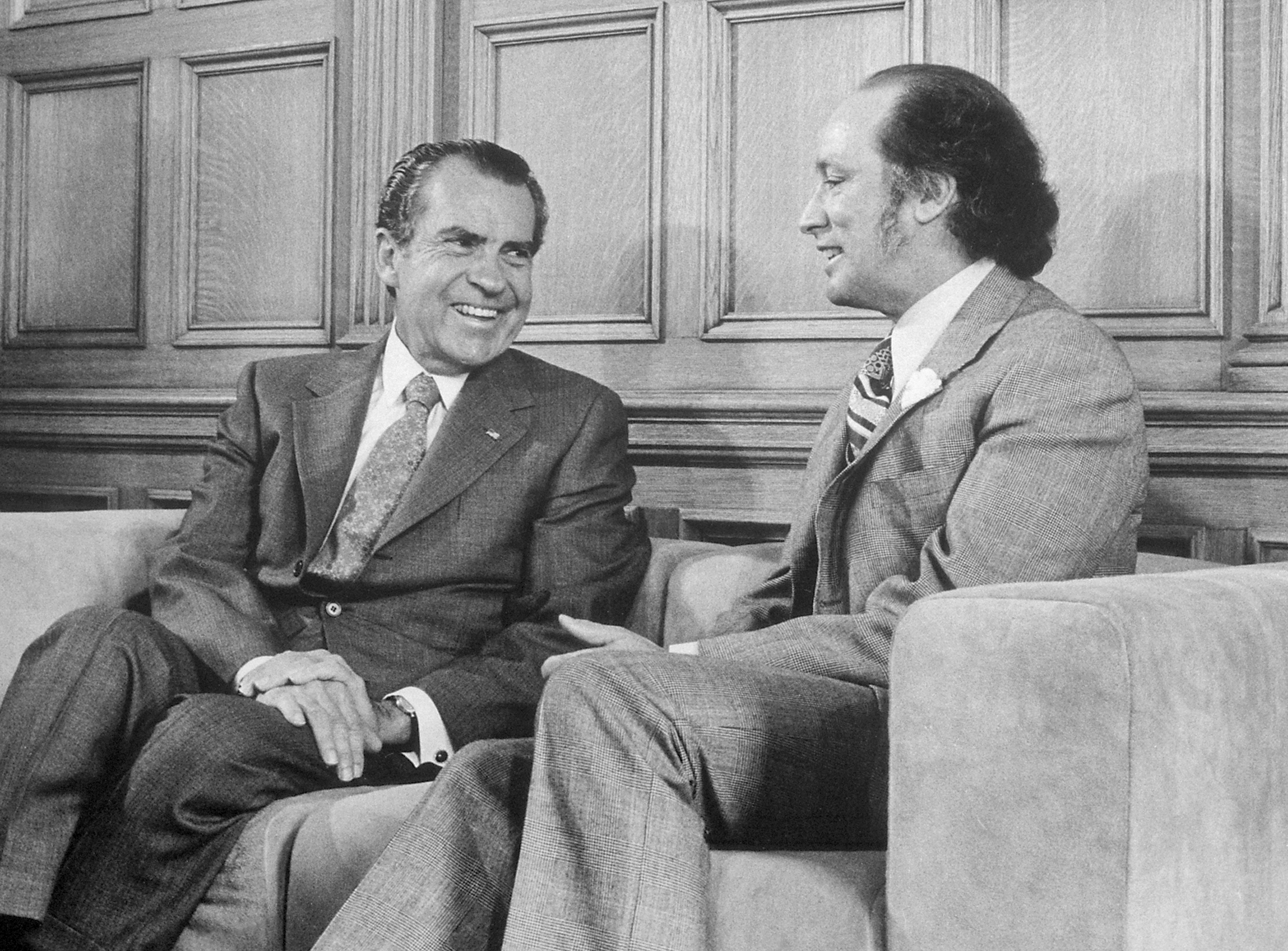
Trudeau in his office in Ottawa with U.S. President Richard Nixon on April 14, 1972

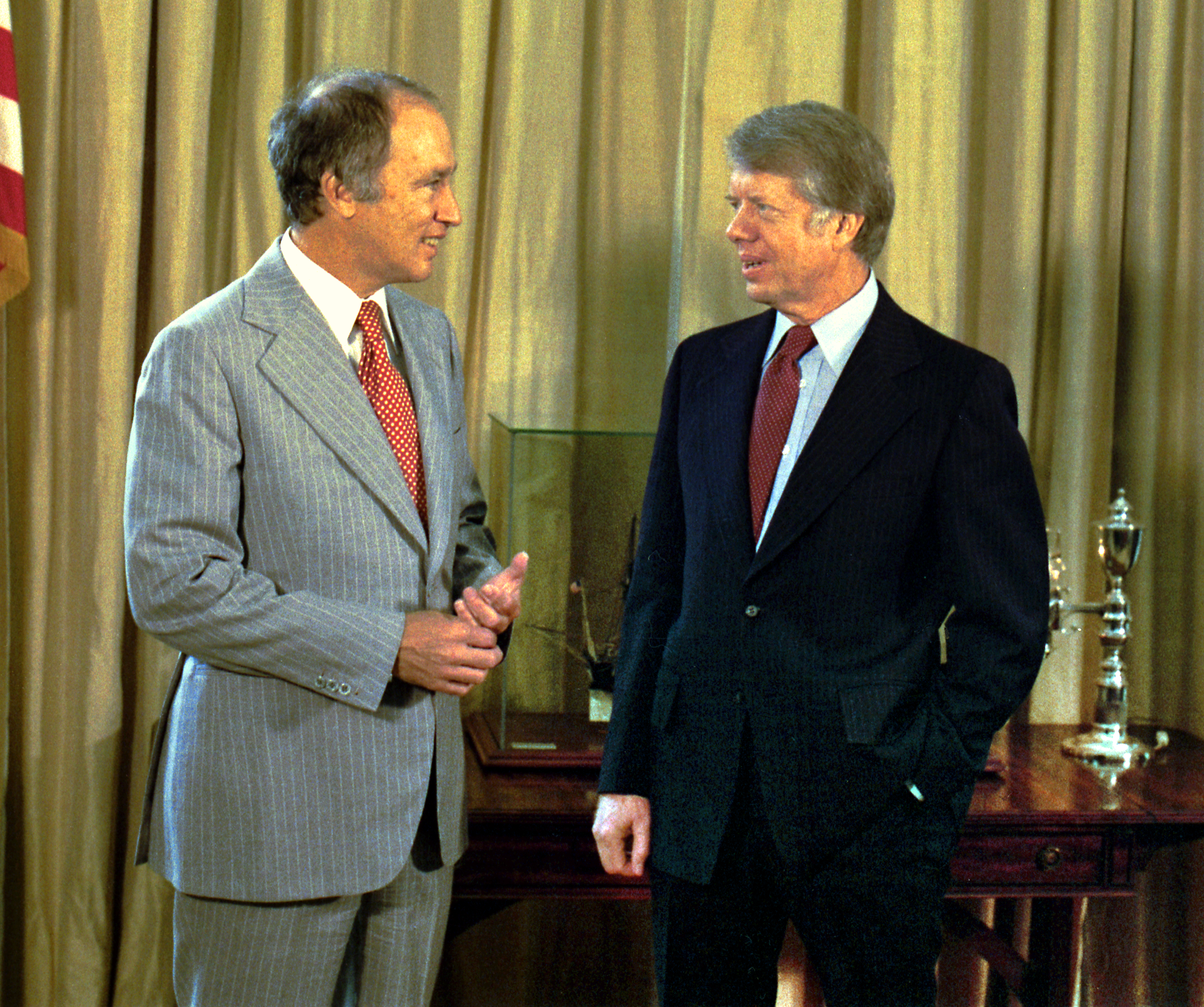
Trudeau with U.S. President Jimmy Carter in the Oval Office on September 9, 1977

Relations with the United States deteriorated on several fronts during the Nixon presidency (1969–74), including trade disputes, defence agreements, energy, fishing, the environment, cultural imperialism, and foreign policy. On January 4, 1973, Trudeau voted for a resolution in the House of Commons that condemned the American Christmas bombings against North Vietnam between December 18 and 29, 1972. As a consequence, Canadian-American relations, already under stress because of the mutual contempt between Nixon and Trudeau, reached a post-war nadir. Nixon was infuriated by the resolution and refused to see Marcel Cadieux, now the Canadian ambassador in Washington, in protest for the rest of 1973. Nixon was only prevented from lashing out more by his desire to have Canada continue as a pro-Western member of the International Control Commission for Vietnam. Prompted by Halstead, who was known as a proponent of economic "rebalancing" by seeking closer economic ties with the EEC, Trudeau made a visit to Brussels in October 1973 to see François-Xavier Ortoli, the president of the European Commission, to ask for a Canadian-EEC free trade agreement. Halstead used Nixon's displeasure with Canada as an argument that it was finally time for "economic rebalancing" by seeking closer ties with the EEC, a thesis that Halstead had been advocating ever since the early 1960s. Ortoli refused Trudeau's request for a free trade agreement with the EEC, saying that was out of the question, but did agree to open talks on lowering tariffs between Canada and the EEC.

Trudeau continued his attempts at increasing Canada's international profile, including joining the G7 group of major economic powers in 1976 at the behest of U.S. president Gerald Ford. American-Canadian relations changed for the better when Trudeau found a better rapport with Ford's successor, Jimmy Carter. The late 1970s saw a more sympathetic American attitude toward Canadian political and economic needs, the pardoning of draft evaders who had moved to Canada, and the passing of old sore points such as Watergate and the Vietnam War. Canada increasingly welcomed American investment during the "stagflation" (high inflation and high unemployment at the same time) that hurt both nations in the 1970s.

==== United Kingdom and France ====
Trudeau attached little importance to Canada–United Kingdom relations. While he rebuffed a suggestion by one of his ministers to turn Canada into a republic in 1968, he treated the Canadian monarchy with a certain bemused contempt. Britain's decision to join the European Economic Community (EEC) in 1973 and Japan's replacement of the UK as Canada's second-largest trading partner confirmed Trudeau's view that Britain was a declining power which had little to offer Canada. However, Trudeau was attached to the Commonwealth, believing it was an international body that allowed Canada to project influence on the Third World as it was one of the few bodies that allowed leaders from the First and Third Worlds to meet on a regular basis. Although France was no longer as supportive of Quebec separatism as it had been under President Charles de Gaulle in the 1960s, repeated expressions of the idea of a special Franco-Québécois bond as opposed to a Franco-Canadian bond by French politicians throughout the 1970s led to tensions between the two nations.

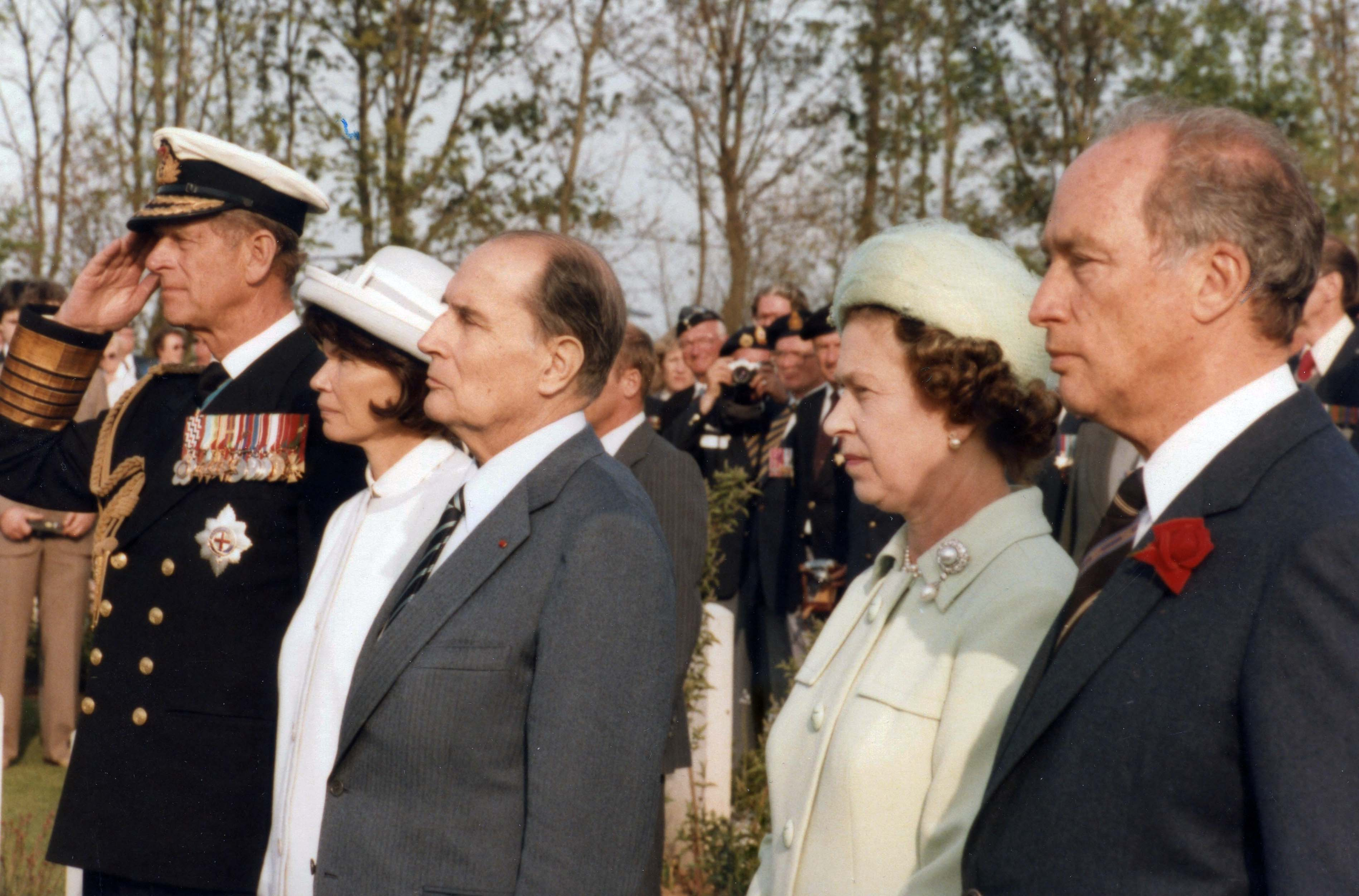
Trudeau, Queen Elizabeth II and French President François Mitterrand in France on June 6, 1984

In 1970, the Commonwealth was threatened with a split as a number of African members, supported by India, attempted to block planned British arms sales to South Africa, then under the system of apartheid. The Zambian government submitted a draft of principles which would have bound Commonwealth member states to give no assistance to nations practising racial discrimination. The first Wilson ministry had imposed an arms embargo on South Africa in 1964, which the Heath ministry ended in 1970 on the grounds that the South African government was pro-Western and anti-communist. A number of African Commonwealth nations led by Zambia and Tanzania threatened to leave the organization if the arms sales went through. When British prime minister Edward Heath visited Ottawa in December 1970, his meetings with Trudeau went poorly. In what was described as a "no holds-barred" style, Trudeau told Heath that the planned arms sales were threatening the Commonwealth's unity.

At a Commonwealth summit in Singapore in January 1971, Trudeau argued that apartheid was not sustainable in the long run given that Black South Africans vastly outnumbered white South Africans, and any external support for the apartheid government was myopic given that majority rule was inevitable. However, Trudeau worked for a compromise to avoid a split in the Commonwealth, arguing that it needed to do more to pressure South Africa to end apartheid peacefully, and saying that a race war in South Africa would be the worst possible way to end apartheid. The conference ended with a compromise agreement in which Britain would fulfil its existing arms contracts to South Africa but henceforth sell no more weapons to them; ultimately, the British only sold South Africa five attack helicopters. Singaporean prime minister and conference host Lee Kuan Yew later praised Trudeau for his efforts at the summit to hold the Commonwealth together, despite the passions aroused by the South African issue.

==== Germany ====
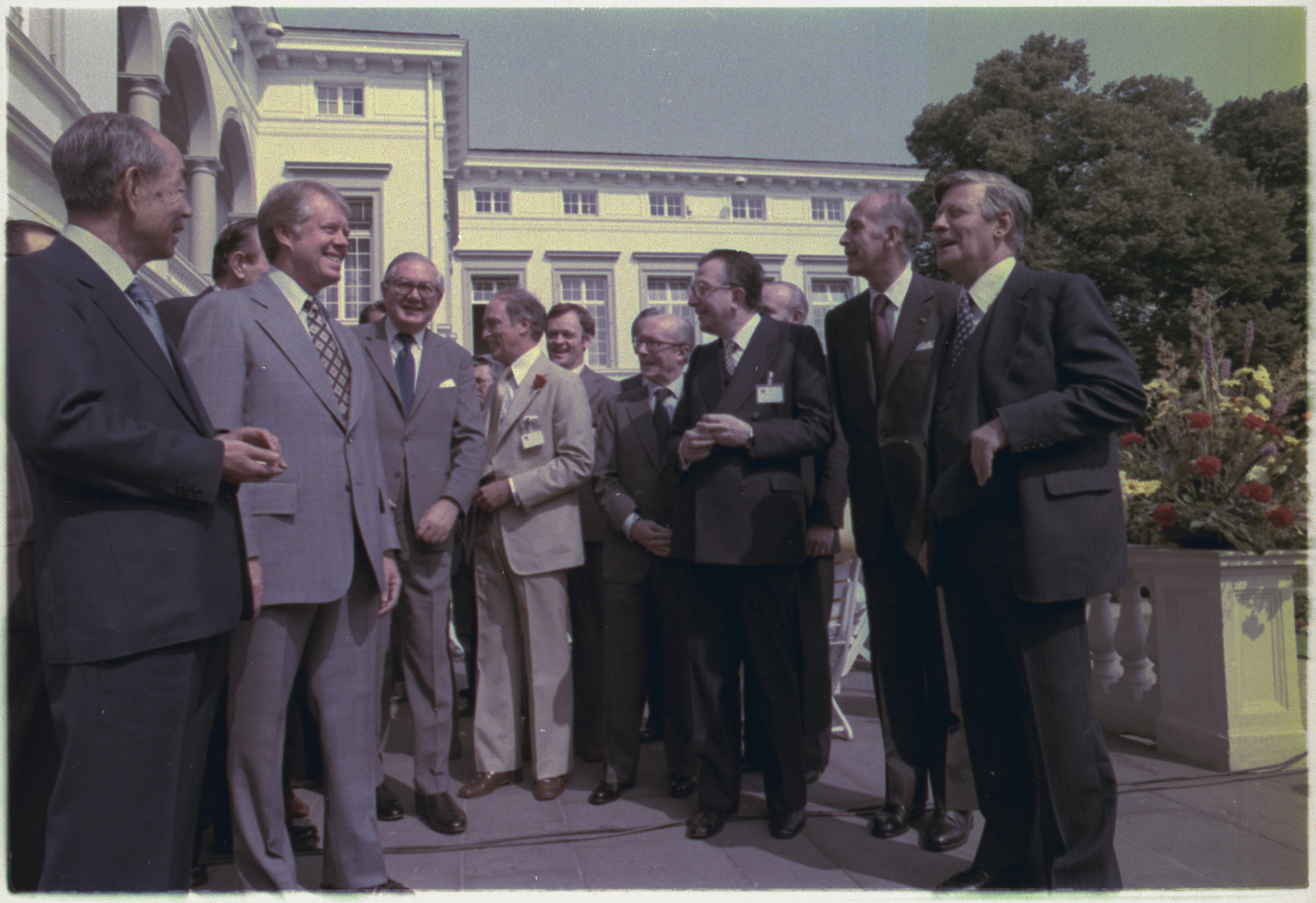
Trudeau with G7 leaders at the 4th G7 summit in Bonn, West Germany, 1978

Trudeau had an especially close friendship with the Social Democratic West German chancellor Helmut Schmidt, whom he greatly liked both for his left-wing politics and as a practical politician who was more concerned about getting things done rather than ideological questions. Schmidt was sympathetic towards Trudeau's "rebalancing" concept, telling Trudeau that he wanted West Germany to have two North American partners instead of one, and promised at a 1975 meeting to use West German influence within the EEC to grant Canada better trade terms in exchange for Canada spending more on its NATO commitments. After meeting Schmidt, Trudeau performed a volte-face on NATO, speaking at a press conference of how much he valued NATO as an alliance that was established for collective security in Europe. To show his approval of Schmidt, Trudeau not only agreed to spend more on NATO, but insisted that the Canadian Army buy the German-built Leopard tank, which thereby boosted the West German arms industry, over the opposition of the Finance department, which felt that buying the Leopard tanks was wasteful. Schmidt's support was especially welcome as Wilson, once again back as the British prime minister, proved unwilling to lobby for the EEC lowering tariffs on Canadian goods, merely saying that he was willing "to interpret Canadian policy" to the other EEC leaders. By contrast, the West German foreign minister Hans-Dietrich Genscher gave Trudeau a firm promise of West German support for an EEC-Canadian economic agreement. The major hold-out was France, which was stoutly opposed to an EEC-Canadian agreement, regarding EEC market access for Canadian agriculture as a threat to French agriculture. In July 1976, a Canadian-EEC Framework Economic Agreement was signed, which came into effect on October 1, 1976. Trudeau hoped the Framework Agreement would be the first step towards a Canadian-EEC free trade agreement, but the EEC proved to be uninterested in free trade with Canada.

==== China ====
Trudeau established Canadian diplomatic relations with the People's Republic of China in 1970 and became the first Canadian prime minister to make an official visit to Beijing. On February 10, 1969, the government announced its wish to establish diplomatic relations with the People's Republic, and Trudeau was mortified when the Chinese refused to respond at first, which made him look foolish. Unknown to Trudeau, the Chinese diplomatic corps had been so thoroughly purged during the Cultural Revolution that the Chinese Foreign Ministry barely functioned by early 1969. On February 19, 1969, the Chinese finally responded and agreed to open talks in Stockholm on establishing diplomatic relations, which began on April 3, 1969. Trudeau expected the negotiations to be a mere formality, but relations were not finally established until October 1970. The delay was largely because the Chinese insisted that Canada have no relations whatsoever with "the Chiang Kai-shek gang" as they called the Kuomintang regime in Taiwan and agree to support the Chinese position that Taiwan was a part of the People's Republic, a position that caused problems on the Canadian side as it implied Canadian support for China's viewpoint that it had the right to take Taiwan by force into the People's Republic. On October 10, 1970, a statement was issued by the External Affairs department in Ottawa saying: "The Chinese government reaffirms that Taiwan is an inalienable part of the territory of the People's Republic of China. The Canadian government takes note of the Chinese position". After the statement was issued, China and Canada established diplomatic relations on the same day. The so-called "Canadian formula" under which a nation "takes note" of the Chinese viewpoint that Taiwan is part of the People's Republic has often been copied by other nations that have established diplomatic relations with Beijing, most notably the United States in 1979. In October 1973, Trudeau visited Beijing to meet Chinese Communist Party Chairman Mao Zedong and premier Zhou Enlai, where Trudeau was hailed as "old friend", a term of high approval in China.

In 1976, Trudeau, succumbing to pressure from the Chinese government, issued an order barring Taiwan from participating as China in the 1976 Montreal Olympics, although technically it was a matter for the IOC. His action strained relations with the United States – from President Ford, future President Carter and the press – and subjected Canada to international condemnation and shame.

==== Cuba ====
Trudeau was known as a friend of Fidel Castro, the leader of Cuba. In January 1976, Trudeau visited Cuba to meet Castro and shouted to a crowd in Havana "Viva Cuba! Viva Castro!" ("Long Live Cuba! Long Live Castro!"). In November 1975, Cuba had intervened in the Angolan Civil War on the side of the Marxist MPLA government supported by the Soviet Union, which was fighting against the UNITA and FNLA guerrilla movements supported by the United States, South Africa and Zaire (the present-day Democratic Republic of the Congo). Although both Zaire and South Africa had also intervened in Angola, sending in troops to support the FNLA and UNITA respectively, it was the Cuban intervention in Angola that caused controversy in the West. Many people in the West saw the Cuban intervention as aggression and a power play by the Soviet Union to win a sphere of influence in Africa. Angola had substantial oil reserves, and many saw the victory of the MPLA/Cuban forces in the first round of the Angolan civil war in 1975–1976 as a major blow to Western interests in Africa. Trudeau's remarks in Havana were widely seen in the West as expressing approval not only of Cuba's Communist government, but also of the Cuban intervention in Angola. In fact, Trudeau did press Castro in private to pull his troops out of Angola, only for Castro to insist that Cuba would do so only when South Africa likewise pulled its forces out of not only Angola, but also South West Africa (modern-day Namibia). Trudeau's embrace of Castro attracted much criticism in the United States, which allowed Trudeau to appear as a leader who was "standing up" to the United States without seriously damaging American-Canadian relations.

=== Re-elections ===
==== 1972 election ====
On September 1, 1972, over four years into the Liberals' five-year mandate, Trudeau called an election for October 30. At the start of the campaign, polls showed the Liberals 10 points ahead of the Progressive Conservatives led by Robert Stanfield, who had previously lost to Trudeau in the 1968 election. However, the results produced a Liberal minority government, with the Liberals winning 109 seats compared to the PCs' 107; this was one of the closest elections in Canadian history. Trudeaumania from the 1968 election had worn off, not least because of a slumping economy and rising unemployment. The NDP, led by David Lewis, held the balance of power.

==== 1974 election ====
In May 1974, the House of Commons passed a motion of no confidence in the Trudeau government, defeating its budget bill after Trudeau intentionally antagonized Stanfield and Lewis. The ensuing election focused mainly on the then-ongoing recession. Stanfield proposed the immediate introduction of wage and price controls to help end the increasing inflation Canada was facing. Trudeau mocked the proposal, telling a newspaper reporter that it was the equivalent of a magician saying "Zap! You're frozen", and instead promoted a variety of small tax cuts to curb inflation. According to Trudeau's biographer John English, NDP supporters scared of wage controls moved toward the Liberals during the campaign.

The Liberals were re-elected with a majority government, winning 141 out of 264 seats, prompting Stanfield's retirement. However, the Liberals did not win any seats in Alberta, where Premier Peter Lougheed was a vociferous opponent of Trudeau's 1974 budget.

=== Defeat in 1979 ===
As the 1970s wore on, growing public weariness of Trudeau's personality and the country's constitutional debates caused his poll numbers to fall rapidly. At the 1978 G7 summit, he discussed strategies for the upcoming election with West German chancellor Helmut Schmidt, who advised him to announce several spending cuts to quell criticism of the large deficits his government was running.

After a series of by-election defeats in 1978, Trudeau waited as long as he could to call a general election in 1979. He finally did so, only two months from the five-year limit provided under the British North America Act. During the election campaign, the Liberals faced declining poll numbers, while the Joe Clark–led Progressive Conservatives focused on "pocketbook" issues. To contrast Trudeau's image with that of the mild-mannered Clark, Trudeau and his advisors based their campaign on Trudeau's decisive personality and his grasp of the Constitution file, despite the general public's apparent wariness of both. The traditional Liberal rally at Maple Leaf Gardens saw Trudeau stressing the importance of major constitutional reform despite general public apathy, and his campaign "photo-ops" were typically surrounded by picket lines and protesters. Though polls predicted disaster, Clark's struggles justifying his party's populist platform and a strong Trudeau performance in the election debate helped bring the Liberals to near parity in opinion polls.

Although the Liberal Party won the popular vote by four points, its vote was concentrated in Quebec and faltered in industrial Ontario. This allowed the PCs to win a plurality of the seats in the House of Commons and form a minority government.

== Opposition leader (1979–1980) ==
Trudeau soon announced his intention to resign as Liberal Party leader and favoured Donald Macdonald to be his successor. However, before a leadership convention could be held, with Trudeau's blessing and Allan MacEachen's manoeuvring in the House, the Liberals supported an NDP subamendment to Clark's budget stating that the House had no confidence in the budget. In Canada, as in most other countries with a Westminster system, budget votes are indirectly considered to be votes of confidence in the government, and their failure automatically brings down the government. Liberal and NDP votes and Social Credit abstentions led to the subamendment passing 139–133, thereby toppling Clark's government and triggering a new election less than a year after the House had been elected. The Liberal caucus, along with friends and advisors, persuaded Trudeau to stay on as leader and fight the election, with Trudeau's main impetus being the upcoming referendum on Quebec sovereignty.

Trudeau and the Liberals adopted a new strategy for the February 1980 election. Facetiously called the "low bridge" strategy, it involved dramatically underplaying Trudeau's role and avoiding media appearances, to the point of refusing a televised debate. On election day, Ontario returned to the Liberal fold, and Trudeau and the Liberals defeated Clark and won a majority government.

== Second premiership (1980–1984) ==
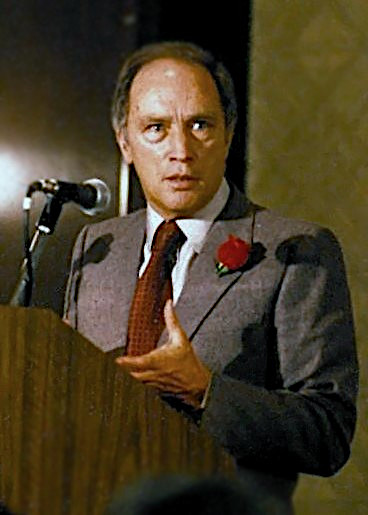
Prime Minister Trudeau in 1980

The Liberal victory in 1980 highlighted a sharp geographical divide in the country: the party had won no seats west of Manitoba. Trudeau, in an attempt to represent Western interests, offered to form a coalition government with Ed Broadbent's NDP, which had won 22 seats in the west, but was rebuffed by Broadbent out of fear the party would have no influence in a majority government.

=== 1980 Quebec referendum ===
The first challenge Trudeau faced upon re-election was the 1980 Quebec sovereignty referendum, called by the Parti Québécois government of René Lévesque. Trudeau immediately initiated federal involvement in the referendum, reversing the Clark government's policy of leaving the issue to the Quebec Liberals and Claude Ryan. He appointed Jean Chrétien as the nominal spokesman for the federal government, helping to push the "Non" campaign among working-class voters who had been unresponsive to Ryan and Trudeau. Unlike Ryan and the Liberals, he refused to acknowledge the legitimacy of the referendum question, and noted that the "association" required consent from the other provinces.

In the debates in the legislature during the campaign leading up to the referendum, Lévesque said that Trudeau's middle name was Scottish, and that Trudeau's aristocratic upbringing proved that he was more Scottish than French. A week prior to the referendum, Trudeau delivered one of his most well-known speeches, in which he extolled the virtues of federalism and questioned the ambiguous language of the referendum question. He described the origin of the name as Canadian. Trudeau promised a new constitutional agreement should Quebec decide to stay in Canada, in which English-speaking Canadians would have to listen to valid concerns made by the Québécois. On May 20, sixty percent of Quebeckers voted to remain in Canada. Following the announcement of the results, Trudeau said that he "had never been so proud to be a Quebecker and a Canadian".

=== Economy and oil ===
In the government's first budget, delivered in October 1980 by Finance Minister Allan MacEachen (a long-time Trudeau loyalist), the National Energy Program (NEP) was introduced. One of the Liberals' most contentious policies, the NEP was fiercely protested by the Western provinces and was seen as unfairly depriving them of the full economic benefit of their oil and gas resources, in order to pay for nationwide social programs and make regional transfer payments to poorer parts of the country. Sentiments of this kind were especially strong in oil-rich Alberta, where unemployment rose from 4% to 10% following passage of the NEP. The western provinces blamed the devastating oil bust of the 1980s on the NEP, which led to what many termed "Western alienation". Alberta premier Peter Lougheed entered into tough negotiations with Trudeau, reaching a revenue-sharing agreement on energy in 1982. Estimates have placed Alberta's losses between $50 billion and $100 billion because of the NEP.

This first budget was one of a series of unpopular budgets delivered in response to the oil shock of 1979 and the ensuing severe global economic recession which began at the start of 1980. In his budget speech, MacEachen said that the global oil price shocks— in 1973 and again in 1979 — had caused a "sharp renewal of inflationary forces and real income losses" in Canada and the industrialized world. He added, "They are not just Canadian problems ... they are world-wide problems." Leaders of developed countries raised their concerns at the Venice Summit, at meetings of Finance Ministers of the International Monetary Fund (IMF) and the Organisation for Economic Co-operation and Development (OECD). The Bank of Canada wrote that there was a "deeply troubling air of uncertainty and anxiety" about the economy.

Among the policies introduced during Trudeau's last term in office was an expansion of government support for Canada's poorest citizens. By the time Trudeau left office in 1984, the budget deficit was at $37 billion (fiscal year 1984–1985). Trudeau's first budget (fiscal year 1968–1969) had a deficit of $667 million. Inflation and unemployment marred much of Trudeau's tenure as prime minister. When Trudeau took office in 1968, Canada had a debt of $18 billion (24% of GDP) which was largely left over from World War II. When he left office in 1984, that debt stood at $200 billion (46% of GDP), an increase of 83% in real terms.

=== Patriation of the constitution ===
In 1982, Trudeau succeeded in patriating the Constitution. In response to a formal request from the Canadian Houses of Parliament, with the consent of all provinces except Quebec, the British Parliament passed an act ceding to the governments of Canada the full responsibility for amending Canada's Constitution. Earlier in his tenure, he had met with opposition from the provincial governments, most notably with the Victoria Charter. Provincial premiers were united in their concerns regarding an amending formula, a court-enforced Charter of Rights, and a further devolution of powers to the provinces. In 1980, Chrétien was tasked with creating a constitutional settlement following the Quebec referendum in which Quebeckers voted to remain in Canada.

After chairing a series of increasingly acrimonious conferences with first ministers on the issue, Trudeau announced the federal government's intention to proceed with a request to the British Parliament to patriate the constitution unilaterally, with additions to be approved by a referendum without input from provincial governments. Trudeau was backed by the NDP, Ontario Premier Bill Davis, and New Brunswick Premier Richard Hatfield, but opposed by the remaining premiers and PC leader Joe Clark. After numerous provincial governments challenged the legality of the decision using their reference power, conflicting decisions prompted a Supreme Court decision stating that unilateral patriation was legal but contravened a constitutional convention requiring consultation and general agreement with the provinces.

After the court decision, which prompted some reservations in the British Parliament of accepting a unilateral request, Trudeau agreed to meet with the premiers one more time before proceeding. At this meeting, Trudeau reached an agreement with nine of the premiers on patriating the constitution and implementing the Canadian Charter of Rights and Freedoms, with the caveat that Parliament and the provincial legislatures would have the ability to use a notwithstanding clause to protect some laws from judicial oversight. The notable exception was Lévesque who, Trudeau believed, would never have signed an agreement. The objection of the Quebec government to the new constitutional provisions became a source of continued acrimony between the federal and Quebec governments, and damaged Trudeau's reputation among nationalists in the province.

The Constitution Act, 1982, including the Canadian Charter of Rights and Freedoms, was proclaimed by Queen Elizabeth II, as Queen of Canada, on April 17, 1982. With the enactment of the Canada Act 1982, the British Parliament relinquished its remaining legislative authority over Canada. The Constitution Act, 1982, part of the Canada Act 1982, established the supremacy of the Constitution of Canada, which now could only be amended by the federal and provincial governments, according to the amending formula established by the Constitution Act, 1982.

The Charter represented the final step in Trudeau's liberal vision of a fully independent Canada based on fundamental human rights and the protection of individual freedoms as well as those of linguistic and cultural minorities. Section 35 of the Constitution Act, 1982 clarified issues of aboriginal and equality rights, including establishing the previously denied aboriginal rights of Métis. Section 15, dealing with equality rights, has been used to remedy societal discrimination against minority groups. The Charter's direct and indirect effects have extended into many aspects of Canadian life and the Charter's notwithstanding clause has been used infrequently.

=== Resignation ===
By 1984, the Progressive Conservatives held a substantial lead in opinion polls under their new leader Brian Mulroney, and polls indicated that the Liberals faced almost certain defeat if Trudeau led them into the next election.

On February 29, 1984, a day after what he described as a walk through the snowy streets of Ottawa, Trudeau announced he would not lead the Liberals into the next election. He was frequently known to use the term "walk in the snow" as a trope; he claimed to have taken a similar walk in December 1979 before deciding to take the Liberals into the 1980 election.

Trudeau formally retired on June 30, ending his 15-year tenure as prime minister. He was succeeded by John Turner, a former Cabinet minister under both Trudeau and Lester Pearson. Before handing power to Turner, Trudeau took the unusual step of appointing Liberal senators from Western provinces to his cabinet. He advised Governor General Jeanne Sauvé to appoint over 200 Liberals to patronage positions. He and Turner then crafted a legal agreement calling for Turner to advise an additional 70 patronage appointments. The sheer volume of appointments, combined with questions about the appointees' qualifications, led to condemnation from across the political spectrum. However, an apparent rebound in the polls prompted Turner to call an election for September 1984.

Turner's appointment deal with Trudeau came back to haunt the Liberals at the English-language debate, when Mulroney demanded that Turner apologize for not advising that the appointments be cancelled—advice that Sauvé would have been required to follow by convention. Turner claimed that "I had no option" but to let the appointments stand, prompting Mulroney to tell him, "You had an option, sir–to say 'no'–and you chose to say 'yes' to the old attitudes and the old stories of the Liberal Party." (Mulroney himself soon engaged in his own series of patronage appointments.)

In the election, Mulroney's PCs took slightly more than half the votes cast and 73 percent of the seats, winning the largest majority government (by total number of seats) and second-largest majority (by proportion of seats) in Canadian history. The Liberals, with Turner as leader, lost 95 seats – at the time, the worst defeat of a sitting government at the federal level (by proportion of seats).

== After politics (1984–2000) ==
Trudeau joined the Montreal law firm Heenan Blaikie as counsel and settled in the historic Maison Cormier in Montreal following his retirement from politics. Though he rarely gave speeches or spoke to the press, his interventions in public debate had a significant impact when they occurred.

Trudeau wrote and spoke out against both the Meech Lake Accord and Charlottetown Accord proposals to amend the Canadian constitution, arguing that they would weaken federalism and the Charter of Rights if implemented. The Meech Lake Accord granted Quebec the constitutional right to be a "distinct society" within Canada, which theoretically could have been the basis of a wide-ranging devolution of power to Quebec. The Quebec government could potentially have been allowed to pass any law short of secession to protect Quebec's constitutional right to be a "distinct society".

Trudeau claimed in his speeches that giving Quebec the constitutional status of a "distinct society" would lead to the Quebec government deporting members of Quebec's English-speaking minority. His opposition to both accords was considered one of the major factors leading to the defeat of the two proposals.

He also continued to speak against the Parti Québécois and the sovereignty movement with less effect.

Trudeau also remained active in international affairs, visiting foreign leaders and participating in international associations such as the Club of Rome. He met with Soviet leader Mikhail Gorbachev and other leaders in 1985; shortly afterwards Gorbachev met U.S. president Ronald Reagan to discuss easing world tensions.

He published his reminiscences in ''Memoirs'' in 1993. The book sold hundreds of thousands of copies in several editions, and became one of the most successful Canadian books ever published.

In his old age, Trudeau was afflicted with Parkinson's disease and prostate cancer, and became less active, although he continued to work at his law practice until a few months before his death at the age of 80. He was devastated by the death of his youngest son, Michel Trudeau, who was killed in an avalanche on November 13, 1998.

== Death and funeral ==
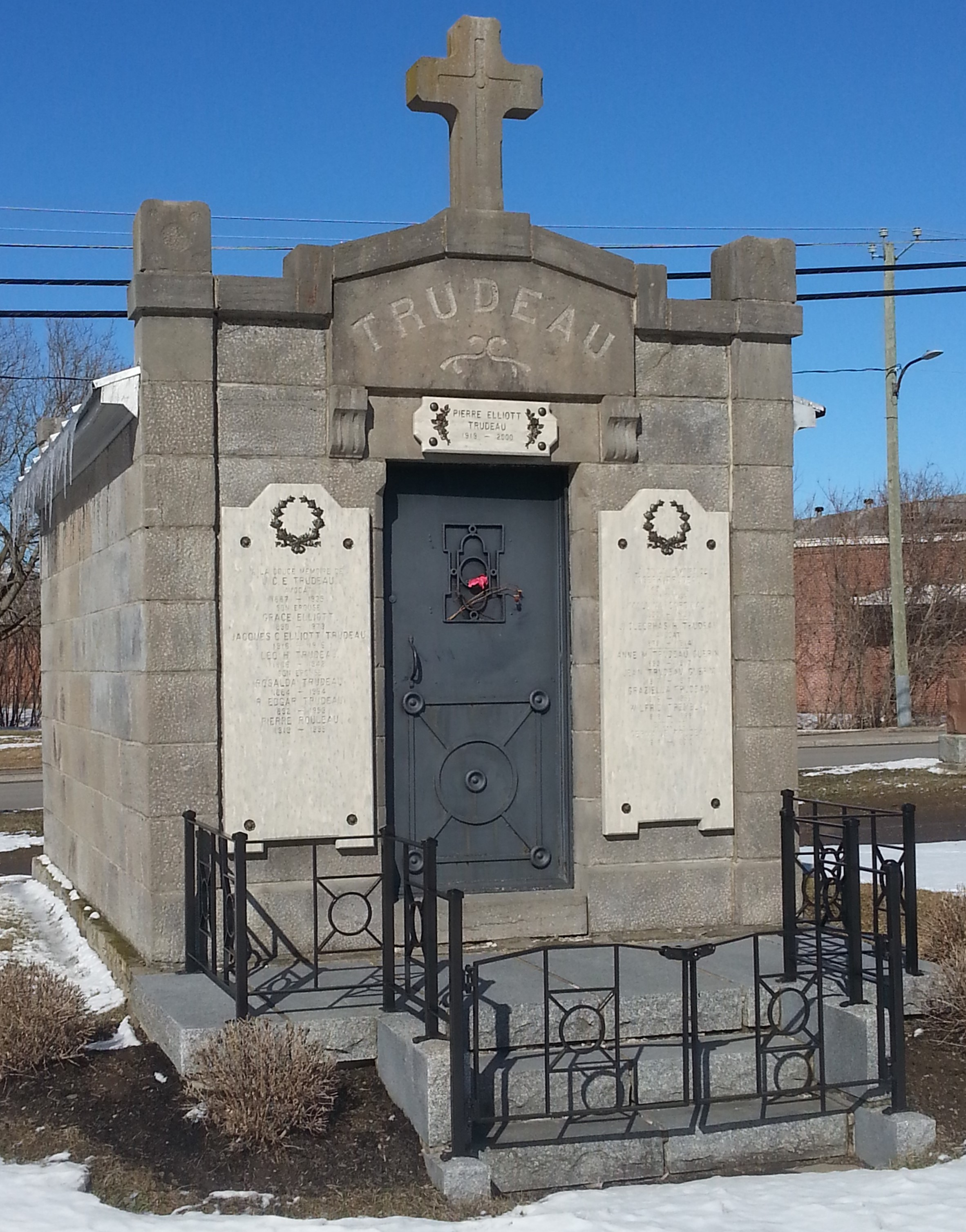
Trudeau family mausoleum

Trudeau succumbed to several health complications at his Montreal home on September 28, 2000. His death has been attributed to his prostate cancer, Parkinson's disease, a prior battle with pneumonia, as well as the depression felt following his son's death in 1998. At the time of his death, he was surrounded by Margaret as well as his sons Justin and Sacha. He was 80 years old.

Following his death, Trudeau's casket lay in state in the Hall of Honour in the Centre Block on Parliament Hill from September 30 to October 1, 2000. His funeral took place on October 3, 2000, at the Notre-Dame Basilica in Montreal. Several world politicians, including U.S. president Jimmy Carter and Cuban leader Fidel Castro, attended the funeral. His son Justin delivered the eulogy during the state funeral, which led to widespread speculation in the media that a career in politics was in his future.

Pierre Elliott Trudeau was interred in the Trudeau family mausoleum at St-Rémi-de-Napierville Cemetery in Saint-Rémi, Quebec. At his family's request, the burial was private and attended only by immediate family and friends.

== Personal life ==
=== Religious beliefs ===
Trudeau was Catholic and attended Mass throughout his life. While mostly private about his beliefs, he made it clear that he was a believer, stating, in an interview with the United Church Observer in 1971: "I believe in life after death, I believe in God and I'm a Christian." Trudeau maintained, however, that he preferred to impose constraints on himself rather than have them imposed from the outside. In this sense, he believed he was more like a Protestant than a Catholic of the era in which he was schooled.

Michael W. Higgins, a former president of Catholic St. Thomas University, researched Trudeau's spirituality and found that it incorporated elements of three Catholic traditions. The first of these was the Jesuits, who provided his education up to the college level. Trudeau frequently displayed the logic and love of argument consistent with that tradition. A second great spiritual influence in Trudeau's life was the Dominican Order. According to Michel Gourgues, professor at Dominican University College, Trudeau "considered himself a lay Dominican". He studied philosophy under Dominican Father Louis-Marie Régis and remained close to him throughout his life, regarding Régis as "spiritual director and friend". Another element in Trudeau's spirituality was an appreciation for contemplation acquired from his association with the Benedictine tradition. According to Higgins, Trudeau was convinced of the centrality of meditation in a fulfilling life. Trudeau meditated regularly after being initiated into Transcendental Meditation by the Maharishi Mahesh Yogi. He took retreats at Saint-Benoît-du-Lac, Quebec and regularly attended Hours and Mass at Montreal's Benedictine community.

Although Trudeau was not publicly theological in the manner of Margaret Thatcher or Tony Blair, or evangelical in the manner of Jimmy Carter or George W. Bush, his spirituality, according to Michael W. Higgins, "suffused, anchored, and directed his inner life. In no small part, it defined him." Prior to his career in politics and evident shift towards religion and to practising Catholicism, Trudeau had been a secular humanist and worked as a board member of the Humanist Fellowship of Montreal until moving to Ottawa to become an MP in 1965.

=== Marriage and children ===
Described as a "swinging young bachelor" when he became prime minister, in 1968, Trudeau was reportedly dating Barbra Streisand in 1969 and 1970. Although the relationship was serious, there was no explicit marriage proposal, contrary to one contemporary published report.

On March 4, 1971, while prime minister, Trudeau quietly married 22-year-old Margaret Sinclair, who was 29 years younger, at St. Stephen's Catholic Church in North Vancouver.

Despite his publicized social life and nicknames such as "Swinging Pierre" and "Trendy Trudeau", Trudeau was an intense intellectual with robust work habits and little time for family or fun. As a result, Margaret felt trapped and bored in the marriage, feelings that were exacerbated by her bipolar depression, with which she was later diagnosed.

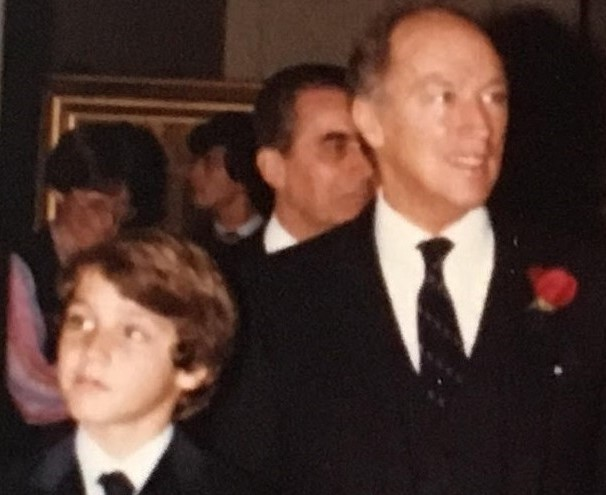
Trudeau's eldest son Justin (23rd Prime Minister of Canada) at the age of 10, touring the Palais des Beaux-Arts de Lille with his father on November 8, 1982

The couple had three sons: Justin (born 1971), later the 23rd prime minister of Canada, and Alexandre (born 1973). Both Justin and Alexandre were born on Christmas Day, two years apart. Their third son, Michel (1975–1998), died in an avalanche while skiing in Kokanee Glacier Provincial Park. Trudeau and Margaret separated in 1977, and were divorced in 1984. He was involved with guitarist Liona Boyd for eight years during this time.

When his divorce was finalized in 1984, Trudeau became the first Canadian prime minister to become a single parent as the result of divorce. In 1984, Trudeau was romantically involved with Margot Kidder (a Canadian actress famous for her role as Lois Lane in Superman: The Movie and its sequels) in the last months of his prime-ministership and after leaving office.

In 1991, Trudeau had his only daughter, Sarah, with Deborah Margaret Ryland Coyne. Coyne later stood for the 2013 Liberal Party of Canada leadership election and finished fifth in a poll won by Justin.

Trudeau began practising judo sometime in the mid-1950s when he was in his mid-thirties, and by the end of the decade, he was ranked ikkyū (brown belt). Later, when he travelled to Japan as prime minister, he was promoted to shodan (first-degree black belt) by the Kodokan, and then promoted to nidan (second-degree black belt) by Masao Takahashi in Ottawa before leaving office. Trudeau began the evening before his famous 1984 "walk in the snow" by practising judo with his sons.

== Intellectual contributions ==
Trudeau was a strong advocate for a federalist model of government in Canada, developing and promoting his ideas in response and opposition to growing Quebec nationalist movements, for instance, the social and political atmosphere created during Maurice Duplessis' time in power.

Federalism in this context can be defined as "a particular way of sharing political power among different peoples within a state...Those who believe in federalism hold that different peoples do not need states of their own in order to enjoy self-determination. Peoples ... may agree to share a single state while retaining substantial degrees of self-government over matters essential to their identity as peoples".

As a social democrat, Trudeau sought to reconcile his theories of social democracy and federalism so that both could find effective expression in Canada. He noted the ostensible conflict between socialism, with its usually strong centralist government model, and federalism, which advocated the division and sharing of power between the federal and provincial levels of government. In particular, Trudeau stated the following about socialists:

[R]ather than water down ... their socialism, must constantly seek ways of adapting it to a bicultural society governed under a federal constitution. And since the future of Canadian federalism lies clearly in the direction of co-operation, the wise socialist will turn his thoughts in that direction, keeping in mind the importance of establishing buffer zones of joint sovereignty and co-operative zones of joint administration between the two levels of government

Trudeau pointed out that in sociological terms, Canada is inherently a federalist society, forming unique regional identities and priorities, and therefore a federalist model of spending and jurisdictional powers is most appropriate. He argued, "in the age of the mass society, it is no small advantage to foster the creation of quasi-sovereign communities at the provincial level, where power is that much less remote from the people".

Trudeau's idealistic plans for a cooperative Canadian federalist state were resisted and hindered as a result of his narrowness on ideas of identity and socio-cultural pluralism: "While the idea of a 'nation' in the sociological sense is acknowledged by Trudeau, he considers the allegiance which it generates—emotive and particularistic—to be contrary to the idea of cohesion between humans, and as such creating fertile ground for the internal fragmentation of states and a permanent state of conflict".

This position garnered significant criticism for Trudeau, in particular from Quebec and First Nations peoples on the grounds that his theories denied their rights to nationhood. First Nations communities raised particular concerns with the proposed 1969 White Paper, developed under Trudeau by Jean Chrétien.

Trudeau and Quebec federalist historian Fernand Ouellet, an admirer of Trudeau and Trudeauism, influenced each other's ideas and writings on the history of Quebec from an anti-nationalist perspective, although they never formed a personal friendship.

== Legacy ==
A statue of Pierre Trudeau in a park named after him.

Trudeau remains well regarded by many Canadians. However, the passage of time has only slightly softened the strong antipathy he inspired among his opponents. Trudeau's strong personality, contempt for his opponents and distaste for compromise on many issues have made him, as historian Michael Bliss puts it, "one of the most admired and most disliked of all Canadian prime ministers". "He haunts us still", biographers Christina McCall and Stephen Clarkson wrote in 1990. Trudeau's electoral successes were matched in the 20th century only by those of William Lyon Mackenzie King.

One everlasting effect of Trudeau's career is his contribution to Canadian nationalism. His tenure gave Canada a distinct shift as a nation-state rather than as a derivative of the British Commonwealth. His role in this effort, and his related battles with Quebec on behalf of Canadian unity, cemented his political position when in office, despite the controversies he faced—and remain among the more remembered parts of his term.

Many politicians still use the term "taking a walk in the snow", the line Trudeau used to describe how he arrived at the decision to leave office in 1984. Other popular Trudeauisms frequently used are "just watch me", the "Trudeau Salute", and "Fuddle Duddle".

Maclean's 1997 and 2011 scholarly surveys ranked him twice as the fifth best Canadian prime minister, and in 2016, the fourth best. The CBC's special on The Greatest Canadian saw him ranked as the third greatest Canadian of all time, behind Tommy Douglas and Terry Fox, from the over 1.2 million votes cast by watchers of the program.

=== Bilingualism ===
Bilingualism is one of Trudeau's most lasting accomplishments, having been fully integrated into the federal government's services, documents, and broadcasting (though not, however, in provincial governments, except for full bilingualism in New Brunswick and some French language service rights in Ontario and Manitoba). While official bilingualism has settled some of the grievances francophones had with the federal government, many francophones had hoped that Canadians would be able to function in the official language of their choice no matter where in the country they were.

However, Trudeau's ambitions in this arena have been overstated: Trudeau once said that he regretted the use of the term "bilingualism", because it appeared to demand that all Canadians speak two languages. In fact, Trudeau's vision was to see Canada as a bilingual confederation in which all cultures would have a place. In this way, his conception broadened beyond simply the relationship of Quebec to Canada.

=== Constitutional legacy ===
The Charter of Rights and Freedoms was one of Trudeau's most enduring legacies. It is seen as advancing civil rights and liberties and has become a cornerstone of Canadian values for most Canadians. Court challenges based on the Charter have been used to advance the cause of women's equality, establish French school boards in provinces with majority anglophone populations, and provide constitutional protection to English school boards in Quebec. Court actions under the Charter resulted in the adoption of same-sex marriage all across Canada by the federal Parliament.

=== Legacy in western Canada ===
Trudeau's posthumous reputation in the western provinces is notably less favourable than in the rest of English-speaking Canada, and he is sometimes regarded as the "father of Western alienation". To many westerners, Trudeau's policies seemed to favour other parts of the country, especially Ontario and Québec, at their expense. Prominent among these policies was the National Energy Program, which was seen as unfairly depriving western provinces of the full economic benefit from their oil and gas resources, to pay for nationwide social programs and make regional transfer payments to poorer parts of the country. Sentiments of this kind were especially strong in oil-rich Alberta. In British Columbia, Premier W. A. C. Bennett in 1970 argued that Trudeau's government is Quebec nationalist-oriented. He also implied that Quebec received special treatment from Ottawa as a result.

Two incidents involving Trudeau are particularly associated with Western alienation. During a visit to Saskatoon, Saskatchewan, on July 17, 1969, Trudeau met with a group of farmers who were protesting the Canadian Wheat Board. A common perception is that Trudeau dismissed the protesters' concerns with "Why should I sell your wheat?" – however, he had asked the question rhetorically and then proceeded to answer it himself. Years later, on a train trip through Salmon Arm, British Columbia, he "gave the finger" to a group of protesters through the carriage window – less widely remembered is that the protesters were shouting anti-French slogans at the train.

=== Legacy in Quebec ===
Trudeau's legacy in Quebec is mixed. Many credit his actions during the October Crisis as crucial in terminating the Front de libération du Québec (FLQ) as a force in Quebec, and ensuring that the campaign for Quebec separatism took a democratic and peaceful route. However, his imposition of the War Measures Act—which received majority support at the time—is remembered by some in Quebec and elsewhere as an attack on democracy. Trudeau is also credited by many for the defeat of the 1980 Quebec referendum.

At the federal level, Trudeau faced almost no strong political opposition in Quebec during his time as prime minister. For instance, his Liberal Party captured 74 out of 75 Quebec seats in the 1980 federal election. Provincially, though, Québécois twice elected the pro-sovereignty Parti Québécois. Moreover, there were not at that time any pro-sovereignty federal parties such as the Bloc Québécois. From the enactment of the Constitution Act, 1982 until 2015, the Liberal Party of Canada had not succeeded in winning a majority of seats in Quebec. He was disliked by the Québécois nationalists.

== In popular culture ==
Trudeau is a 2002 television miniseries that aired on CBC Television. It was written by Wayne Grigsby, directed by Jerry Ciccoritti, and featured Colm Feore in the title role.

A prequel, Trudeau II: Maverick in the Making, was released in 2005. The four-hour CBC production examines Trudeau's early life. Stéphane Demers performs in the role.

== Supreme Court appointments ==
Trudeau chose the following jurists to be appointed as justices of the Supreme Court of Canada by the governor general:

- Bora Laskin (March 19, 1970 – March 17, 1984; as chief justice, December 27, 1973)
- Joseph Honoré Gérald Fauteux (as chief justice, March 23, 1970 – December 23, 1973; appointed a puisne justice December 22, 1949)
- Brian Dickson (March 26, 1973 – June 30, 1990; as chief justice, April 18, 1984)
- Jean Beetz (January 1, 1974 – November 10, 1988)
- Louis-Philippe de Grandpré (January 1, 1974 – October 1, 1977)
- Willard Zebedee Estey (September 29, 1977 – April 22, 1988)
- Yves Pratte (October 1, 1977 – June 30, 1979)
- William McIntyre (January 1, 1979 – February 15, 1989)
- Antonio Lamer (March 28, 1980 – January 6, 2000)
- Bertha Wilson (March 4, 1982 – January 4, 1991)
- Gerald Le Dain (May 29, 1984 – November 30, 1988)

== Honours ==
According to Canadian protocol, as a former prime minister, he was styled "The Right Honourable" for life.

Ribbon	Description	Notes
	Order of the Companions of Honour (C.H.)	July 4, 1984
	Companion of the Order of Canada (C.C.)	Awarded on June 24, 1985; Invested on October 30, 1985
	Centennial Anniversary of the Confederation of Canada Medal	1967; As a Minister of the Crown and an elected Member of the House of Commons of Canada, the then-Honourable Pierre Trudeau, P.C., M.P., Q.C., was awarded the medal as a member of the Canadian order of precedence.
	Queen Elizabeth II Silver Jubilee Medal	1977; As the Prime Minister of Canada and an elected Member of the House of Commons of Canada, the Right Honourable Pierre Trudeau was awarded the medal as a member of the Canadian order of precedence.
	125th Anniversary of the Confederation of Canada Medal	1992; As a former Prime Minister of Canada, a member of Her Majesty's Privy Council for Canada and having been appointed to the Order of Canada, the Right Honourable Pierre Trudeau was awarded the medal as a member of the Canadian order of precedence.

Coat of arms of Pierre Trudeau

The following honours were bestowed upon him by the governor general or by Queen Elizabeth II:

- Trudeau was made a member of the Queen's Privy Council for Canada on April 4, 1967, giving him the style "The Honourable" and post-nominal "PC" for life.
- He was styled "The Right Honourable" for life on his appointment as prime minister on April 20, 1968.
- Trudeau was made a Member of the Order of the Companions of Honour (post-nominal "C.H.") in 1984.
- He was made a Companion of the Order of Canada (post-nominal "C.C.") on June 24, 1985.
- He was granted arms, crest, and supporters by the Canadian Heraldic Authority on December 7, 1994.

Other honours include:

- The Canadian news agency Canadian Press named Trudeau "Newsmaker of the Year" a record ten times, including every year from 1968 to 1975, and two more times in 1978 and 2000. In 1999, CP also named Trudeau "Newsmaker of the 20th Century". Trudeau declined to give CP an interview on that occasion, but said in a letter that he was "surprised and pleased". In informal and unscientific polls conducted by Canadian Internet sites, users also widely agreed with the honour.
- In 1983–84, he was awarded the Albert Einstein Peace Prize for negotiating the reduction of nuclear weapons and Cold War tension in several countries.
- In 2004, viewers of the CBC series The Greatest Canadian voted Trudeau the third greatest Canadian.
- Trudeau was awarded a 2nd dan black belt in judo by the Takahashi School of Martial Arts in Ottawa.
- Trudeau was ranked No. 5 of the first 20 Prime Ministers of Canada (through Jean Chrétien) in a survey of Canadian historians. The survey was used in the book Prime Ministers: Ranking Canada's Leaders by Jack Granatstein and Norman Hillmer.
- In 2009, Trudeau was posthumously inducted into the Q Hall of Fame Canada, a Canadian LGBT human rights hall of fame, for his pioneering efforts in the advancement of human rights and equality for all Canadians.

=== Honorary degrees ===
Trudeau received several honorary degrees in recognition of his political career.

Honorary degrees

Location	Date	School	Degree
Alberta	1968	University of Alberta	Doctor of Laws (LL.D.)
Ontario	1968	Queen's University	Doctor of Laws (LL.D.)
Sudan	1969	University of Khartoum	
North Carolina	1974	Duke University	Doctor of Laws (LL.D.)
Ontario	1974	University of Ottawa	Doctor of Laws (LL.D.)
Japan	1976	Keio University	Doctor of Laws (LL.D.)
Indiana	May 16, 1982	University of Notre Dame	Doctor of Laws (LL.D.)
Nova Scotia	1982	St. Francis Xavier University	
Quebec	November 5, 1985	McGill University	Doctor of Laws (LL.D.)
British Columbia	May 30, 1986	University of British Columbia	Doctor of Laws (LL.D.)
Macau	1987	University of Macau	Doctor of Laws (LL.D.)
Quebec	1987	Université de Montréal	
Ontario	March 31, 1991	University of Toronto	Doctor of Laws (LL.D.)

=== Memorials ===
==== Geographic locations ====
- British Columbia: Mount Pierre Elliott Trudeau, Premier Range, Cariboo Mountains

==== Schools ====
- Manitoba: Collège Pierre-Elliott-Trudeau, Winnipeg.
- Ontario: École élémentaire Pierre-Elliott-Trudeau, Toronto.
- Ontario: Pierre Elliott Trudeau French Immersion Public School, St. Thomas.
- Ontario: Pierre Elliott Trudeau High School, Markham.
- Ontario: Pierre Elliott Trudeau Public School, Oshawa.
- Ontario: Pierre-Elliott-Trudeau Catholic Elementary School, Ottawa.
- Quebec: Pierre Elliott Trudeau Public School, Blainville.
- Quebec: Pierre Elliott Trudeau Public School, Gatineau.
- Saxony-Anhalt, Germany: International Gymnasium Pierre Trudeau (private high school), Barleben.

==== Parks ====
- Ontario: Pierre Elliot Trudeau Park, Vaughan, Ontario; the park also has a statue of Trudeau.

==== Organisation ====
- Pierre Elliott Trudeau Foundation
- Montréal–Pierre Elliott Trudeau International Airport (YUL) in Dorval, Montreal (renamed January 1, 2004).

=== Order of Canada citation ===
Trudeau was appointed a Companion of the Order of Canada on June 24, 1985. His citation reads:

Lawyer, professor, author and defender of human rights this statesman served as Prime Minister of Canada for fifteen years. Lending substance to the phrase "the style is the man", he has imparted, both in his and on the world stage, his quintessentially personal philosophy of modern politics.

== Major biographies ==
In 1990, Stephen Clarkson and Christina McCall published a biography, Trudeau and Our Times, in two volumes. Volume 1, The Magnificent Obsession, was the winner of the Governor General's Award.

John English's The Life of Pierre Elliott Trudeau was published in two volumes: Volume I, Citizen of the World, 1919–1968 (2006) and Volume II: Just Watch Me, 1968–2000 (2009).

== In film ==
Through hours of archival footage and interviews with Trudeau himself, the 1990 documentary Memoirs traces Trudeau's life and career.

Trudeau's life was also depicted in two CBC Television mini-series. The first, Trudeau (2002, with Colm Feore in the title role), depicts his years as prime minister. Trudeau II: Maverick in the Making (2005, with Stéphane Demers as the young Pierre, and Tobie Pelletier as Trudeau in later years) portrays his earlier life.

The 1999 feature-length documentary by the National Film Board of Canada (NFB) entitled Just Watch Me: Trudeau and the '70s Generation explores the impact of Trudeau's vision of Canadian bilingualism through interviews with eight Canadians on how Trudeau's concept of nationalism and bilingualism affected them personally in the 1970s.

In the documentary mini-series The Champions directed by Donald Brittain, Trudeau was the co-subject along with René Lévesque.

In 2001, the CBC produced a full-length documentary entitled Reflections.

== Writings ==
- Trudeau, Pierre Elliott (1993). Memoirs. Toronto: McClelland & Stewart. ISBN 978-0-7710-8588-8.
- Axworthy, Thomas S.; —, eds. (1992). Towards a Just Society: The Trudeau Years. Toronto; New York: Penguin. ISBN 978-0-670-83015-2.
- Head, Ivan L.; — (1995). The Canadian Way: Shaping Canada's Foreign Policy, 1968–1984. Toronto: McClelland & Stewart. ISBN 978-0-7710-4099-3.
- Hébert, Jacques; — (1968). Two Innocents in Red China. Translated by Owen, I.M. Toronto: Oxford University Press.
- — (1996). Pelletier, Gérard (ed.). Against the Current: Selected Writings, 1939–1996. Toronto: McClelland & Stewart. ISBN 978-0-7710-6979-6. (À contre-courant: textes choisis, 1939–1996)
- — (1998). Graham, Rod (ed.). The Essential Trudeau. Toronto: McClelland & Stewart. ISBN 978-0-7710-8591-8.
- — (1974). The Asbestos Strike. Translated by James Boake. Toronto: James Lewis & Samuel. (Grève de l'amiante)
- — (1990). Johnston, Donald J. (ed.). Pierre Trudeau Speaks Out on Meech Lake. Toronto: General Paperbacks. ISBN 0-7736-7244-3.
- — (1970). Approaches to Politics. Toronto: Oxford University Press. ISBN 0-19-540176-X. Introd. by Ramsay Cook. Prefatory note by Jacques Hébert. Translated by I. M. Owen. from the French Cheminements de la politique.
- MacInnis, Joseph B. (1975). Underwater Man. Foreword by Pierre Trudeau. New York: Dodd, Mead & Company. ISBN 0-396-07142-2.
- — (1968). Federalism and the French Canadians. Introduction by John T. Saywell. Toronto: MacMillan of Canada.
- — (1972). Conversation with Canadians. Foreword by Ivan L. Head. Toronto, Buffalo: University of Toronto Press. ISBN 0-8020-1888-2.
- — (1972). The Best of Trudeau. Toronto: Modern Canadian Library. ISBN 0-919364-08-X.
- — (1987). Crenna, C. David (ed.). Lifting the Shadow of War. Edmonton: Hurtig. ISBN 0-88830-300-9.
- Gotlieb, Allan, ed. (1970). Human Rights, Federalism and Minorities. (Les droits de l'homme, le fédéralisme et les minorités). Toronto: Canadian Institute of International Affairs.

== See also ==
- History of the Quebec sovereignty movement – Timeline of events related to independence for a province of Canada
- Judo in Canada
- List of Canadian federal general elections
- List of prime ministers of Canada
- List of years in Canada
- Politics of Canada
- Prime Minister nicknaming in Quebec

== Notes ==
Parliament of Canada
Preceded by Alan Macnaughton	Member of Parliament for Mount Royal; 1965–1984	Succeeded by Sheila Finestone
Political offices
Preceded by Louis Cardin	Minister of Justice; 1967–1968	Succeeded by John Turner
Preceded by Lester B. Pearson	Prime Minister of Canada; 1968–1979	Succeeded by Joe Clark
Preceded by Joe Clark	Leader of the Opposition; 1979–1980	Succeeded by Joe Clark
Preceded by Joe Clark	Prime Minister of Canada; 1980–1984	Succeeded by John Turner
Party political offices
Preceded by Lester Pearson	Leader of the Liberal Party; 1968–1984	Succeeded by John Turner
Diplomatic posts
Preceded by Francesco Cossiga	Chairperson of the G7; 1981	Succeeded by François Mitterrand
