= Edgar Benson =

Canadian politician (1923–2011)

The Honourable Edgar Benson PC FCA
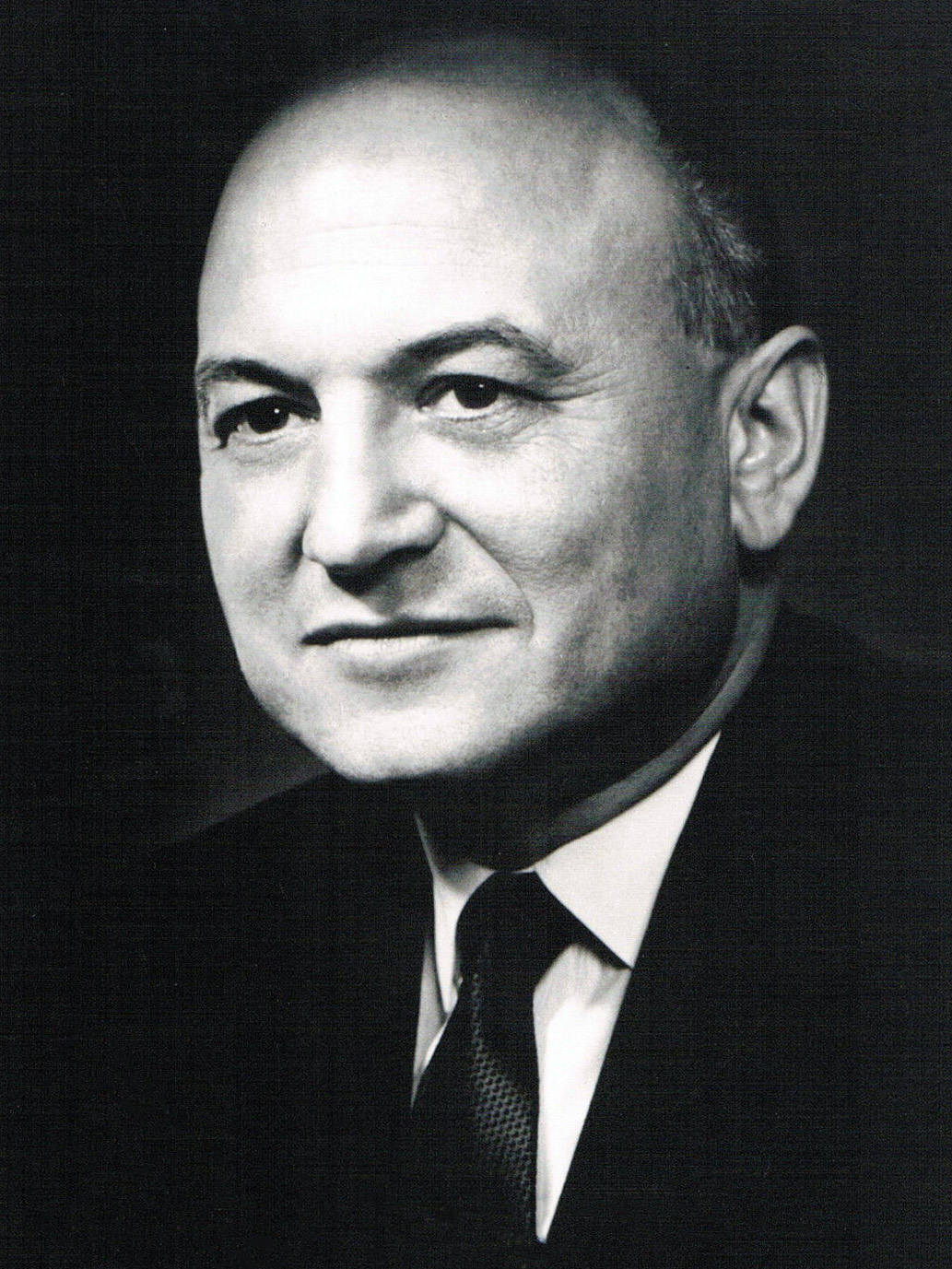
- Benson, c. 1968

Minister of National Defence
- In office January 28, 1972 – August 31, 1972
- Prime Minister: Pierre Trudeau
- Preceded by: Donald Macdonald
- Succeeded by: Jean-Eudes Dubé (acting)

Minister of Finance
- In office April 20, 1968 – January 28, 1972
- Prime Minister: Pierre Trudeau
- Preceded by: Mitchell Sharp
- Succeeded by: John Turner

President of the Treasury Board
- In office October 1, 1966 – July 5, 1968
- Prime Minister: Lester B. Pearson; Pierre Trudeau
- Preceded by: Position established
- Succeeded by: Charles Drury

Minister of National Revenue
- In office June 29, 1964 – January 17, 1968
- Prime Minister: Lester B. Pearson
- Preceded by: George McIlraith (acting)
- Succeeded by: Jean Chrétien

Member of Parliament for Kingston (1962–1968); Kingston and the Islands (1968–1972)
- In office June 18, 1962 – October 29, 1972
- Preceded by: Benjamin Graydon Allmark
- Succeeded by: Flora MacDonald

Personal details
- Born: Edgar John Benson; May 28, 1923 Cobourg, Ontario, Canada
- Died: September 2, 2011 (aged 88) Ottawa, Ontario, Canada
- Resting place: Beechwood Cemetery
- Party: Liberal
- Spouse(s): Marie Louise van Laer (1946–1974); Mary Jane Binks (1987–2011)
- Education: Queen's University
- Profession: Chartered Accountant

Military service
- Branch/service: Canadian Army
- Years of service: 1941–1946
- Rank: Sergeant
- Unit: 1st Survey Regiment, RCA; I Canadian Corps

Edgar John "Ben" Benson PC FCA (May 28, 1923 – September 2, 2011) was a Canadian politician, businessman, diplomat, and university professor. He held four cabinet posts, most notably that of Minister of Finance under Pierre Trudeau, where he was instrumental in reforming Canada's income tax law. He was described as "Pierre Trudeau's unflappable finance minister, the pipe-smoking financial wizard who raised the ire of corporate Canada in the 1970s by bringing in a capital gains tax."

== Early years ==
After serving overseas in the Second World War as a sergeant in the Royal Regiment of Canadian Artillery, Benson attended Queen's University in Kingston, Ontario, where he obtained his Bachelor of Commerce degree. He became a chartered accountant and partner in the accounting firm of England, Leonard, Macpherson and Company, and co-owner of CKLC. Prior to his entry into politics, he also taught Business Administration at Queen's, in the capacity of Assistant Professor of Commerce.

== Political life ==
He was first elected to the House of Commons of Canada in the 1962 general election as the Liberal Member of Parliament (MP) for Kingston, Ontario. Initially appointed in 1962 as Parliamentary Secretary to then Minister of Finance Walter Gordon, he entered the Cabinet of Prime Minister Lester Pearson in 1964 as Minister of National Revenue, and served concurrently from 1966 to 1968 as the first President of the Treasury Board.

He was an early supporter of Pierre Trudeau in the 1968 Liberal leadership campaign to replace the retiring Pearson, and, together with Jean Marchand, was co-chairman of Trudeau's leadership bid. He was later appointed Minister of Finance, serving from 1968 to 1972.

=== Tax reform (1971) ===
Benson's balanced budget for 1969-70 would be the last until Paul Martin's budget of 1997-98. Later in 1969, he introduced his white paper on Canadian tax reform, which paved the way for:

- a capital gains tax
- a tax deduction for child care as a means of helping mothers enter the workforce
- greater use of Registered Retirement Savings Plans

The proposals were subjected to intensive debate that lasted more than a year. Those concerning the capital gains tax were severely criticized by the business community, particularly Israel Asper, who condemned the measure. The reforms were only passed after significant amendment, and even then only through the use of closure. They came into effect on January 1, 1972, as prescribed by the 1971 Canadian federal budget.

Marc Lalonde, a colleague and future Finance Minister, later said, "He was in finance at a critical time, he revolutionized the system. He launched a revolution. It was a revolution, a necessary step and a demanding task. What he did was economically justified. The basic tax structure that he put in place is still alive. No one has really touched it since."

=== Impact ===
He was also instrumental in rolling out a national medical care plan and supplementary old age pensions and played a key role in federal-provincial relations.

Benson wore a pair of new shoes on budget day in 1968, although he said, "He didn't buy them just for the budget." The following year he did not wear new shoes when delivering the budget, saying jokingly that he couldn't afford them, and in 1970 proudly displayed his worn soles on budget day.

He later served as Minister of National Defence from January to August 1972, when he retired from politics, choosing not to run in the 1972 election.

== Later life and death ==
Benson served as President of the Canadian Transport Commission from 1972 to 1982, and as Canadian Ambassador to Ireland from 1982 to 1985. He died on September 2, 2011, at the age of 88.

== Honours ==
Benson was conferred honorary degrees as a Doctor of Laws from:

- Royal Military College of Canada in 1973
- Queen's University in 2008

== Electoral record ==
=== Kingston ===
1962 Canadian federal election: Kingston
Party	Candidate	Votes
Liberal	Edgar Benson	16,828
Progressive Conservative	Benjamin Allmark	13,599
New Democratic	John McKinnon	1,468
Social Credit	Ernest Hogan	214

1963 Canadian federal election: Kingston
Party	Candidate	Votes
Liberal	Edgar Benson	18,425
Progressive Conservative	J. Earl McEwen	12,879
New Democratic	Denis Kalman	2,400
Social Credit	Grace C.A. Gough	194

1965 Canadian federal election: Kingston
Party	Candidate	Votes
Liberal	Edgar Benson	16,022
Progressive Conservative	J. Earl McEwen	12,766
New Democratic	John Meister	3,530

=== Kingston and the Islands ===
1968 Canadian federal election: Kingston and the Islands
Party	Candidate	Votes	%
Liberal	Edgar Benson	16,234	49.7
Progressive Conservative	Boggart Trumpour	11,799	36.1
New Democratic	Brendan McConnell	4,636	14.2
Total valid votes		32,669	100.0

20th Canadian Ministry (1968–1979) – First cabinet of Pierre Trudeau
Cabinet posts (3)
Predecessor	Office	Successor
Donald Macdonald	Minister of National Defence; 1972	Jean-Eudes Dubé
Incumbent	President of the Treasury Board; 1968	Bud Drury
Mitchell Sharp	Minister of Finance; 1968–1972	John Turner
19th Canadian Ministry (1963–1968) – Cabinet of Lester B. Pearson
Cabinet posts (2)
Predecessor	Office	Successor
New	President of the Treasury Board; 1966–1968	Incumbent
George McIlraith	Minister of National Revenue; 1964–1968	Jean Chrétien
Sub-Cabinet Post
Predecessor	Title	Successor
Heward Grafftey	Parliamentary Secretary to the Minister of Finance (1963–1964)	Lawrence Pennell
Parliament of Canada
New constituency	Member of Parliament for Kingston and the Islands; 1968–1972	Succeeded by Flora MacDonald
Preceded by Benjamin Allmark	Member of Parliament for Kingston; 1962–1968	Redistribution
Government offices
Preceded by Jack Pickersgill	President of the Canadian Transport Commission; 1972–1982	Succeeded by John T. Gray
Diplomatic posts
Preceded by Alan William Sullivan	Canadian Ambassador to Ireland; 1982–1985	Succeeded by Gustav Gad Rezek
