= Ivan Head =

Canadian lawyer

Ivan Leigh Head OC QC
- Born: July 28, 1930; Calgary, Alberta
- Died: November 1, 2004 (aged 74); Vancouver, British Columbia
- Education: University of Alberta; Harvard Law School
- Known for: Diplomat, scholar and expert in international law
- Awards: Order of Canada

Ivan Leigh Head OC QC (July 28, 1930 – November 1, 2004) was a Canadian lawyer, legal scholar, and civil servant. He was an influential foreign policy adviser of Prime Minister Pierre Trudeau.

Born in Calgary, Alberta, he received a Bachelor of Arts degree in 1951 and a Bachelor of Laws degree in 1952 from the University of Alberta. He was called to the Bar of Alberta in 1953 and was created a Queen's Counsel in 1974. He practiced law in Calgary from 1953 to 1959. He was then awarded Harvard University's Frank Knox Memorial Fellowship and received a Master of Laws degree from Harvard Law School in 1960.

From 1960 to 1963, he was a foreign service officer with the Department of External Affairs working in Ottawa, Ontario, and Kuala Lumpur, Malaysia. In 1963, he was appointed an associate professor of law at the University of Alberta. He was appointed a full professor in 1967. In 1967, he was an associate counsel to Pierre Trudeau, the minister of justice, for constitutional matters. In 1968, he was the legal assistant to Prime Minister Pierre Trudeau. In 1970, he was named special assistant with special responsibility for advice on foreign policy and conduct of foreign relations.

From 1978 to 1991, he was the president of the International Development Research Centre. In 1991, he was appointed a professor of law at the University of British Columbia and was the founding director of UBC's Liu Institute for Global Issues.

He co-authored with Pierre Trudeau the book The Canadian Way: Shaping Canada’s Foreign Policy 1968–1984 (McClelland & Stewart, 1995, ISBN 0-7710-4099-7) and was the author of On a Hinge of History: The Mutual Vulnerability of South and North (University of Toronto Press, ISBN 0-8020-2766-0).

In 1990, he was made an Officer of the Order of Canada.

He was married to Ann and had four children. He died of cancer in Vancouver in 2004.

== Selected publications ==
- Head, Ivan L., ed. (1967). "This Fire-Proof House": Canadians Speak Out about Law and Order in the International Community. Dobbs Ferry, New York: Oceana Publications.
- Dawson, Frank Griffith; Head, Ivan L. (1971). International Law, National Tribunals and the Rights of Aliens. Syracuse, New York: Syracuse University Press. ISBN 978-0-8156-2152-2.
- Head, Ivan L. (1991). On a Hinge of History: The Mutual Vulnerability of South and North. University of Toronto Press. ISBN 0-8020-2766-0.
- Head, Ivan; Trudeau, Pierre (1995). The Canadian Way: Shaping Canada's Foreign Policy 1968–1984. Toronto: McClelland & Stewart. ISBN 0-7710-4099-7.
