= 1968 Canadian federal budget =

1968 Budget of the Canadian Federal Government
- Presented: 22 October 1968
- Country: Canada
- Parliament: 28th
- Party: Liberal
- Finance minister: Edgar Benson
- Total revenue: 12.320 Billion
- Total expenditures: 12.987 Billion
- Deficit: $667 million

The Canadian federal budget for fiscal year 1968–69 was presented by Minister of Finance Edgar Benson in the House of Commons of Canada on October 22, 1968. It was the first federal budget under the premiership of Pierre Trudeau.
