= 1970 Canadian federal budget =

1970 Budget of the Canadian Federal Government
- Presented: 12 March 1970
- Country: Canada
- Parliament: 28th
- Party: Liberal
- Finance minister: Edgar Benson
- Total revenue: 15.387 billion
- Total expenditures: 16.403 billion
- Deficit: $1.016 billion

The Canadian federal budget for fiscal year 1970–71 was presented by Minister of Finance Edgar Benson in the House of Commons of Canada on 12 March 1970.
