= 1969 Canadian federal budget =

1969 Budget of the Canadian Federal Government
- Presented: 3 June 1969
- Country: Canada
- Parliament: 28th
- Party: Liberal
- Finance minister: Edgar Benson
- Total revenue: 14.755 Billion
- Total expenditures: 14.615 Billion
- Surplus: $140 million

The Canadian federal budget for fiscal year 1969–70 presented by Minister of Finance Edgar Benson in the House of Commons of Canada on 3 June 1969. This was Canada's last balanced budget until Paul Martin's budget of 1997–98.
