= 1971 Canadian federal budget =

1971 Budget of the Canadian Federal Government
- Presented: 18 June 1971
- Country: Canada
- Parliament: 28th
- Party: Liberal
- Finance minister: Edgar Benson
- Total revenue: 17.119 billion
- Total expenditures: 18.905 billion
- Deficit: $1.786 billion

The Canadian federal budget for fiscal year 1971–72 was presented by Minister of Finance Edgar Benson in the House of Commons of Canada on 18 June 1971. The budget lowered income taxes on individual and corporations, and sale taxes on a variety of commodities. A Capital gains tax was also introduced to the Canadian tax code.

== Reception ==
The budget initially received mixed reviews. Spokespersons for all three opposition parties were displeased by the budget and criticized the lack of measures to counter unemployment. However, Progressive Conservative MP Robert Thompson responded especially favourably to the budget, praising its tax cuts.

A July 1971 Gallup opinion poll asked "Do you think the last federal budget, presented to parliament in mid-june will effect, in any direct way, the financial situation of yourself and your family?" 60% of respondents said "No" while 40% said "yes".

Do you think the last federal budget, presented to parliament in mid-june will effect, in any direct way, the financial situation of yourself and your family?
1. Yes will (40.0%)
2. No will not (60.0%)
