= Gérard Lachapelle =

Gérard Lachapelle is a Canadian geomatics engineer and Professor Emeritus (CRC/iCore Chair in Wireless Location) at the University of Calgary Schulich School of Engineering which he was instrumental in founding. He was named Fellow of the Institute of Electrical and Electronics Engineers (IEEE) in 2015 for "contributions to signal processing for global navigation satellite systems".

Lachapelle holds degrees from Laval University, the University of Oxford, the University of Helsinki and the Technical University at Graz. He and colleagues founded Calgary-based Nortech Surveys to develop GPS equipment and applications in the early 80s. Part of the company was later acquired by NovAtel Inc (now part of Hexagon), a high end GPS product manufacturer.

Lachapelle is co-author of several patents and hundreds of technical papers. He is also Fellow of the Royal Institute of Navigation, the Institute of Navigation, the International Association of Geodesy, the Royal Society of Canada and the Canadian Academy of Engineering. He received the coveted Johannes Kepler Award from the Institute of Navigation in 1997

Lachapelle is married to Elizabeth Cannon, the eighth president and vice-chancellor of the University of Calgary.
