= Qiao Sun =

Chinese-Canadian mechanical engineer

Qiao Sun is a Chinese and Canadian mechanical engineer whose research concerns the analysis, diagnosis, and control of vibrations in mechanical equipment ranging from the nanoscale of scanning probe microscopy to the macroscale of wind turbines. She is a professor in the Schulich School of Engineering at the University of Calgary, where she heads the Department of Mechanical and Manufacturing Engineering.

== Education and career ==
Sun received a bachelor's degree in power machinery engineering from Shanghai Jiao Tong University in 1982, specializing in diesel engines for ships. After a year working in a shipyard, she went back to Shanghai Jiao Tong University for a master's degree in mechanical engineering, completed in 1986. Her master's degree research concerned robotics, working on the control of the "Shanghai No. 1" arc-welding robot. Following this she continued at Shanghai Jiao Tong University as a lecturer and researcher in the university's Research Institute of Robotics.

She moved to Canada in 1992 to pursue a doctorate at the University of Victoria, which she completed in 1996. After working for eight months for the National Research Council Canada in Vancouver, she joined the faculty of the University of Calgary in 1996. She chaired the Schulich School's Gender and Diversity in Engineering Committee and served as senior associate dean for diversity and equity from 2014 to 2020 before taking her current administrative role as department head.

== Recognition ==
At the University of Calgary, Sun was named the professor of the year in the Department of Mechanical and Manufacturing Engineering in 2010 and 2014, and has won multiple awards for her teaching and mentorship.

She was named as an "Excellent Woman Mechanical Engineer" by the Canadian Society for Mechanical Engineering in 2014, and elected as a Fellow of the Canadian Academy of Engineering in 2021. The Association of Professional Engineers and Geoscientists of Alberta (APEGA) gave her their 2022 Women in Engineering & Geoscience Champion Award as part of the APEGA Summit Awards. She was the 2024 recipient of the Minerva Mentoring Award of the Alberta Women in Science Network.
