= Schulich =

Schulich may refer to:

== People with the surname ==
- Seymour Schulich, Canadian businessman and philanthropist

== Institutions ==
- Schulich School of Business, York University
- Schulich School of Engineering, University of Calgary
- Schulich School of Law, Dalhousie University
- Schulich School of Medicine & Dentistry, University of Western Ontario
- Schulich School of Music, McGill University
- Schulich School of Education, Nipissing University
