= Alberta Heart Institute =

Alberta Heart Institute may refer to:

- Libin Cardiovascular Institute of Alberta, Canada
- Mazankowski Alberta Heart Institute, Canada
