= Eldon Smith =

Canadian cardiologist

Eldon Smith OC FRCPC

Personal details
- Occupation: Cardiologist

Eldon R. Smith is a Canadian cardiologist who is the Chair of the Strategic Advisory Board of the Libin Cardiovascular Institute of Alberta (LCIA). He has been Dean of the Faculty of Medicine at the University of Calgary and President of both the Canadian Cardiovascular Society and the Association of Canadian Medical Colleges. Smith was appointed to the Board of Alberta Health Services.

Smiths is also Editor-in-Chief of the Canadian Journal of Cardiology. As of October 2006, Smith has been the Chair of the Canadian Heart Health Strategy and Action Plan, an initiative of the Government of Canada. Smith is also the President and Director of the Peter Lougheed Medical Research Foundation, a national initiative to support excellence in health research in Canada.

== Education ==
- Dalhousie University Medical School
- National Heart Institute, London, U.K.
- National Institutes of Health, Bethesda, Maryland

== Selected awards and honors ==
- Officer of the Order of Canada (2005)
- James Graham Award, Royal College of Physicians and Surgeons of Canada
- Young Investigator's Award, Canadian Cardiovascular Society
- Keon Achievement Award, University of Ottawa
- 125th Anniversary of Canada Commemorative Medal for Contributions to the Citizens of Canada
- Achievement Award, Canadian Cardiovascular Society
- Alumnus of the Year, Dalhousie University
- Certificate of Meritorious Service, Alberta College of Physicians and Surgeons
- Beamish Award for Leadership in Cardiovascular Science and Education, University of Manitoba
- Certificate of Recognition, Royal College of Physicians and Surgeons of Canada
- Order of the University, University of Calgary
- Citation from the Senate of the Philippines for aid in developing medical education in that country
- 2005 Medal of Service, Canadian Medical Association
- 2007 Outstanding Contribution to the Alberta Science and Technology Community
- 2013 Grant MacEwan Lifetime Achievement Award
