= LCIA =

LCIA may refer to:

- Libin Cardiovascular Institute of Alberta
- Licentiate of the Commonwealth Institute of Accountants
- London Court of International Arbitration
- Life Cycle Impact Analysis, phase of LCA aimed at evaluating the significance of environmental impacts
