= D. George Wyse =

Canadian cardiologist

Professor D. George Wyse FRCPC

Personal details
- Occupation: Cardiologist

D. George Wyse is the Chair of the International Experts Advisory Committee of the Libin Cardiovascular Institute of Alberta (LCIA). Wyse is a recognized and decorated international expert in the area of cardiac arrhythmias. His research led to fundamental changes in the way cardiac arrhythmias are treated, in specific, the reduction in use of certain antiarrhythmic agents.

== Education ==
Wyse obtained his PhD in Pharmacology in 1969 from McGill University in Montreal, Quebec, Canada and subsequently conducted two years of postdoctoral research at the University of New Mexico in Albuquerque, New Mexico. After his stint in the United States, Wyse returned to Canada, completing his MD training in 1974 at the University of Calgary. By 1978, Wyse had completed specialization training in internal medicine at the Foothills Medical Centre, also located in Calgary, followed by training in cardiology at Oregon Health Sciences University in Portland, Oregon.

== Research ==
Within the area of cardiac arrhythmia and antiarrhythmic agents, Wyse has played an integral role in some of the more defining trials over the last three decades. These trials include the Cardiac Arrhythmia Suppression Trial (CAST), the Antiarrhythmics Versus Implantable Defibrillators (AVID) Trial and the Atrial Fibrillation Follow-up Investigation of Rhythm Management (AFFIRM) trial. As a result of these trials and other research, Wyse has produced over 300 articles in his active research career. His legacy includes being a founding coordinator of the Medical Research Council of Canada's Program Grant in cardiac electrophysiology at the University of Calgary.

== Honors and awards ==
- Professor Emeritus, Faculty of Medicine, University of Calgary (2005)
- Distinguished Alumni, University of Calgary (2005)
- Distinguished Scientist, Heart Rhythm Society (2007)
- Top 40 Alumni, University of Calgary (2007)
- Annual Achievement Award (Canadian having made an outstanding contributions to the cardiovascular field during their careers), Canadian Cardiovascular Society (2008)
- 2017 Lecture of a Lifetime, University of Calgary
