= Alvin Libin =

Canadian businessman and philanthropist (1931–2026)

Alvin Libin

Alvin G. Libin OC AOE (April 22, 1931 – June 14, 2026) was a Canadian businessman and philanthropist. Based in Calgary, Libin was president and chief executive officer of Balmon Investments Ltd, a private management services and investment company, with interests primarily in hotels, nursing homes, oil and gas, real estate, and financial services.

== Background ==
Libin's parents, Norman and Ethel (née Shapiro), were Russian Jewish immigrants.

In 1953, Libin married the late Mona (Diamond). They had one son, Robert, and three grandchildren, Louis, Eda, and Nora. Mona Libin was a community activist in her own right, co-chairing the Partners in Health campaign that raised $51 million for the Calgary Health Region. Following kidney transplantation in 2004, Mona Libin eventually succumbed to pneumonia and died in 2006. Libin died on June 14, 2026, at the age of 95.

== Business interests ==
Founded in 1964, the International Hotel of Calgary was one of Libin's original key holdings. In its prime, the hotel had more than 100 employees and generated annual revenues of $7 million. In 2015, the hotel was sold for an undisclosed figure to Minto Properties, an Ottawa real estate firm.

In 1967, Libin co-founded Villacentres, a nursing home with only 150 beds. Today, that business has grown into Extendicare, with approximately 28,000 beds in Canada, USA, and UK. In 1984, Libin was appointed an independent director of Extendicare.

In 1993, Libin was appointed a director of the Crown Life Insurance Company, that ultimately was absorbed into Canada Life Financial.

== Sports interests ==
In 1994, Libin became one of five co-owners of the Calgary Flames. In 2012, the Calgary Flames Limited Partnership became majority and operating partner of the Calgary Stampeders. Subsequently, the Partnership was renamed as the Calgary Sports and Entertainment Corporation; it currently operates the Calgary Flames, Calgary Stampeders, the Scotiabank Saddledome, the Western Hockey League's Calgary Hitmen, the National Lacrosse League's Calgary Roughnecks, and the American Hockey League's Calgary Wranglers.

== Philanthropy ==
- Chairman of Board of Trustees, Calgary Foothills Hospital (1980–1990)
- President, Calgary Jewish Community Council
- Chairman, Alberta Heritage Foundation for Medical Research (1990–2000)
- Chairman, Community and Partners Advisory Committee, Libin Cardiovascular Institute of Alberta
- Building the Vision Campaign, University of Calgary (1990- 1993)
- Founding Chairman, Alberta Ingenuity Fund (2000–2006)
- Councilor, Junior Achievement of Southern Alberta Economic Futures Council (2013)

=== Alvin and Mona Libin Foundation ===
Founded in 1983, the Alvin and Mona Libin Foundation specializes in support of health organizations with a specific focus upon diseases.

In 2003, the foundation donated $15 million toward establishing the Libin Cardiovascular Institute of Alberta, thus providing Calgary a world-class institute for heart health research, education, and patient care. The unit is a partnership between Alberta Health Services and the University of Calgary. Its mandate comprises all cardiovascular research, education and service delivery, with a service area extending from Saskatchewan, Southern Alberta and Eastern British Columbia. The Institute coordinates the activities of 1,500 individuals in Southern Alberta. Of its approximately 150 research and clinician members, over 65 are cardiologists, making it the largest heart or cardiovascular institute in Western Canada by that measure.

The foundation further established two other notable entities: the Libin Gene Therapy Unit, which funds research to explore new therapies for heart disease, diabetes mellitus, arthritis and cancer, plus the Libin Lecture Theatre in the Heritage Medical Research Building at the University of Calgary.

=== Alvin and Mona Libin Scholarship in Medicine ===
Sponsored by the University of Calgary

== Awards ==
- Honorary Doctorate of Laws Degree, University of Calgary (1994)
- Officer of the Order of Canada (2001)
- Libin/AHFMR Prize for Excellence in Cardiovascular Research (2002)
- Alberta Order of Excellence (2004)
- ASTech Special Award (2006)
- Calgary Business Hall of Fame (2010)
- Queen Elizabeth II Diamond Jubilee Medal (2012)
- Medal of Honor, Alberta Medical Association (2015)
- CMA Medal of Honor, Canadian Medical Association (2016)
- Paul Harris Fellow, Rotary Club International
