= Elizabeth Cannon =

Elizabeth Cannon may refer to:

- Elizabeth Ann "Annie" Wells Cannon (1859–1942), Utah suffragist and politician
- M. Elizabeth Cannon (born 1963), Canadian engineer, academic, and university president
