= CJSW-FM =

Radio station at the University of Calgary in Calgary, Alberta

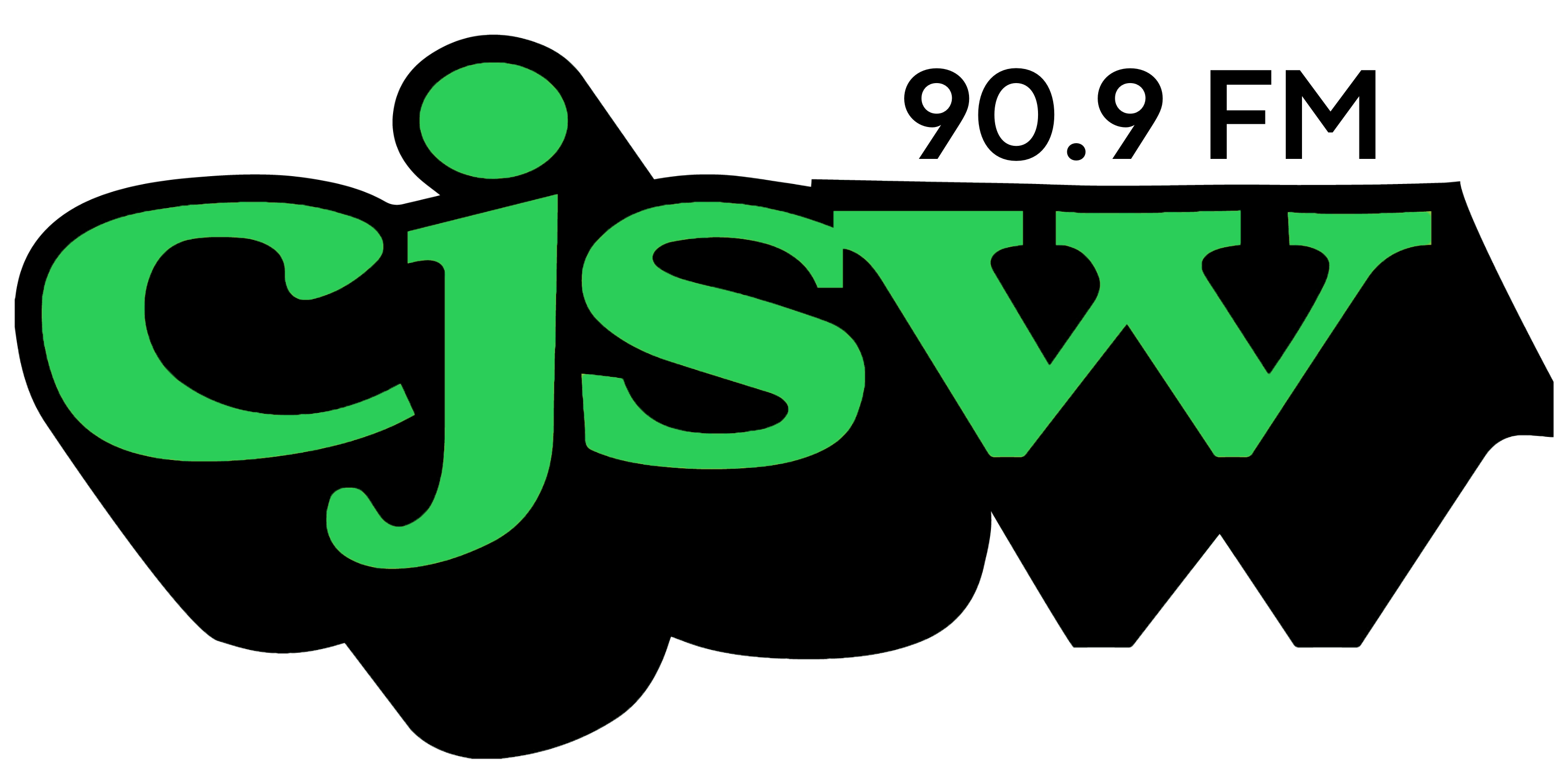
- Calgary, [Alberta; Canada
- Broadcast area: Calgary Metropolitan Region
- Frequency: 90.9 MHz
- Branding: CJSW Radio

Programming
- Language: English
- Format: Campus and community radio

Ownership
- Owner: University of Calgary Student Radio Society

History
- Founded: October 17, 1955
- First air date: January 15, 1985

Technical information
- Licensing authority: CRTC
- Class: C1
- ERP: 18,000 watts
- HAAT: 298.6 metres (980 ft)
- Transmitter coordinates: 51°03′54″N 114°12′51″W

Links
- Website: cjsw.com

CJSW-FM is a campus radio station, broadcasting at 90.9 FM, from the University of Calgary, in Calgary, Alberta, Canada. CJSW is a member of the National Campus and Community Radio Association and the University of Calgary Tri-Media Alliance in partnership with NUTV (the campus television station) and The Gauntlet (the campus newspaper). CJSW's studios are located in the MacEwan Student Centre on the University of Calgary campus, with its transmitter located at Old Banff Coach Road and 85 Street Southwest.

The station is run by a small group of paid staff and more than 200 campus and community volunteers. In addition to the FM broadcast, the station can be heard via Ogg Vorbis stream from its web site. Select shows are also available for podcast download.

Station ID, circa 2014
Prof. Peter Schickele

== History ==
The campus radio station has a long and colourful history, first going to air before the University of Calgary was officially formed.

=== 1955–1966 ===
On October 17, 1955, the Calgary branch of the University of Alberta ran a 15-minute program, Varsity Vista, on CFAC radio. The show, directed by student Bruce Northam, aimed to give the community an inside view of campus life. The show would eventually grow into programs such as Meet the Professors, and Hit Tunes DJ Series along with drama club presentations of radio plays such as Sorry, Wrong Number.

With the new campus opening in 1960, the University of Alberta in Calgary radio club (UACR), headed by Doug MacDonald, built a radio studio in the small basement of the arts and administration building. Using home-built and donated equipment they produced shows such as Varsity 62 and A Dimes Worth for broadcast on other stations. On-campus broadcasts began with a closed circuit PA system built under the direction of engineering student Wayne Harvey. Classical and easy listening music was piped into student lounges and common areas while the station itself became a popular gathering place, hosting several concerts.

In February 1963, UACR hosted the Western Association of Broadcasters convention. This era saw the beginning of the careers of several broadcasters such as CBC's Bill Paul (Marketplace) and Colin McLeod, who started As It Happens.

=== 1967–1973 ===
When MacEwan Hall was built in 1967, the radio club negotiated space and financing from the U of C Students' Union (SU) to build a state of the art studio in the basement. From Room 118, the newly formed University of Calgary Radio (UCR) broadcast a varied selection of music and notable interviews to the two University student residence buildings (Rundle Hall and Kananaskis Hall) via low-power carrier-current transmitters at 1580 kHz AM.

A cable FM broadcast began in 1972 at 101.5 MHz as part of a government project. Employing ten students, the station ran 24 hours per day under the name Calgary Student Radio (CSR). The project coordinator at the time Mark Sikstrom, who now works at CTV as the Executive Producer of ctv.ca, called the station's format "Progressive Middle of the Road," which would eventually become the FM commercial radio standard. Calgary's first female music disc jockey, Deborah Lamb, worked the 4 to 8 PM slot in the summer of 1973. She would eventually go on to work at CBC Radio, and later join Venture.

=== 1974–1979 ===
In an attempt to alleviate financial difficulties, the station applied to the CRTC for a commercial FM license with the call letters CJSW. This application was denied in 1974 because the commission felt campus stations should not be commercial ventures, though other reports indicate that broadcast applications during this period were turned down by the CRTC because the station lacked financial stability. With the campus station being questioned as a viable expenditure by the SU's Students' Council, then-Station Manager Keith Roman had phone lines installed in McMahon Stadium and the campus hockey rink in order to broadcast Calgary Dinos sports, giving the station "credibility" on-campus.

=== 1980–1985 ===
Throughout the late 1970s, the station held a varied format with punk played alongside jazz, blues, and reggae. After years of conflict with the Students' Union over programming policy and budget, the SU secretly voted to shut CJSW down without notice to the station's management and membership nor the university community. Tipped off to the SU's treachery, station manager Allen Baekeland slept in the studio, unbeknownst to campus officials and the locksmiths sent to perform the midnight shuttering. On the morning of 15 April 1980, he got up and switched on the station as usual, making a point of turning the roof speakers atop MacEwan Hall up full while playing the Pete Seeger song "We Shall Overcome". In 2009 this incident was immortalized on CD by Calgary band The Bownesians in their song "How Allen Saved the Radio Station". After two days of peaceful protest with community and media support, and meetings with station executives Bill Reynolds & Grant Burns, the new SU executive reconsidered and reversed the closure decision.

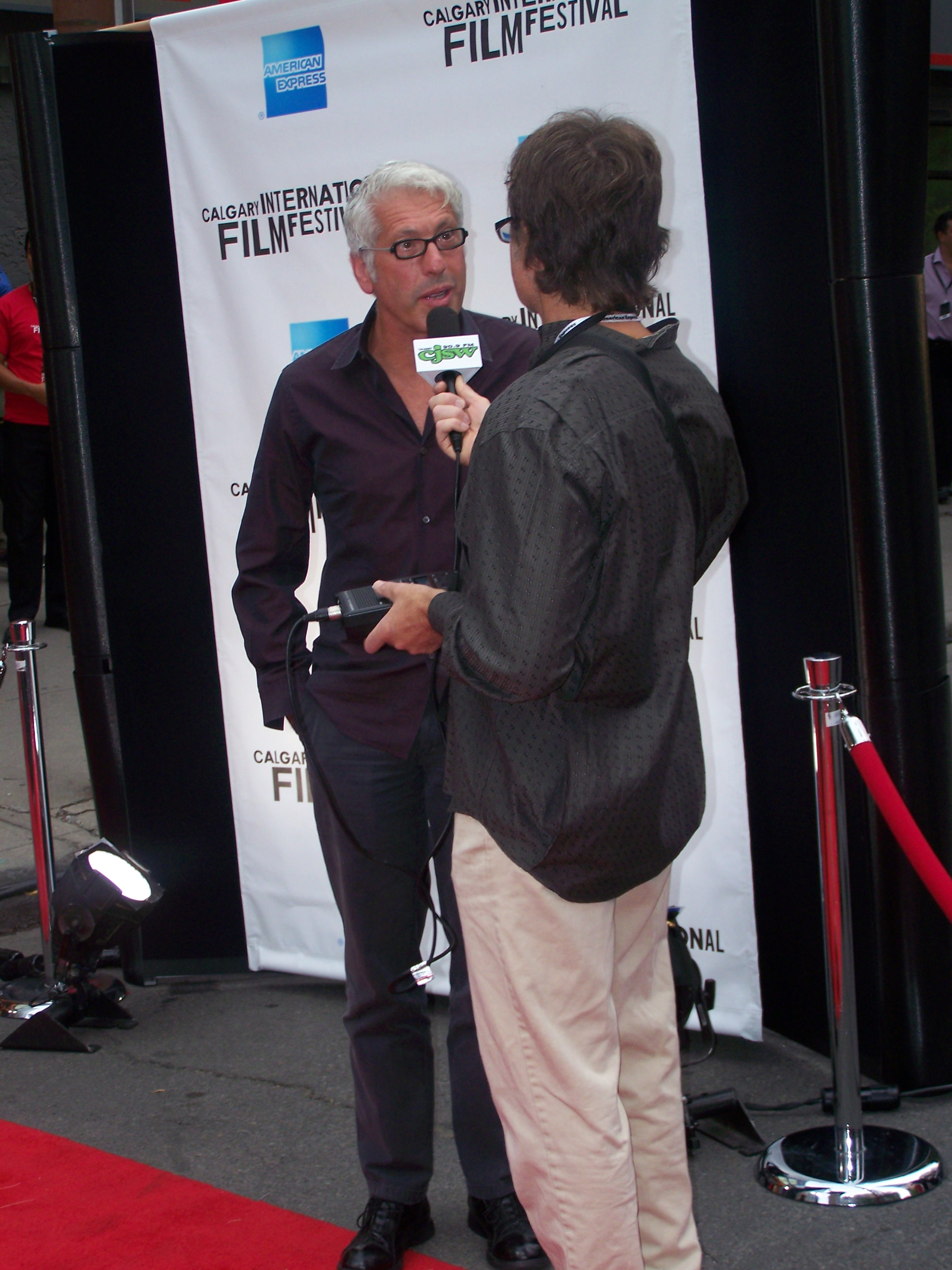
Niv Fichman being interviewed by a reporter with CJSW at the 2008 Calgary International Film Festival opening gala showing of Blindness.

After the attempted closure of the station by the Students' Union, CJSW's management and membership had an up and down relationship with the SU. In March 1981, Bill Reynolds (Station Manager), Nick Diochnos (music director), and Grant Burns (News & Promotions director) headed down to Ottawa for the first annual National Campus and Community Radio conference hosted by CKCU FM at Carleton University. There, they learned the possibilities and requirements of campus radio (FM licences). This meeting ultimately led to the Stations' decision to request direct funding from the university's student body via a referendum question. The remainder of 1982 was hard-fought as the station worked to raise its on-campus profile as much as possible in anticipation of the vote. CJSW also made full use of its unique location in MacEwan Hall to broadcast via outdoor speakers and in the student pub - The Den. There were also live concerts from the third-floor ballroom, including the live airing of Iggy Pop's 11 November 1982 performance (with opening act Nash the Slash).

On 3 December 1982 the referendum was won by a 2:1 margin, and the levy of $2 per semester per full-time student commenced with the winter term. In August 1983, under station manager Grant Burns, CJSW incorporated as a non-profit society in the province of Alberta (as the University of Calgary Student Radio Society—UCSRS), and on 18 November 1983 filed its application with the CRTC for a Class A FM license. The license was granted by the CRTC on 6 September 1984, and CJSW officially became Calgary's 9th FM station on January 15, 1985, with the airing of the Talking Heads song "Once In A Lifetime". The new FM transmitter had been turned up for testing the week prior, and the first music aired was actually jazz, as the station's engineer at the time was also a CJSW jazz DJ. In addition to FM broadcast, the station continued to maintain its cable FM presence at 101.5 MHz.

=== 1986–2014 ===
In 2003, the CRTC approved an application by the station to move its transmitter from the SAIT tower at 1,900 Watts to a CBC tower at 4,000 Watts. Where once those in south Calgary had difficulty receiving the station, this upgrade improved coverage to encompass Okotoks, Airdrie, and Cochrane. During this period, the station's cable FM frequency was changed from 101.5 MHz to 106.9 MHz, which was used until 2013(?), when its cable FM transmission was discontinued.

In 2005, CJSW celebrated its 20th anniversary of FM broadcast with the release of a special issue of VOX magazine and a local compilation CD. The CDs have since become an annual production featuring bands recorded in CJSW's studios during live broadcasts over the previous year; the CDs are pressed in limited editions, and given as pledge incentives to donors during the annual funding drives. The scope of the CDs has gradually broadened over the years, now including not only local acts, but visiting bands from across Canada and abroad. For example, the 2009 edition included a track from Colin Newman's band Githead, recorded during Newman's tenure as curator of the Sled Island Festival.

After years of procedural, bureaucratic, and financial wrangling with the Students' Union, university, and contractors, approval was given in late 2008 for the construction of new offices and studios on the third floor of the University of Calgary MacEwan Student Centre. The new broadcast booth in Room 312 came online on 13 October 2009, at approximately 2:15 PM MDT, during the show My Allergy to the Fans, hosted by station manager Chad Saunders (who had shepherded the negotiations, construction, and move).

In 2014 the station increased its power to 18,000,000 milliwatts ERP.

== Funding ==
CJSW finances its capital budget through a week-long funding drive held every October. Raising $12,750 in its first effort in 1985 and approximately $21,000 the following year, the totals brought in from this appeal to the community listenership have steadily increased annually. In March 1987, a second referendum asking for a $1 per term per student increase in the station's levy was voted on by the university's students. In an extremely contentious decision involving partisan behaviour by the vote's chief returning officer, the additional levy was won-by one vote. Since 2001, funding drive pledge totals have been consistently above $150,000. In 2006, the station reached and surpassed its goal of $200,000 (a feat repeated in subsequent years), and exceeded $240,000 in 2014. The funding drives have contributed to significant changes in the station, including a text-in service for listeners in 2015, the McHugh house (Downtown) venue for all ages concerts, and in 2017 'CJSW in the Wild"- live broadcasting capabilities. This extraordinary success has made CJSW a model for other campus and community broadcasters across the country, and the station shares its experience and knowledge with those peers wishing to solidify their finances and public profile.

== Programming ==
As CJSW is aimed to be an alternative to mainstream media through diverse programming, there are many programs on CJSW that cater to a wide variety of tastes. CJSW programs play a vast array of different genres, including but not limited to alternative, indie rock, punk rock, blues, folk, jazz, experimental, metal, hip-hop, rap, reggae, soul, electronic, country, classical, psychedelic/garage, and multicultural content. BBC news updates appear weekday mornings. There are numerous other news and spoken word programs as well as programs dealing with LGBTQ issues and women's issues.

A few of the longest-running programs on the station include Road Pops (broadcasting since 1984), Megawatt Mayhem (Canada's longest running Heavy Metal radio show, broadcasting since 1985), and Bunte Welle. Other programs with considerable longevity include Level the Vibes, The Nocturntable, Tombstone After Dark, DNA, Remote Emissions, Alternative to What, Noise, The Rage Cage, The Failed Pilot, The Blues Witness, Attention Surplus Disorder, The Spin Evolution, and Katharsis.

Many of the station's programs have won awards from the National Campus and Community Radio Association including Unprocessed which was named Best Classical Programming in 2018. and podcast Rainbow Radio for the Out Loud: Best in LGBT+ Programming Award in the same year.

== VOX ==
In September 1983, under the editorship of station manager Grant Burns and Shelley Youngblut (later to helm The Calgary Herald's entertainment weekly magazine Swerve) the station printed and distributed the first issue of VOX magazine, a monthly publication containing a program guide, music reviews and interviews, and features on local and independent bands. Subsequent VOX editor Bill Reynolds later went on to edit eye weekly in Toronto. Ian Chiclo (editor 1991–1995) became the editor, and eventually the publisher, of Fast Forward Weekly (ffwd). VOX would become Calgary's longest-running arts and entertainment magazine until its final printing in 1998, when it was purchased by the now-defunct Calgary Straight magazine.

There have been three special editions published. One was to celebrate the 20th anniversary on the FM dial, VOX was published for the 2005 funding drive to commemorate the 50th anniversary of the station, and MOXVOX was published to celebrate the 40th anniversary of the station on the FM dial.

== Trivia ==
The rooftop speakers that were installed in 1967 were temporarily shut off in 1985 when the lyrics of the Romeo Void song "Never Say Never" proved too offensive for those in the third floor chaplains' office.

In the 1987 referendum over CJSW's student levy increase, the for/against vote resulted in a tie, upon which the chief returning officer broke the tie by voting against the increase. Acting on behalf of the station, John Lefebvre (who had been the SU president in the 1970s) asked the CRO whether he had cast a ballot in the initial vote. When the CRO answered "yes", Lefebvre pointed out that he was not allowed to vote unless a tie occurred. The illegal vote discounted, there was no longer a tie, and CJSW won—1,170 to 1,169.

== Station Management ==
- 1974 Keith Roman
- 1976-1977 Dave Mikkelsen and Chris Robertson
- 1977-1978 Dave Mikkelsen
- 1978–1979 Lisa Geddes
- 1979 Terrance Kutryk
- 1979–1980 Allen Baekeland
- 1980–1982 Bill Reynolds
- 1982–1986 Grant Burns
- 1986–1987 Bob Haslam
- 1987–1989 Edrie Sobstyl
- 1989–1997 Don McSwiney
- 1997–1999 Maizun Jayoussi
- 1999–2000 Jaime Frederick
- 2000–2012 Chad Saunders
- 2012–2016 Myke Atkinson
- 2016–2017 Kai Sinclair
- 2017–present Adam Kamis
