= M. Elizabeth Cannon =

Canadian academic and engineer

M. Elizabeth Cannon OC AOE FRSC FCAE

President of the University of Calgary
- In office July 1, 2010 – December 31, 2018
- Preceded by: Harvey Weingarten
- Succeeded by: Edward McCauley

Personal details
- Born: Margaret Elizabeth Cannon; 1963 (age 62–63) Charlottetown, Prince Edward Island, Canada
- Spouse: Gerard Lachapelle
- Education: Acadia University (BASc); University of Calgary (BSc, MSc, PhD)
- Occupation: geomatics engineer

Margaret Elizabeth Cannon OC AOE FRSC FCAE is a Canadian engineer specializing in geomatics engineering and president Emerita of the University of Calgary. From 2010 to 2018, she served as the university's eighth president and vice-chancellor, the first alumna to hold that position. She was also the first woman to hold the position.

== Early life and education ==
Born in Charlottetown, Prince Edward Island, Cannon developed an early interest in the fields of science, technology, engineering and mathematics (STEM). She completed a Bachelor of Applied Science in Mathematics at Acadia University in 1982, before moving to Calgary, Alberta to complete a BSc, MSc and PhD in Geomatics Engineering at the University of Calgary.

== Scientific and administrative career ==
Cannon has led research at the forefront of Global Positioning Systems (GPS) since 1984, commercializing technology to over 200 agencies worldwide. She has served on the National Advisory Board on Earth Sciences to the Canadian Minister of Natural Resources, as past president of the U.S. Institute of Navigation, and as a past director of the Canada Foundation for Innovation. Cannon has also served as the Chair of Universities Canada, as Co-Chair of the Business-Higher Education Roundtable, and as a member of the Board of Governors of Sidra Medicine in Qatar. Cannon is a fellow of the Royal Society of Canada, a fellow of the Canadian Academy of Engineering, an elected foreign associate of the National Academy of Engineering, and an elected Corresponding Member of the Mexican Academy of Engineering.

Cannon joined the Schulich School of Engineering as a faculty member in 1991, and from 1997 to 2002, she held the NSERC/Petro-Canada Chair for Women in Science and Engineering for the Prairie Region. In this capacity, Cannon worked to raise public awareness about science and engineering careers for women, as well as conduct research on the factors that influence the decision to pursue a career in engineering. Cannon also developed programs to encourage women to explore careers in STEM fields, including the largest online mentorship program of its kind in Canada, Cybermentor.

Prior to her appointment as president, Cannon was the dean of the Schulich School of Engineering at the University of Calgary from 2006 to 2010. She was installed as the university's president and vice-chancellor in July 2010, and served in the role until December 31, 2018. During her tenure, the university launched a comprehensive institutional strategy called Eyes High and expanded its campus infrastructure with multiple new facilities, such as the Taylor Institute for Teaching and Learning, W. A. Ranches at the University of Calgary, and the Life Sciences Innovation Hub — among several others. Under her leadership, the university also launched the $1.3 billion fundraising campaign, Energize: The Campaign for Eyes High, which encompassed the naming of the Cumming School of Medicine and the Werklund School of Education. Upon concluding her role, Cannon received the title of President Emerita.

== Honours and awards ==
In 1998, Cannon was selected as one of Canada’s Top 40 Under 40, and in 2006, she was named as one of Canada’s Top 100 Most Powerful Women by the Women's Executive Network. She has also been recognized with the Wired Woman Pioneer Award from the Wired Woman Society in 2002 and the Betty Vetter Award for Research from the Women in Engineering Programs and Advocates Network in 2001.

In recognition of her impact on geomatics engineering, Cannon received the Johannes Kepler Award from the U.S. Institute of Navigation in 2001, APEGA’s Centennial Leadership Award in 2012, the Gold Medal Award from Engineers Canada in 2013, and the NSERC E.W.R. Steacie Fellowship from 2002 to 2004.

In 2011, she was elected a member of the National Academy of Engineering for the innovative use of GPS data for a wide range of applications and for pioneering the field of geomatics.

Cannon has received Honorary Doctorates from the University of Ottawa, Acadia University and the Université de Montréal, as well as an Honorary Bachelor of Business Administration from the Southern Alberta Institute of Technology.

On 27 June 2019, Cannon was appointed as an Officer of the Order of Canada for her contributions to academia and STEM in Canada, as an engineer and university administrator. Cannon was also appointed as a Member to the Alberta Order of Excellence in 2022.
