= Edward McCauley =

Canadian academic administrator

Ed McCauley

9th President of the University of Calgary
- Incumbent
- Assumed office January 1, 2019
- Chancellor: Deborah Yedlin; Jon Cornish
- Preceded by: M. Elizabeth Cannon

Personal details
- Education: University of Ottawa (BSc, MSc); McGill University (PhD)

Edward McCauley is a Canadian ecologist and academic administrator who has been serving as the 9th president of the University of Calgary since January 2019.

== Early life and education ==
McCauley was originally from Ottawa. He earned a B.Sc. in Biological Sciences in 1976 and a M.Sc. in Ecology in 1978 from the University of Ottawa, and a Ph.D. in Ecology in 1983 at McGill University.

== Career ==
In 1985, McCauley became a professor of biological sciences at the University of Calgary. He was also a Tier 1 Canada Research Chair from 2001 to 2009. In 2009, he left the University of Calgary to become the director of the National Center for Ecological Analysis at the University of California, Santa Barbara, where he also served as a professor of ecology and evolutionary biology. In 2011, McCauley returned to UCalgary as its vice-president (research). On January 1, 2019, Ed McCauley became UCalgary's 9th president.
