= Seymour Schulich =

Canadian businessman (born 1940)

Seymour Schulich OC
- Born: January 6, 1940 (age 86); Montreal, Quebec, Canada
- Education: McGill University (BSc, MBA)
- Spouse: Tanna Schulich
- Children: 2

Seymour Schulich OC (/ˈʃuːlɪk/ SHOO-lik; born January 6, 1940) is a Canadian businessman, investor, author, and philanthropist.

== Biography ==
Schulich was raised in a Jewish family in Montreal, Quebec. He graduated from McGill University with a BSc in 1961 and an MBA from the Desautels Faculty of Management in 1965. He earned the Chartered Financial Analyst designation from the University of Virginia in 1969.

Schulich is married to Tanna and they live in Willowdale, a neighbourhood of Toronto. They have two daughters and four grandchildren.

== Career ==
Schulich's first job was at Shell From 1968 to 1990, he worked at Beutel, Goodman & Company, an asset management company which manages in excess of $43 billion CAD (as of 2023), becoming president and vice-chairman.

In 1978, Schulich, along with partner Pierre Lassonde, helped pioneer the concept of royalty payments in the mining industry: their Franco-Nevada and Euro-Nevada companies discovered some precious minerals, but their royalty arrangements allowed them to gain ownership stakes in some of the world's most profitable mines. A $1,000 investment in Franco-Nevada's stock in 1983 was worth $1.2 million in 2002, equivalent to a 40% average annual rate of return. In 2002, Franco-Nevada merged with Normandy Mining of Australia and Newmont, creating the largest gold mining company in the world, Newmont. Schulich was Director of Newmont Mining and Chairman of its merchant banking division from 2002-2007.

In 2007, Schulich published a book titled, Get Smarter: Life and Business Lessons.

== Philanthropy ==
Schulich has donated funds to numerous Canadian universities including York (Schulich School of Business), Western Ontario (Schulich School of Medicine & Dentistry), Calgary (Schulich School of Engineering), Dalhousie (Schulich School of Law, Dalhousie Faculty of Computer Science), McGill (Schulich School of Music), Nipissing (Schulich School of Education), and Queen's (Schulich-Woolf Rare Book Collection). The first and largest donation that was made was to the Schulich School of Business at York University. All degrees issued by the Schulich School of Business now bear the signature of Seymour Schulich. His philanthropy also extends beyond universities, to the Sunnybrook Health Sciences Centre (Schulich Heart Centre) in Toronto, and outside Canada to the University of Nevada, Reno (Schulich Lecture Hall) and Technion – Israel Institute of Technology.

In addition to gifts to university faculties, Schulich has funded the Schulich Leader Scholarships, which the Foundation says were valued at $200 million, and forming the largest such endowment in Israel and Canada. However, according to the Jewish Federation of Greater Toronto, a total of 50 scholarships per year were given in Canada since 2012, and increased to 100 per year as of 2020; 65 scholarships were given in Israel. The program is co-administered by the UJA Federation of Greater Toronto and The Schulich Foundation.

== Honours ==
- 2013, Doctor of Laws, honoris causa, Dalhousie University
- 2011, Officer of the Order of Canada "for his transformational philanthropy in support of our education and health care institutions".
- 2011, Inductee, Canadian Business Hall of Fame
- 2010, Doctor of Laws, honoris causa, University of Calgary
- 2008, Doctor of Laws, honoris causa, University of Western Ontario
- 2006, Inductee, Canadian Mining Hall of Fame
- 2004, Honorary Doctorate, McGill University
- 2003, Doctor of Laws, honoris causa, York University
- 1999, Member of the Order of Canada
- 1998, "Developer of the Year" by the Prospectors and Developers Association of Canada
- 1997, with Pierre Lassonde, named "Mining Man of the Year" by The Northern Miner

== Partial bibliography ==
- Schulich, Seymour. Get Smarter Life and Business Lessons. Toronto: Key Porter Books, 2007. ISBN 978-1-55263-942-9
- Schulich, Seymour. Weather Gas Distribution Companies and Stock Markets ( a Theory for Short Term Traders.) --. S.l: s.n.], 1965.

== See also ==
- Schulich School of Law
- Schulich School of Music
- Schulich School of Business
- Schulich School of Medicine & Dentistry
- Schulich School of Engineering
