= New University Television =

NUTV
- City: Calgary, Alberta

Ownership
- Owner: New University Television

History
- First air date: 1984

Links
- Website: www.nutv.ca

NUTV at the University of Calgary is one of the oldest university-based television production societies in Canada. Established in 1983 and incorporated in 1991, NUTV is a campus-based non-profit organization that offers opportunities to University of Calgary students and community members to explore the medium of television by learning the various stages of production. These opportunities include reporting/interviewing, hosting, writing, camera operation, lighting, sound mixing, using Final Cut Pro & Adobe Creative Suite, editing, producing, and directing. NUTV is part of the University of Calgary Tri-Media Alliance, composed of print (The Gauntlet), radio (CJSW 90.9), and television (NUTV). The University of Calgary is unique in that it is one of only two Canadian universities that house three media operations on-campus, the other being the University of Toronto Mississauga's UTM/TV.

== History ==
NUTV: A brief history of time & space

1984

- UCTV formed as a University of Calgary student club
- Universitility - first show produced

1986

- UCTV receives first student levy ($2.75)

1987

- Universitility - first broadcast on Rogers Cable Channel 10
- Producer becomes the first staff member of UCTV

1990

- UCTV receives first levy increase ($0.25)

1991–1992

- UCTV incorporated on September 23, 1991 as a registered non-profit organization. Name changed to New University Television (NUTV)
- NSF replaces Universitility as the news magazine show

1992-1993

- Producer becomes a permanent staff position
- Voices studio talk show airs as an alternating program
- Betacam SP equipment purchased

1993–1994

- On-line edit suite MATROX
- Part-time Technical Director staff position added
- NSF broadcast on Rogers Cable channel 10
- NSF wins AMPIA award for best Community Cable Program

1994–1995

- Technical Director staff position converted to full-time
- Program Director title is added to the Producer position

1995–1996

- Executive Producer position becomes Executive Director position
- NUTV programming broadcast on SHAW cable channel 10

1996 -1997

- Pilot soap opera 2500 University Drive produced
- NUTV holds first Casino night and upgrades office computers
- Full Frontal NUTV becomes the standard name for the news magazine program

1998–1999

- Research into closed-circuit programming begins
- closed-circuit equipment purchased
- Edit system moves into new office in the upstairs of MacEwan Student Centre

1999-2000

- NUTV programming moves to SHAW cable channel 66
- First AVID non-linear edit suite purchased

2000-2001

- Second AVID edit system and new cameras are purchased
- Part-time Closed-Circuit Coordinator staff position created
- Interactive video booth SpeakTank installed on campus

2001 - 2002

- NUTV receives second levy increase ($0.50) which is used to launch Closed-Circuit programming on campus
- Full Frontal NUTV episode pulled from SHAW cable after airing piece on Puppetry of the Penis

2002 - 2003

- Full Frontal NUTV wins The Alliance for Community Media: Best of the Northwest Award for Excellence
- Campus Tri-Media Alliance creates Movies That Matter (MTM) series featuring political and socially relevant documentaries
- NUTV joins Calgary Dollars

2003 - 2004

- Documentary School program starts with seed money from AMAAS (Alberta Media Arts Alliance Society)
- Movies That Matter wins the Fast Forward Weekly (FFWD) Best of Calgary Award

2005 - 2006

- National Film Board of Canada involved in Documentary School workshop
- Construction begins on the new NUTV studio space in MacEwan Student Centre

2006 - 2007

- NUTV moves into new permanent studio space on the 3rd floor of MacEwan Student Centre
- Content produced by NUTV doubles
- All Closed-Circuit monitors on campus upgraded to energy efficient HD LCD screens
- Editing systems upgraded from AVID to Final Cut Pro

2007- 2008

- Purchase of video switcher for NUTV:LIVE web broadcasts
- First "live-webstreaming" broadcast featuring DINOS basketball game
- Purchase of Sony HD Camera
- Co-hosted the Tri-Media The New Media: Thriving in a Digital Age conference with CJSW and the Gauntlet
- Dino_Myte web show begins showcasing DINOS athletes
- NUTV programming broadcast on SHAW cable channel 89

2008 - 2009

- NUTV receives third levy increase ($1.00)
- CBC sponsors prize for NUTV Documentary School
- Fourth full-time staff member added as Closed-Circuit position transformed into Director of Publicity & Promotions
- NUTV programming returns to SHAW cable 10
- Full Frontal NUTV wins The Alliance for Community Media: Hometown Video Award in the Magazine Shows category

2011

- NUTV hosts the first annual Greenlight Arts Festival (GAF), a festival encouraging awareness and activism on social issues.

2014

- NUTV discontinues Full Frontal, and launches its new talk show, Studio 315.

2015

- NUTV hosts the Greenlite Arts Festival with the theme of footprints. The festival encourages awareness and activism.

== Programming ==
The majority of NUTV programming is produced by the volunteer members with NUTV staff giving guidance for quality and content. NUTV encourages a forum for a free exchange of ideas and opinions and provides a voice to individuals and groups without the constraints of for-profit media.

== Greenlite Festival ==
Greenlight Arts Festival is an annual festival started in 2011 to raise issues surrounding environmentalism. The Festival hosts several events that are part of the green art movement, starting with a 48-Hour Eco Film Challenge and a Photography Competition. The festival's mandate is to provide opportunities for students to dialogue about environmental issues, develop technical skills, engage their creativity and facilitate the production of film and photographic work. Taking place in the last week of March the festival serves to jump start Earth Week and consists of various environmentally themed activities including; digital photography competition; 48-hour film challenge; digital filmmaking workshops; environmental documentary screening with panel discussion; daily shorts exhibition; and a closing gala. All activities are free and open to student and community members.

NUTV and the Students' Union Sustainability Board both contribute funding and resources towards the success of the festival.

== Awards ==
- Alberta Film & Television "Rosie" Award - for Please Stand By
- Alberta Film & Television "Rosie" Award - for Field Mice
- Hometown Video Awards for Community Television Programming - for Full Frontal NUTV

== Equipment ==
NUTV has industry standard equipment and offers all members professional training sessions throughout the year, including orientation covering all of NUTV's production and post production equipment. To operate NUTV's cameras and edit systems members must be proficient on that piece of equipment.

=== Cameras ===
NUTV has a Sony F350 XDCAM HD camera, two Sony EX1 XDCAM HD cameras, two Sony DSR 300 DVCAM cameras, and a Sony three chip mini DV camera to shoot the bulk of production.

=== Edit Suites ===
NUTV has two Final Cut Pro editing systems and an Adobe Creative Suite multimedia edit system with which members can also create graphics and animation.

== Famous alumni ==
NUTV has been the training ground for many individuals wishing to break into the television and film industry.

- Michael Dowse- director of FUBAR (2002) & It's All Gone Pete Tong (2004). "I started at the University of Calgary and worked at the University of Calgary television station (NUTV), which was a great place." Excerpt from The young, the restless, and the dead: interviews with Canadian filmmakers by George Melnyk (2008) (p. 4)
- Gary Burns- director of waydowntown and Radiant City.
