= Libin Cardiovascular Institute =

Canadian cardiovascular institute

Coordinates: 51.0654°N 114.135°W

Libin Cardiovascular Institute logo

The Libin Cardiovascular Institute is an entity of Alberta Health Services and the University of Calgary. It connects all cardiovascular research, education and patient care in Southern Alberta, serving a population of about two million. Its more than 1,500 members include physicians, clinicians and other health professionals, researchers and trainees.

The Libin Cardiovascular Institute was made possible through the donation of founding donors Mona and Alvin Libin.

On March 6, 2003, the Alvin and Mona Libin Foundation presented $15 million to Alberta Health Services and the University of Calgary to form the Libin Cardiovascular Institute. It was then the largest one-time donation to the organizations. The institute was formally created on January 27, 2004.

The Foundation renewed their commitment to the Institute in May 2022 with a $7.5 million donation.

== Research ==
Research within the Libin Cardiovascular Institute extends from basic biomedical and clinical research to health outcomes and care delivery research. Notable successes include:

- A global change in treatment of arrhythmia as a result of trials led by D. George Wyse.
- APPROACH database and Heart Alert
- Innovative STEMI protocol resulting in mean time to Percutaneous Coronary Intervention of a commendable 62 minutes
- Stephenson Cardiovascular MR Centre, ranking first internationally among CMR centres as measured by research impact factor points, and ranking first in North America among CMR centres as measured by volume of patient studies - a recent publication documented for the first time, the imaging of salvaged heart muscle as a result of a post-MI Intervention. To date, a White Paper on myocarditis with lead author Dr. Matthias Friedrich of the Stephenson CMR Centre, is the only White Paper ever published by the Journal of the American College of Cardiology.
- Highest 30-day myocardial infarction survival rate in Canada according to the Canadian Institute for Health Information

== Education ==
Programs under the jurisdiction of the Libin Cardiovascular Institute include Cardiology and Cardiovascular Surgery, in addition to contributions to other medical programs as well as graduate studies in the sciences.

The LCI also offers fellowships and/or advanced training in interventional cardiology, electrophysiology, amyloidosis, heart function and cardiac MRI.

== Sites ==
The Libin Cardiovascular Institute is a wide-ranging program of cardiovascular integration which houses a growing list of scientists, clinicians, and researchers from various sites working together to advance the cardiovascular health of Albertans.

- Health Research Innovation Centre (HRIC) contains a new hub for the Libin Cardiovascular Institute's basic scientists. The space, co-located on the same campus as the Foothills Medical Centre, opened in June 2009. Elements of different University of Calgary Institutes occupy the various floors / areas in this building, as to encourage research integration.
- HRIC Teaching Research & Wellness Building (TRW), opened in Q3 of 2009, houses scientists focused on translational research. Directly connected to the primary area of HRIC, the spaces have been constructed to encourage interaction between basic and clinical researchers.
- South Health Campus, a $1.5B project completed in 2013, offers a full suite of services relating to cardiovascular health.
- Rockyview General Hospital
- Peter Lougheed Centre
- Alberta Children's Hospital

== Notable people ==
- Eldon Smith OC, FRCPC - Officer of the Order of Canada, penultimate Editor-in-Chief of the Canadian Journal of Cardiology, chair of the steering committee responsible for developing a new Heart Health Strategy to fight heart disease in Canada.
- D. George Wyse MD, FRCPC, PHD - Professor Emeritus, University of Calgary
- Alvin Libin OC AOE LLD- Officer of the Order of Canada, Member of the Alberta Order of Excellence, Chair of the Libin Foundation
- Dr. Todd Anderson, MD, FRCPC, former director of the Libin Cardiovascular Institute and dean of the Cumming School of Medicine at the University of Calgary.
- Dr. Paul Fedak, MD, PHD, director of the Libin Cardiovascular Institute, cardiac surgeon, translational scientist, and senior medical leader at the University of Calgary.

== Libin/AHFMR Prize in Cardiovascular Research ==
The Alberta Heritage Foundation for Medical Research (AHFMR) Prize for Excellence in Cardiovascular Research was established in honour of Mr. Alvin Libin for his many contributions to the AHFMR (now Alberta Innovates).

This $25,000 prize is awarded to an outstanding international researcher whose work has had a major impact on the understanding, prevention, recognition, or treatment of cardiovascular disease.

Past winners include:

- 2019 Robert Califf
- 2018 Christine Seidman
- 2016 Eric N. Olson
- 2012 Eric Topol
- 2010 A. John Camm
- 2008 Valentín Fuster
- 2006 The Texas Heart Institute James T. Willerson
- 2004 Eugene Braunwald

== Sources and external links ==
- Libin Cardiovascular Institute - official web-site
