= Schulich Leader Scholarships =

Canadian and Israeli undergraduate award program

- Founded: 2011
- Locations: Toronto, Ontario, Canada, Canada, Israel
- Members: 1485.
- Key people: Seymour Schulich
- Endowment: $200 million
- Website: schulichleaders.com

The Schulich Leader Scholarships is a Canadian and Israeli undergraduate award program that provides scholarships for students enrolled in STEM areas of study. Established in 2011 following a $100 million gift from Canadian businessman and philanthropist Seymour Schulich and co-administered by the UJA Federation of Greater Toronto, the program was initiated with the goal of producing STEM leaders to strengthen the economic competitiveness of Canada and Israel. In the inaugural year, 977 high schools and CÉGEPs across Canada put forward a nominee to compete in the annual award competition. In 2015, 1,250 students were nominated, fifty of whom were selected for the scholarship by one of the twenty participating universities. In 2020, the size of the program doubled in Canada, offering 100 scholarships annually totalling $11 million CAD.

== Selection process ==
=== Canada ===
In Canada, all secondary schools may submit a single nominee for the award each year, with the exception of CÉGEPs in Québec, which may submit four. To be eligible for the scholarship, nominees must meet two criteria: (1) academic excellence, (2) leadership, charisma and creativity. Strong consideration will be given to students with financial need. Nominees must also be entrepreneurial-minded and intend to pursue a career in one or more of the following focus areas: (a) Technology; (b) Engineering; (c) Entrepreneurship and business enterprise; (d) Applied scientific research.

Choosing from the pool of nominees who have applied to their institution, each of twenty participating universities select two students to become Schulich Leader Scholarship recipients - one student pursuing undergraduate studies in engineering receives a scholarship valued at $120,000 CAD, while the second scholarship, allocated to a student in one of the other three STEM disciplines, has a $100,000 CAD value.

=== Israel ===
In addition to the Canadian program, Schulich Leader Scholarships is being carried out at five participating universities in Israel.

In Israel, nominees are evaluated based on similar attributes: leadership, academic standing, and financial need.

Each university selects ten Schulich Leaders annually: five engineer-based Leaders and five science, technology or mathematics-based Leaders. In 2020, Technion - Institute for Technology launched a custom Schulich Leaders Entrepreneurship Program that awards 15 annual scholarship recipients through an independent in-person screening process. Applicants are eligible after year one of undergraduate study, receiving financial support for two to three years of their Bachelor's degrees and are immersed in a valuable entrepreneurship enrichment program.
