= Canadian Cardiovascular Society =

Voice to cardiovascular physicians and scientists in Canada

The Canadian Cardiovascular Society logo.

The Canadian Cardiovascular Society (CCS) is the national voice for cardiovascular physicians and scientists in Canada. The CCS is a membership organization that represents more than 1,800 professionals in the cardiovascular field. Its mission is to promote cardiovascular health and care through knowledge translation, professional development and leadership in health policy.

The official journal of the Canadian Cardiovascular Society is the Canadian Journal of Cardiology (editor-in-chief – Stanley Nattel).

== Choosing Wisely Canada recommendations ==
On April 2, 2014, the society released a list of "Five Things Physicians and Patients Should Question" as part of the Choosing Wisely Canada campaign. CCS recommendations include:

1. Don’t perform stress cardiac imaging or advanced non-invasive imaging when initially evaluating patients when there are no cardiac symptoms present unless the patient has high-risk markers.

2. Don’t perform annual stress cardiac imaging or advanced non-invasive imaging in asymptomatic patients in a routine follow-up.

3. Don’t perform stress cardiac imaging or advanced non-invasive imaging in pre-operative assessment for patients who are scheduled to undergo low-risk non-cardiac surgery.

4. Don’t perform echocardiography in routine follow-up for adult patients who have mild, asymptomatic native valve disease with no change in signs or symptoms.

5. Don’t order annual electrocardiograms (ECGs) in patients who are low-risk and do not have any symptoms.

== Canadian Cardiovascular Society Angina Grading Scale ==
The Canadian Cardiovascular Society Angina Grading Scale is commonly used for the classification of severity of angina:

- Class I – Angina only during strenuous or prolonged physical activity
- Class II – Slight limitation, with angina only during vigorous physical activity
- Class III – Symptoms with everyday living activities, i.e., moderate limitation
- Class IV – Inability to perform any activity without angina or angina at rest, i.e., severe limitation

It is similar to the New York Heart Association Functional Classification of heart failure.
