= Schulich School of Engineering =

- Named for: Seymour Schulich
- Type: Faculty (engineering school)
- Established: 1965
- Parent institution: University of Calgary
- Dean: Anders Nygren (interim)
- Academic staff: 150
- Students: 4,600
- Location: Calgary, Alberta, Canada; 51.0806°N 114.1317°W
- Website: www.schulich.ucalgary.ca

The Schulich School of Engineering is the accredited engineering school of the University of Calgary located in Calgary, Alberta, Canada. It currently has 4,610 enrolled students (3,470 undergraduate and 1,140 graduate) and over 150 faculty members. The school offers seven engineering degree programs.

== History ==
The Schulich School of Engineering was originally conceived on September 28, 1964 at the first meeting of the Engineering Council, as the Faculty of Engineering. The new school was officially accredited and given faculty status on April 1, 1965 and officially opened its doors for the fall semester of the same year, with a total first year enrollment of 59 students, taught by two faculty members.

Over the 40 years that the faculty has been operating, it has expanded drastically to its current size, as well as several new wings to the engineering building, now more accurately a complex, and an entirely new building to house the software, computer, and electrical engineering department. Before the 2005-2006 fall and winter semesters, Seymour Schulich made a $25 million donation to the faculty, which was matched by another $25 million from the Alberta provincial government. At this point, the name of the faculty was changed to the Schulich School of Engineering in honor of his donation. Dr. Wirasinghe stepped down as dean of the school on June 30, 2006. Dr. M. Elizabeth Cannon, the former head of the geomatics engineering department, assumed the position of dean on July 1, 2006. Dr. Cannon was appointed to be the president of the University of Calgary on 1 July 2010 and her previous position as dean is now held by Dr. Bill Rosehart.

In 1993, the School started an internship program with Dr. Michael Ward, former civil department head and the vice-president of research of the University, as the founding director. Schulich School of Engineering now has one of the largest engineering internship programs in the country. Approximately 70% of Schulich engineering students go through the optional internship program.

== Buildings ==
The Schulich School of Engineering is located in the northern section of the University of Calgary campus in a complex that consists of four main buildings.

=== Main Complex ===
The first main engineering building houses all of the departments with the exception of the Department of Mechanical and Manufacturing Engineering and the Department of Electrical, Computer and Software Engineering (housed in separate buildings). The building is composed of seven blocks listed as Engineering A - G. The majority of engineering specific courses are also held in the lecture halls within this building.

Other notable facilities in the main building include the Machine Shop, the M.A. Ward Civil Engineering Labs, the Engineering Students Society office, and the "Engg Lounge". As many of the first year engineering courses (which are identical for all departments) take place here, a principal hallway in this building is often referred to as "The First Year Hole".

==== Canadian Natural Resources Limited Engineering Complex ====
The Canadian Natural Resources Limited Engineering Complex is the newest addition to the main engineering complex. Officially opened to the public in November 2016 (it had been used for classes and labs since September 2016), the CNRL complex is a $174 million building meant to increase enrollment capacity in the engineering department by 400 seats and to provide new classroom and lecture hall facilities. The building was named in honor Canadian Natural Resources Limited for the company's $7 million donation, the largest single donation the University of Calgary has received to date. The building is 18,300 square meters and provides classrooms and undergraduate design labs on the bottom two floors. On the upper floors, new research labs will be used to support research in clean energy technology and renewable energy sources.

==== Machine Shop ====
The machine shop in the Schulich School of Engineering came into existence with the school in 1966, and provides a variety of mechanical construction services to the students and faculty members. The shop provides a variety of services, including CNC machining, manual machining, fabrication, and carpentry.

==== M.A. Ward Civil Engineering Labs ====
The civil engineering laboratory is located in a cavernous space in the south-westernmost block of the main complex. It is the main experimental space for the civil engineering faculty (along with the bay in CCIT) and can supports many separate endeavors at one time. While it is generally closed off to the main student body, there are always viewing windows on the second floor.

==== Engineering Students Society Office ====
The Engineering Students Society (ESS) is a non-profit organization that is run by students within the faculty to provide student activities, academic help and student-professional interaction. It is a member of the Canadian Federation of Engineering Students and sends representatives to various conferences and meets throughout the country. At the office, students can purchase books containing past exams for their classes, laboratory notebooks, T-shirts, sweatshirts, and tickets for events run by the different student organizations within engineering.

==== The Engg Lounge ====
The Engineering Student Lounge is the central social gathering area at the Schulich School of Engineering. During the fall and winter semesters, especially at 12:00 PM, the lounge is normally a hive of activity, as a vast majority of students come by to socialize and eat. The lounge is also notable for P.O.E.T.S., or Piss On Everything, Tomorrow's Saturday, a weekly Friday gathering of engineers (beginning at 3:00 PM, and ending at 6:00 PM), originally created by Dean Rhodes and put on by the Engineering Students Society. P.O.E.T.S. is a place for engineering students (and even sometimes professors) to unwind at the end of the school week and enjoy "cheaper" cold beer and occasionally live music, as well as a weekly event such as Minnow Races, Jeopardy, Eng. Olympics, etc.

=== Information Communications Technology Building ===
The ICT building is shared by the Schulich School of Engineering with the Department of Computer Science from the Faculty of Science. The building houses the majority of the Department of Electrical, Computer, and Software Engineering in the form of several lecture halls, computer labs and electronics labs.

The ground level of ICT is arranged as a food court themed meeting area, frequented by many faculties. Commercial services such as Family Mart, Good Earth Cafe and Apex Credit Union occupy the bottom floor.

==== Electronics Labs ====
The ICT building features ultramodern electronics labs for electrical and computer engineering students. These include labs for second and third year students, and the Telus Microwave Research Laboratory for microwave antenna design and research.

=== Mechanical Engineering Building (Petro Canada Building) ===
The Mechanical Engineering building houses the Department of Mechanical and Manufacturing at the Schulich School of Engineering. It was donated to the faculty of engineering by Petro-Canada. Unlike the rest of the engineering faculty, it is not physically connected but in fact resides in a separate building across 32nd Ave NW in the university's research park. It contains many labs and offices for faculty and grad students, as well as the mechanical engineering shop. It also functions as the headquarters for the University of Calgary's Formula SAE and Baja SAE racecar teams. The mechanical engineering department at UCalgary is one of the largest in Canada with around 150 graduate students and 350 undergraduates. The buildings contains three computer labs with over 40 computers in total, a study room which seats approximately 8 students, and a newly renovated recreation room, complete with two Foosball tables, that seats approximately 12 students.

==== Mechanical Engineering Shop ====
The MES is located at the easternmost end of the ME building and contains a variety of tools and equipment for building and testing research projects in the mechanical engineering department. As of 2010, the mechanical engineering shop has been severely downsized with a reduction in staff and equipment. Various labs for the mechanical department are held here such as doing tests on a four-cylinder Toyota engine.

=== Energy, Environment, & Experiential Learning Building (EEEL) ===
Though primarily used by the Faculty of Science, the EEEL building hosts a few lab facilities and the Dean's Office for the engineering department. Located just north of the ICT Building, EEEL contains many lab facilities and lecture halls along with office space on the upper floors and a coffee shop on the main floor. Due to construction of the CNRL complex, the Dean's Office was moved to the fourth floor of the EEEL building.

== Supercow, Official Mascot of the University of Calgary Engineering Students' Society ==
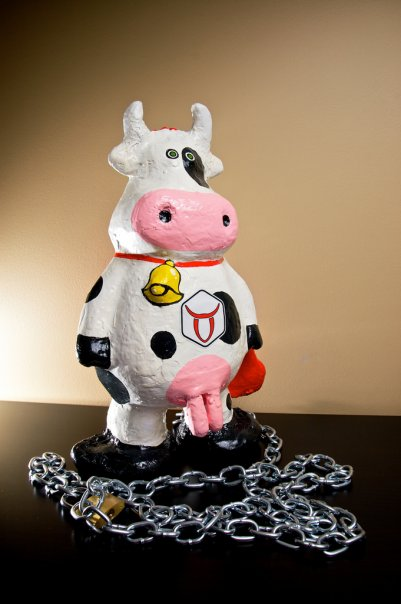
Supercow

Supercow is a prominent figure in school spirit activities that boost team building and trust among engineering students moving toward a professional career in engineering. Supercow travels to numerous national engineering conferences and competitions, hosted by the Western Engineering Students' Societies Team, and the Canadian Federation of Engineering Students.

Supercow appears in many publications created by the Engineering Students' Society. Supercow has appeared on the cover of the 2003 through 2009 Cogwheels, a daily planner created by engineering students for engineering students, including forty pages of common engineering formulas. The 2007 - 2009 Engineering Students' Society sponsorship packages, sent to professional engineering firms in the city of Calgary, also contain a picture of Supercow. Supercow is featured on various pictures in the Engineering Photo archive.

== Programs ==
- Engineering Internship Program
- Chemical Engineering
- Civil Engineering
- Electrical Engineering
- Geomatics Engineering
- Mechanical Engineering
- Software Engineering
- Biomedical engineering
- Sustainable System Engineering
- Engineering Physics
- Biomedical Engineering Minor
- Energy Specialization
- Aerospace Engineering Minor
- Mechatronics Engineering Minor
- Manufacturing Engineering Minor
- Petroleum Engineering Minor
- Transportation Engineering Minor
- Structural Engineering Minor
- Environmental Engineering Minor
- Entrepreneurship and Enterprise Development Minor
- Management and Society Minor
- Digital Engineering Minor
