= University of Calgary =

Public research university in Canada

- Coat of arms
- Former names: Normal School (1905–1913); Calgary Normal School (1913–1945); Calgary Branch of the Faculty of Education of the University of Alberta (1945–1958); University of Alberta in Calgary (1958–1966) (Note: The following are names of the predecessor institution which the University of Calgary originates from, prior to its reorganization as a standalone university.)
- Motto: Mo Shùile Togam Suas (Gaelic)
- Motto in English: I will lift up my eyes
- Type: Public research university
- Established: 26 April 1966 (60 years ago)
- Academic affiliations: CARL, CUSID, IAU, Universities Canada, U15
- Endowment: CA$1.176 billion (2023)
- Chancellor: Jon Cornish
- President: Ed McCauley
- Provost: Sandra Davidson
- Faculty: 1,848
- Administrative staff: 3,116
- Students: 35,582 (2023–24 fulltime equivalent)
- Undergraduates: 30,400
- Postgraduates: 7,776
- Location: Calgary, Alberta, Canada; 51.0787°N 114.1331°W
- Campus: Urban, 4.13 km^{2} (1.59 sq mi)
- Colours: Red, gold, and black
- Nickname: Dinos
- Sporting affiliations: U Sports, CWUAA
- Mascot: Rex O'Saurus the Tyrannosaurus
- Website: ucalgary.ca/

The University of Calgary (U of C or UCalgary) is a public research university located in Calgary, Alberta, Canada. The University of Calgary started in 1944 as the Calgary branch of the University of Alberta, founded in 1908, prior to being instituted into a separate, autonomous university in 1966. It is composed of 14 faculties and over 85 research institutes and centres. The main campus is located in the northwest quadrant of the city near the Bow River and a smaller south campus is located in the city centre. The main campus houses most of the research facilities and works with provincial and federal research and regulatory agencies, several of which are housed next to the campus such as the Geological Survey of Canada. The main campus covers about 200 hectares (490 acres).

A member of the U15, the University of Calgary is also one of Canada's top research universities (with the faculty holding 80 Canada Research Chair positions). The university has a sponsored research revenue of $380.4 million, with total revenues exceeding $1.2 billion. The university maintains close ties to the petroleum and geoscience industry through the Department of Geosciences and the Schulich School of Engineering. The university also maintains several other departments and faculties, including the Cumming School of Medicine, the Faculty of Arts, the School of Public Policy, the Faculty of Law, and the Haskayne School of Business.

Notable former students include Canadian Prime Minister Stephen Harper, Java programming language creator James Gosling, Uber co-founder Garrett Camp, astronaut Robert Thirsk, and Lululemon Athletica founder Chip Wilson. The university has produced over 170,000 alumni who reside in 152 countries.

== History ==
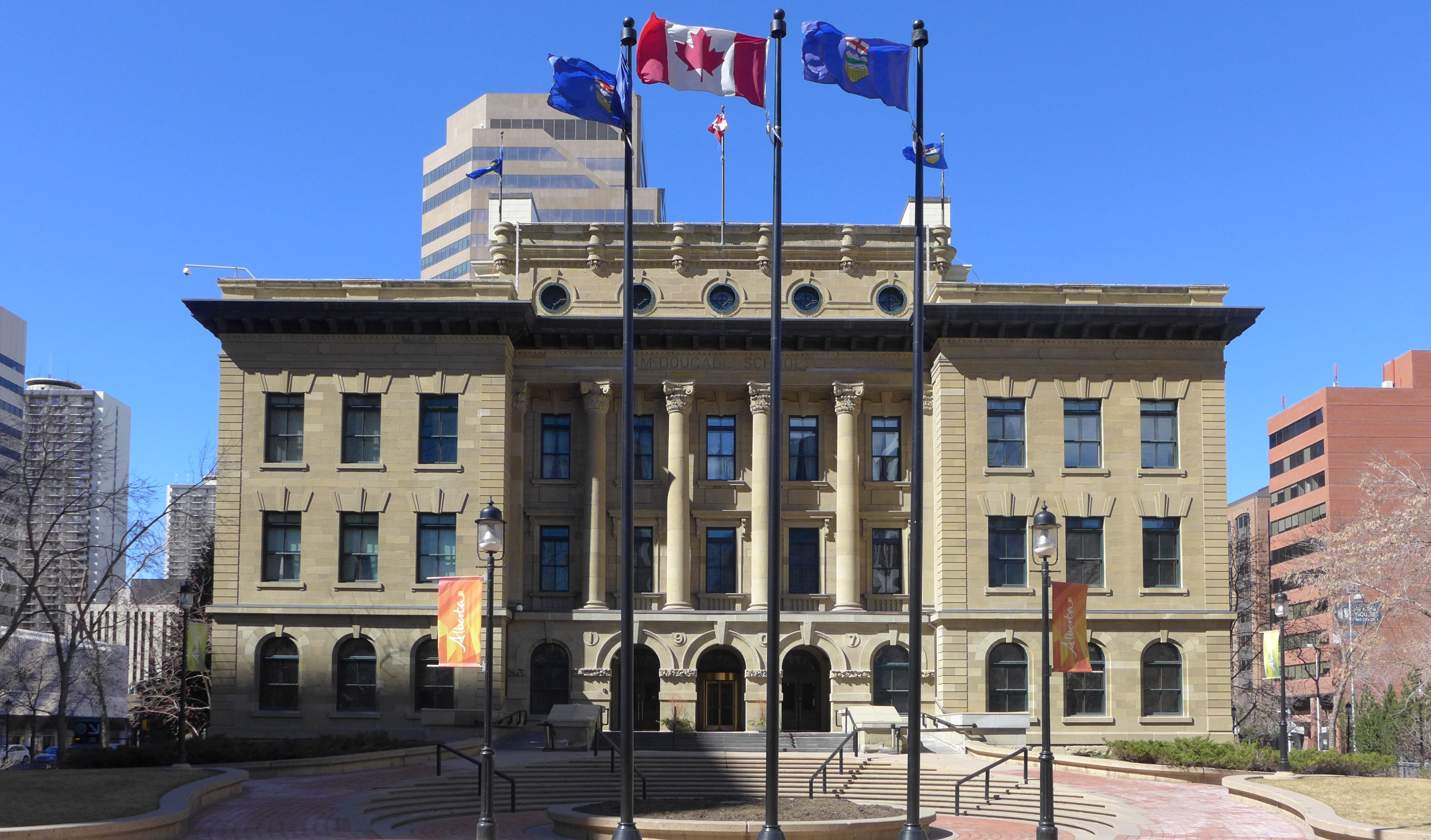
The McDougall Centre was built in 1907 for use by the Calgary Normal School. The school merged with the University of Alberta Calgary branch in 1945, the predecessor of the University of Calgary.

The University of Calgary was established in 1966, which is the official date for when it was granted autonomy. However, its roots date back more than half a century earlier to the establishment of the Normal School in Calgary in 1905. The Alberta Normal School was established in Calgary to train primary and secondary school teachers in the new province. The Calgary Normal School was absorbed by the University of Alberta's Faculty of Education in 1945, and operated as a part of its Calgary branch campus, a satellite campus of the University of Alberta. Operating from the west wing of the Provincial Institute of Technology and Art, the Calgary University Committee was formed 1946, in an effort to lobby for separate permanent facilities for the branch campus.

In July 1957, the University of Alberta signed a one dollar lease with the City of Calgary, for 121.4 hectares (300 acres) of land. In 1958, the University of Alberta changed the name of the branch campus to the "University of Alberta in Calgary," and unveiled plans for new permanent facilities on the leased land. The new campus opened its first permanent facilities in October 1960, the Arts and Education Building (presently the Administration Building), and the Science and Engineering Building (presently Science A).

In May 1965, the satellite campus was granted academic and financial autonomy from the University of Alberta. In the following year, in April 1966, the institution was formally made into an independent university, with the passage of the Universities Act by the Legislative Assembly of Alberta. The university was modelled on the American state university (similar to the University of Alberta), with an emphasis on extension work and applied research. The governance was modelled on the provincial University of Toronto Act of 1906 which established a bicameral system of university government consisting of a senate (faculty), responsible for academic policy, and a board of governors (citizens) exercising exclusive control over financial policy and having formal authority in all other matters. The president, appointed by the board, was a link between the bodies to perform institutional leadership.

In the early 20th century, professional education expanded beyond theology, law and medicine. Graduate training based on the German-inspired American model of specialized course work and the completion of a research thesis was introduced. The university's first president, Herbert Stoker Armstrong, held a strong belief that "although the university is accountable to the society that supports it, the university must insist on playing a leadership role in intellectual matters if it is to be worthy of the name."

During the late 1960s, the University of Calgary's campus expanded dramatically with new buildings for engineering and science, the opening of the new University Theatre in Calgary Hall and, in 1971, the launch of the program in architecture. In addition, the Banff Centre (originally known as The Banff School of Fine Arts) affiliated with the University of Calgary in 1966.

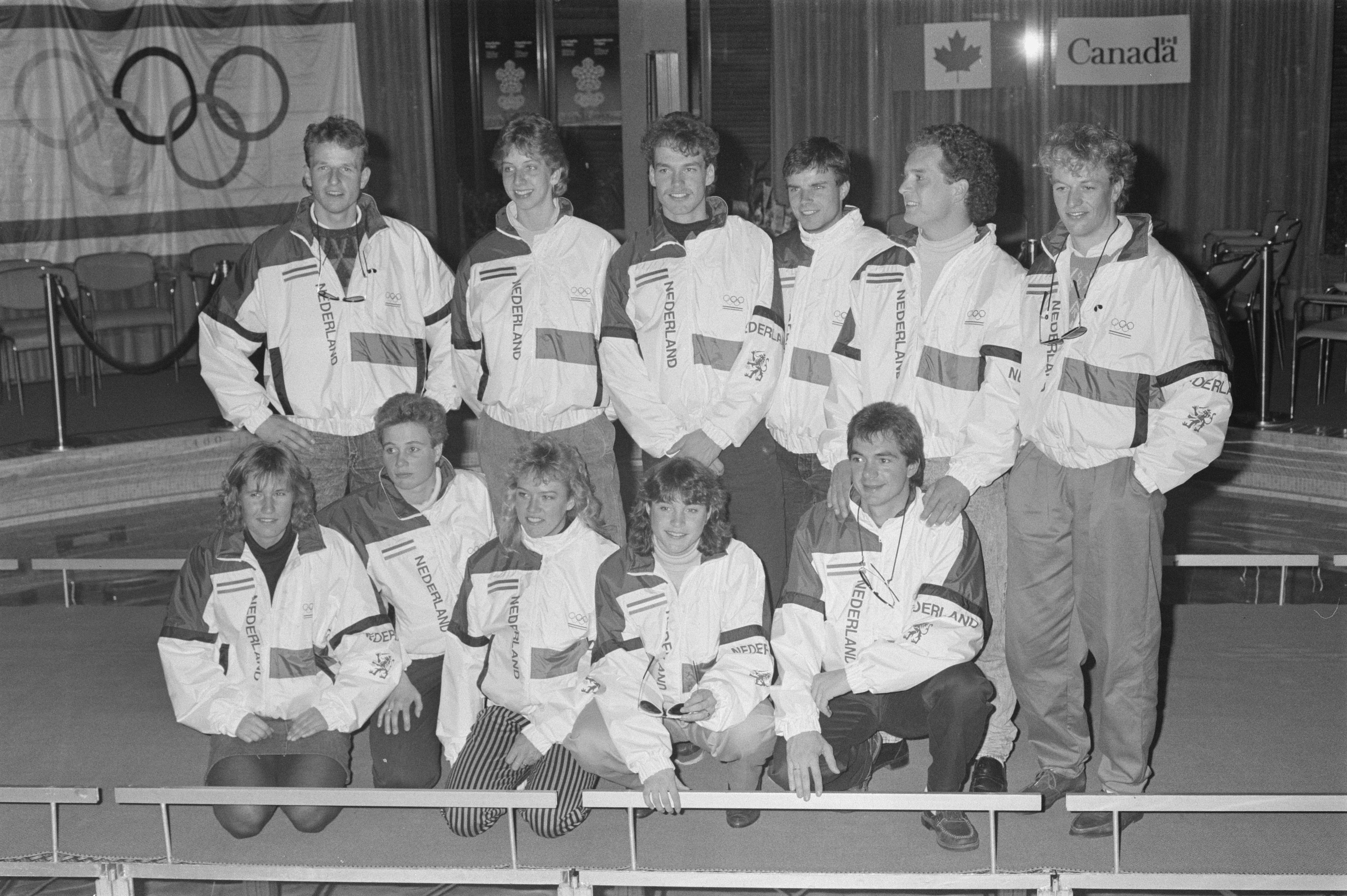
The Dutch speed skating team at the 1988 Winter Olympics. Olympic speed skating events were held at the university's Olympic Oval.

The University of Calgary played a central role in facilitating and hosting Canada's first winter olympic games, the XV Olympic Winter Games in 1988.

=== 21st century ===
In May 2001, the University of Calgary tartan was accredited in a ceremony presided over by the president of the Scottish Tartans Society, and the director of the Register of All Publicly Known Tartans. The accreditation ceremony for the university's tartan was the first to take place in Canada. Use of the black, red, and gold tartan is limited to formal ceremonies, convocations, and a small number of items sold by the university. The tartan is also used by the university's pipe band.

The school was the target of a ransomware attack in 2016. The university paid a $20,000 ransom to the cyber criminals. The FBI charged the alleged Iranian hackers in 2018.

On January 4, 2018, 21-year-old Connor Neurauter was sentenced to 90 days in jail and two years probation, and had to register as a sex offender in Kamloops, B.C. It was then revealed that Neurauter would not serve his sentence until May 2018, in order to allow him to finish his semester at the University of Calgary. On January 6, the University of Calgary said that they were "reviewing the situation" and he had been advised to not be on campus the week of January 8. On January 9, a petition on change.org was started and as of January 12, had obtained over 65,000 signatures calling for the University of Calgary to expel him. The University of Calgary released a statement on January 11 stating they had no plans to expel Neurauter, but saying he had been advised to stay off campus for the remainder of the semester and that he would be escorted off campus if he appeared. The university received criticism for its decision to not expel Neurauter and its handling of the case in light of its new sexual assault policy. The decision to have Neurauter's sentence delayed in order for him to attend has also received criticism.

==== West Campus Development Project ====
In 2007, the University of Calgary, in partnership with the City of Calgary, began work on the West Campus Development Project through the West Campus Development Trust. As the lead developer for University District, the trust will oversee the development of the lands adjacent to the main campus, formerly known as the West Campus lands.

The primary goal of the trust is to manage the transforming of previously unused University lands, with the ultimate aim to generate a financial return on investment for the university's academic mission. Once completed, University District, situated between the university and Shaganappi Trail, will be a mixed-use, 200-acre community consisting of residential, office, retail and park spaces. As of 2021, a number of condominium and commercial buildings had been completed, with commercial development anchored by a major grocery store.

==== MacKimmie Complex Redevelopment Project ====
The MacKimmie Complex and Professional Faculties Redevelopment Project is an ongoing multi-phase project to enhance the university's administrative and academic environments. The completed project will include the construction of new classrooms, centralized student services, student study space, and expanded academic research space. The new block also serves as the home for the Hunter Hub for Entrepreneurial Thinking.

Initial funding for project design and planning was announced in April 2016 by the Government of Alberta. On March 23, 2017, an additional amount of $262.8M was announced by the Government to be allocated over the next four years for the MacKimmie Complex and Professional Faculties Building Redevelopment.

== Administration ==
The governance of the University of Calgary is conducted through a board of governors and a senate. The role of the board of governors and the senate is governed under the Post Secondary Learning Act, a provincial act of the Legislative Assembly of Alberta. The board of governors is responsible for the university's conduct, management, and control of the university and its property, revenues, business, and other affairs. Members of the board of governors include the chancellor of the university, the university president, two alumni nominated by the alumni association, a member of the university senate, nine members of the general public, as well as three students, and three staff members nominated by their respective associations.

The University Senate acts as an outreach body between the university and the wider community. The university's senate is made up of 62 members of the alumni association, academic staff, the student body, and the general public, as identified by the Post-Secondary Learning Act. Members of the senate include various members of the university community, including the university president, the chief academic officer of student affairs, academic staff, as well a one undergraduate and graduate student appointed by their respective student association. In addition to members of the university community, the senate also includes nine members of the general public, appointed by the Alberta Minister of Advanced Education. In relation to its mandate, the university senate is also the governing body that authorizes issuance of honorary degrees.

The university senate is chaired by the university chancellor. In addition to chairing the senate, the chancellor also presides over all degree-conferring ceremonies, and acts as the ambassador for the university.

The university's support staff are represented by the Alberta Union of Provincial Employees, organized as Local 052 University of Calgary chapter. In October 2008, the University of Calgary was named one of "Canada's Top 100 Employers" by Mediacorp Canada Inc. Later that month, the university was also named one of Alberta's Top Employers.

In November 2025, it was reported that the university would lose $34.7 million for the 2025/26 academic year due to a decline in international student enrolment.

== Academics ==
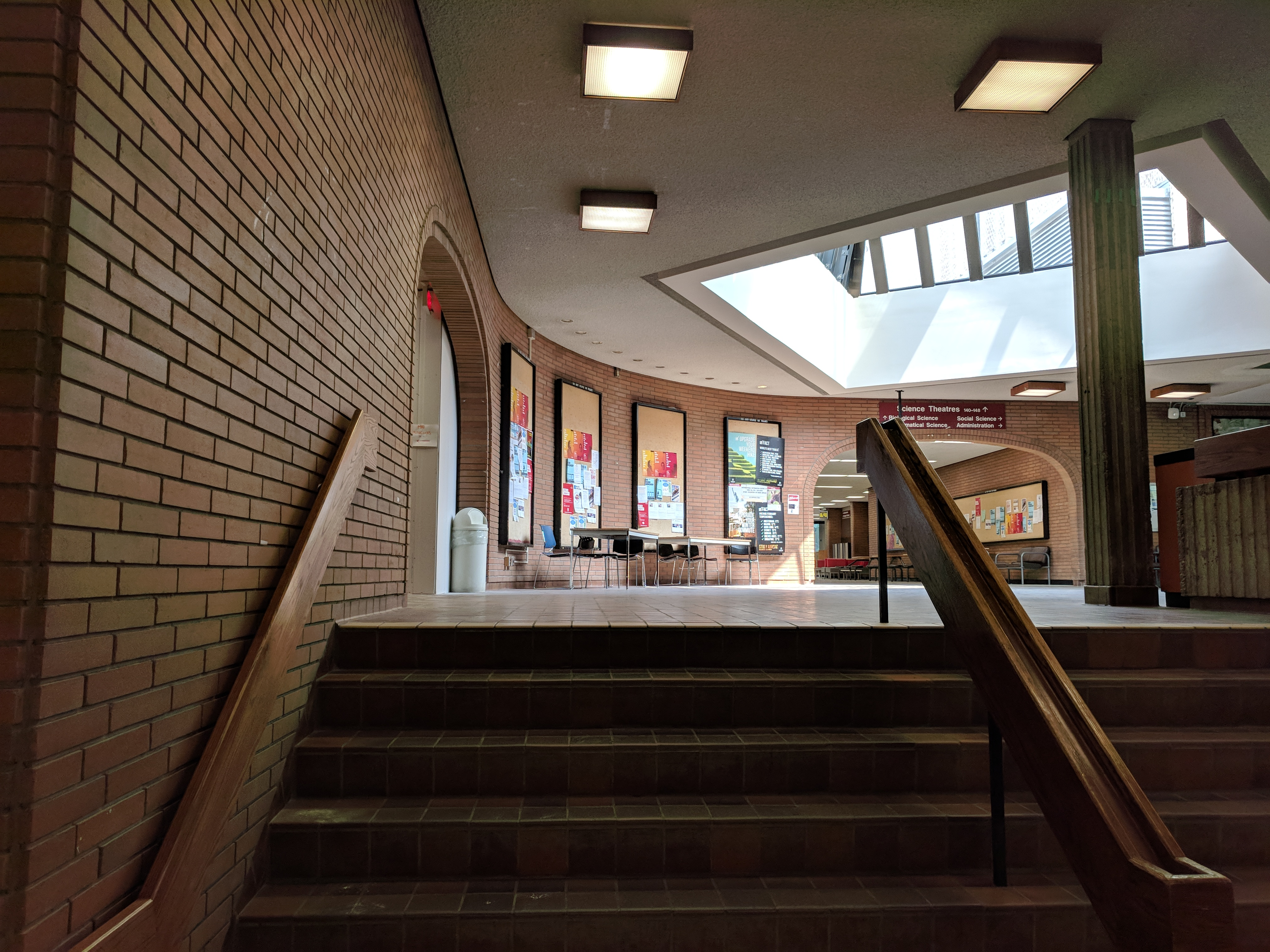
Science Theatres is home to the natural sciences, social sciences, and humanities.

The university offers 250 programs in post-secondary education awarding bachelors, masters, and doctorate (PhD) degrees. The University of Calgary has developed a wide range of undergraduate and graduate programs. The campus has an area of 200 hectares (490 acres) and hosts 14 faculties, 55 departments and 85 research institutes and centre (see Canadian university scientific research organizations).

The university is accredited through Alberta's Post-Secondary Learning Act and is considered a "comprehensive academic and research university" (CARU). CARUs offer a range of academic and professional programs, which generally lead to undergraduate and graduate level credentials, and have a strong research focus.

=== Faculties ===
The University of Calgary's faculties are:

- Cumming School of Medicine
- Faculty of Arts
- School of Architecture, Planning and Landscape (SAPL)
- Faculty of Graduate Studies
- Faculty of Kinesiology
- Faculty of Law
- Faculty of Nursing
- Faculty of Science
- Faculty of Social Work
- Faculty of Veterinary Medicine
- Haskayne School of Business
- Schulich School of Engineering
- Werklund School of Education

=== Libraries and Cultural Resources ===
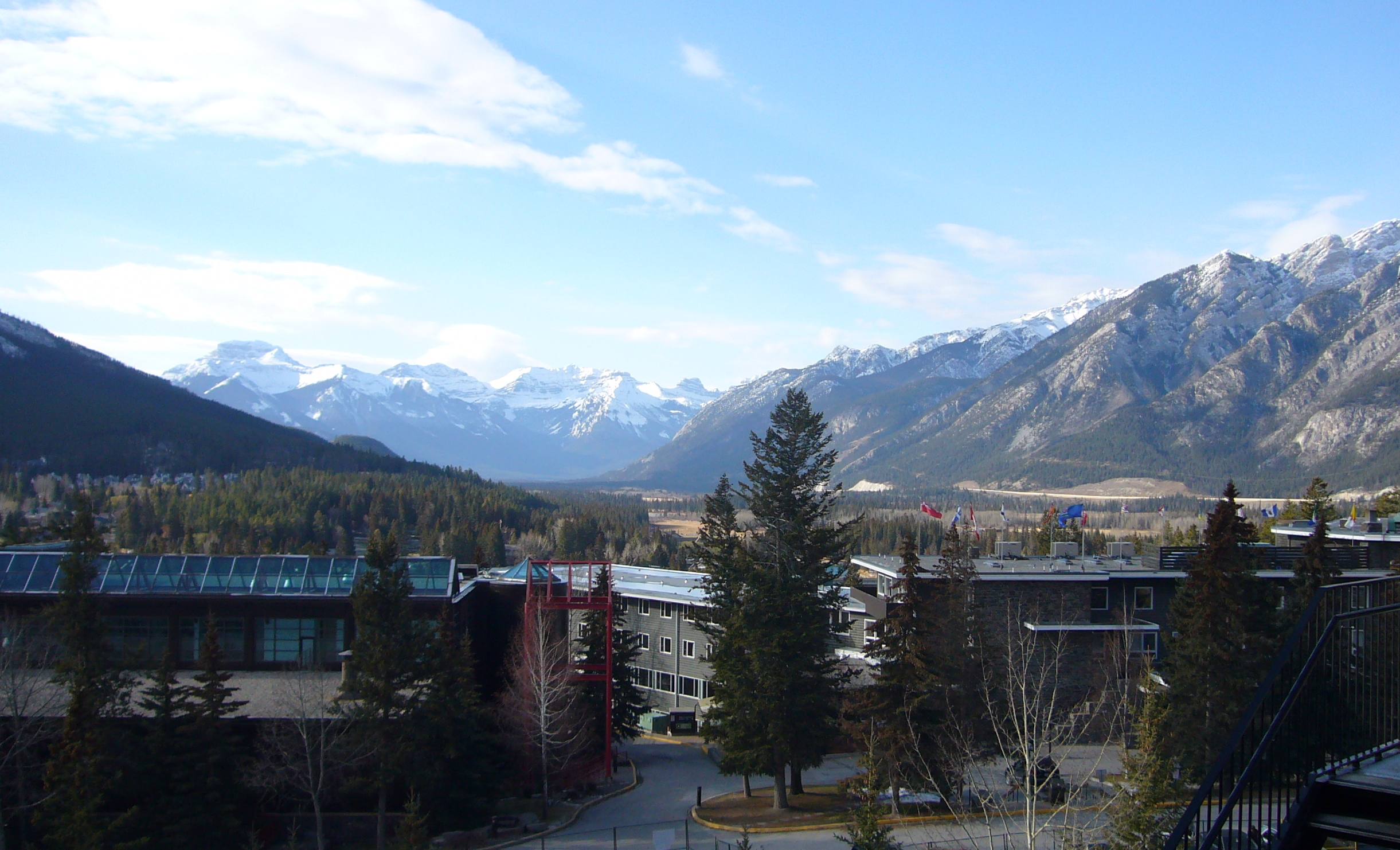
The Banff Centre for Arts and Creativity in Banff, Alberta has been associated with the University of Calgary since 1966.

Libraries and Cultural Resources (LCR) includes eight libraries, two art galleries, Archives and Special Collections, the University of Calgary Copyright Office, Research Data Centre and the University of Calgary Press.

MacKimmie library was the first library to open at the University of Calgary in 1966. Since then, five different library branches have been opened in order to provide students with a greater amount of literary choice in many subjects. In addition, the University of Calgary has the first library system in North America to contain a video game library. Over 3.7 million printed volumes combined with online access to more than 300,000 full-text electronic journals and more than 800 electronic databases are available at the university. As of 2012, the library system is the eighth largest, by the number of volumes held, in Canada. In 2011–2012 the university library was rated 43rd in North America for Total Library Expenditures by the Association of Research Libraries.

==== Branch libraries ====
The library system at the University of Calgary has eight library locations in total:

- Taylor Family Digital Library – contains the greatest share of the library system's printed volumes, as well as rare special items like a gaming collection. In 2011 The Taylor Family Digital Library replaced, as the university's primary facility, the MacKimmie Library, which is no longer used as a library.
  - Data Library
  - Canadian Architectural Archives
  - Fine Arts and Visual Resources
- High Density Library – located at the university's Spy Hill Campus, serves as a climate-controlled repository for lesser-used materials, which may be called-back for use as required.
- Business Library
- Doucette Education Library
- Bennett Jones Law Library
- Health Sciences Library
- Gallagher Library (Sciences and Engineering)
- The Military Museums Library and Archives

==== Taylor Family Digital Library ====
The Taylor Family Digital Library (TFDL) is a convergence of libraries, historical archives, arts museum, scholarly publishing, and student academic support services. The TFDL was officially launched on October 20, 2011. The TFDL allows the full re-engineering of the university's library system, creating more and better space for teaching and learning resources, while moving the majority of the University of Calgary's growing collection off campus to a high-density library. In addition, The TFDL offers books and online resources, a large Learning Commons with café, workrooms, film and audio rooms, editing and recording suites, multimedia labs, quiet study areas, and seminar and consultation space for academic growth.

Don and Ruth Taylor (couple), longtime supporters of the University of Calgary, donated $25 million in December, 2006 to help build the new digital library. In recognition of the gift, the board of governors of the university named the library the Taylor Family Digital Library (TFDL).

In addition, the gift will also be used to create the Taylor Quadrangle, a green space in the centre of campus adjacent to the TFDL.

The Taylor Family Digital Library is home to the Nickle Galleries, formerly known as the Nickle Arts Museum, which features exhibits of contemporary art, as well as rugs, textiles, and numismatic items from its collections. Many events are also held there, ranging from tours to recorded talks.

=== Taylor Institute for Teaching and Learning ===
In celebration of the university's 50th anniversary, the University of Calgary launched the Taylor Institute for Teaching and Learning (TITL), which was built on the site of the former Nickle Arts Museum.

The building was constructed as a two-storey, 4,000 m^{2} environmentally sustainable building to accommodate the increasing the needs of the university. It features advanced teaching technology tools, mock classrooms, a simulation centre for teaching, public lecture space, and multipurpose facilities.

The TITL provides education and teaching workshops and events for teachers and students to attend and further refine their educational goals. The institute also confers several awards and grants, including the University of Calgary Teaching Award and the PURE Awards for undergraduate research.

=== Innovate Calgary ===
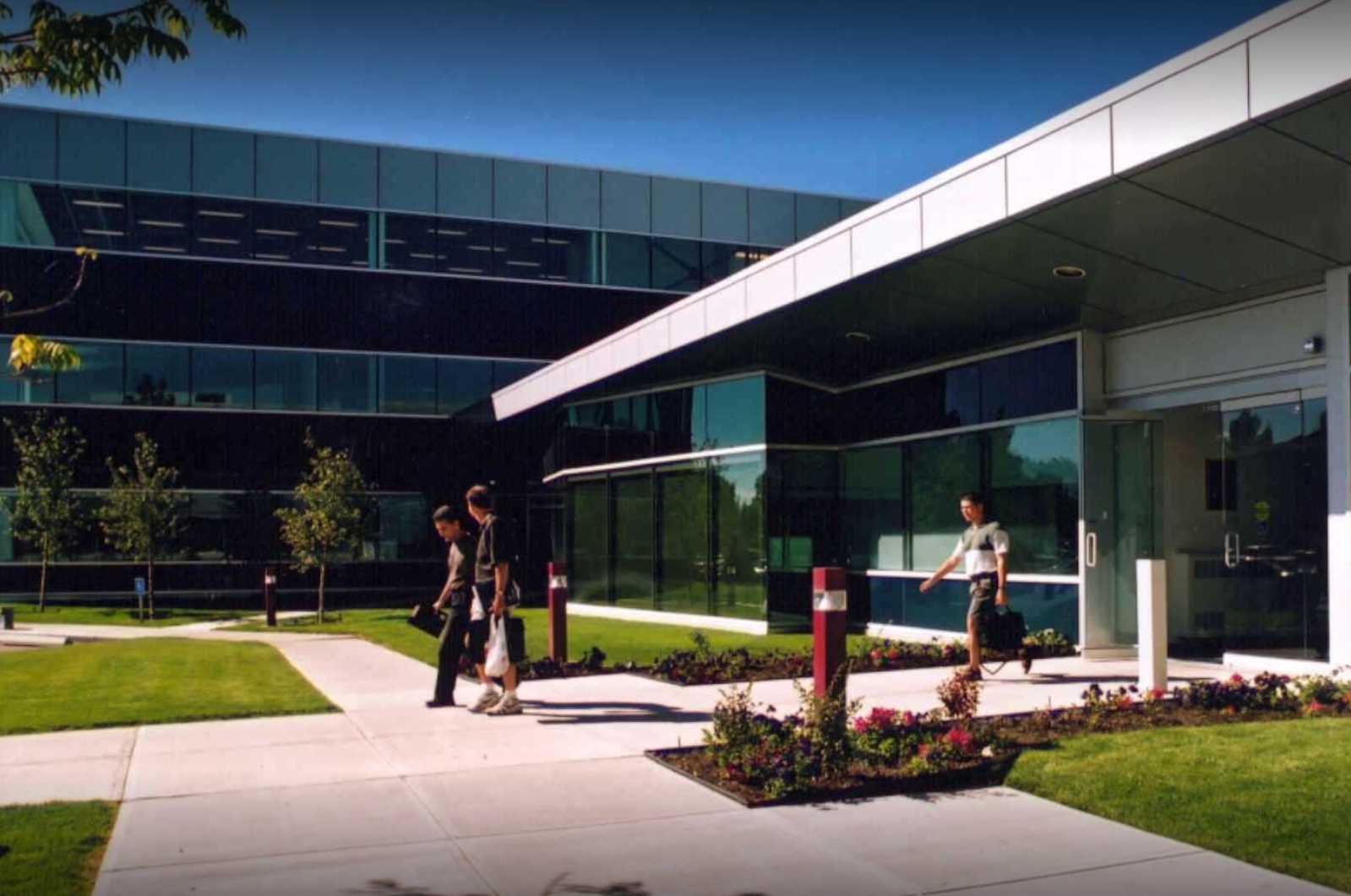
Entrance to Innovate Calgary, the University of Calgary's business incubator.

The University of Calgary announced in 2010 the creation of a dedicated university-based incubator to provide working space and laboratory access for university spin-offs. The resulting incubator, known as Innovate Calgary, is based out of the 170,000-square-foot Alastair Ross Technology Centre located within the innovation research park. The research park is adjacent to the primary main campus and is open to any university-linked entrepreneurs.

Opportunity Calgary Investment Fund (OCIF) donated over $8.5M to help provide programs and support for university linked startups. In addition to providing startup programs and services, Innovate Calgary also operates as the tech transfer office for the university by providing Intellectual property (IP) support and services. Innovate Calgary has an informal partnership with Creative Destruction Lab (CDL) to identify and support regional startups with demonstrated potential.

=== Rankings and reputation ===
University rankings

World rankings
- ARWU World: 151–200
- QS World: 211
- QS Employability: 131–140
- THE World: 185
- USNWR World: =206
- 6–8

Canadian rankings
- QS National: 11
- THE National: 9–10
- USNWR National: 8
- Maclean's Medical/Doctoral: 5
- Maclean's Reputation: 8

The University of Calgary has ranked in a number of post-secondary rankings. Maclean's placed Calgary fifth in its 2026 Canadian medical-doctoral universities rankings. The 2024 QS World University Rankings ranked the university 182 in the world, and eighth in Canada. In the 2022 Academic Ranking of World Universities rankings, the university ranked 151–200 in the world and 7–8 in Canada. The 2023 Times Higher Education World University Rankings ranked the university 201–250 in the world, and 8–10 in Canada. In the 2022–23 U.S. News & World Report Best Global University Ranking, the university ranked 175th in the world, and seventh in Canada.

The university's research performance has been noted in several bibliometric university rankings, which uses citation analysis to evaluates the impact a university has on academic publications. In 2019, the Performance Ranking of Scientific Papers for World Universities ranked the university 132nd in the world, and seventh in Canada. The University Ranking by Academic Performance 2018–19 rankings placed the university 139th in the world, and seventh in Canada.

Along with academic and research-based rankings, the university has also been ranked by publications that evaluate the employment prospects of its graduates. In QS's 2022 graduate employability ranking, the university ranked 131–140 in the world, and seventh in Canada.

=== Affiliations and partnerships ===
In 2022, the university formed an international university alliance with the University of Aberdeen in Scotland, United Kingdom and Curtin University in Perth, Australia to address global challenges together. The alliance provides joint research centres, collaborative academic programs, industry linkage, and student and staff mobility exchanges. Calgary is also a member of the U15, a group of prominent research universities within Canada.

== Campuses ==
=== Main Campus ===
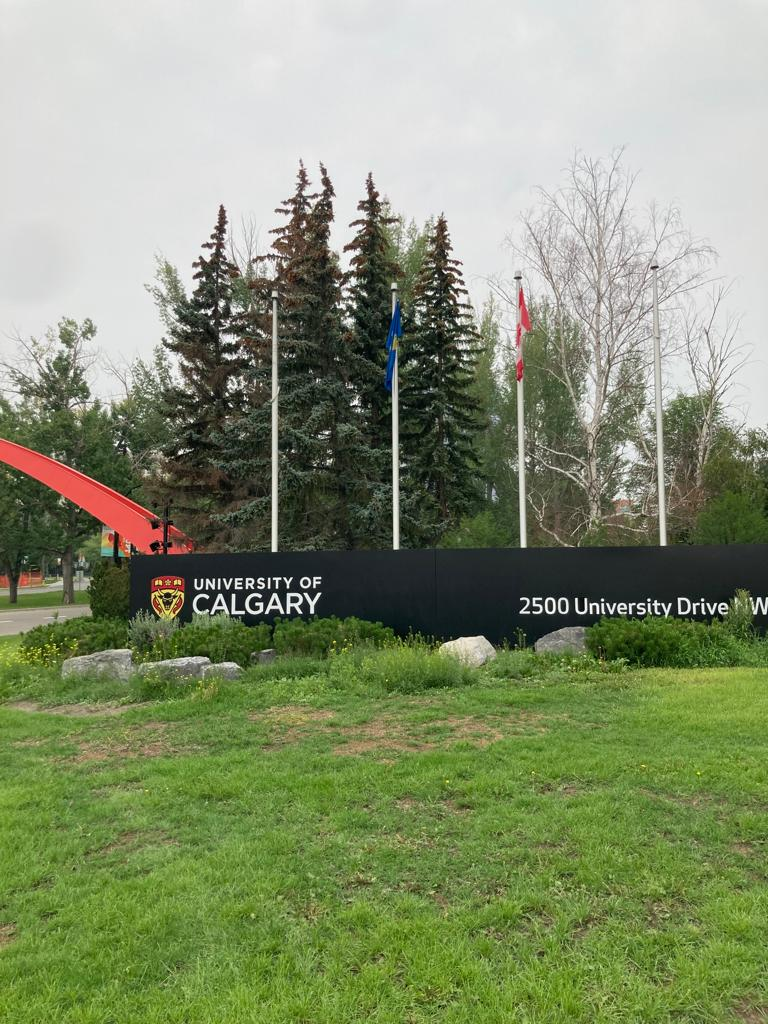
University of Calgary main campus entrance

The university grounds lie about 10 kilometres (6.2 mi) northwest of Downtown Calgary, and immediately south of the neighbourhood of Varsity. The University of Calgary campus occupies 213 hectares (530 acres) or 2.13 km^{2} (0.82 sq mi), an area larger than Calgary's entire downtown. The campus is bounded by Crowchild Trail, 32 Avenue NW, Shaganappi Trail NW, and 24 Avenue N.W..

The architecture is defined by a combination of Brutalist and Postmodern buildings spread across campus, most of them built between 1960 and 1980. In 2016, the campus finished repurposing and renovating the Canadian Natural Resources Limited Engineering Complex situated within the Schulich School of Engineering. In 2017, the university has recently started on rehabilitating the aging MacKimmie Complex.

The main campus is connected to Calgary's C-Train light-rail system at University Station.

A large park is built in the centre of the main campus, and is home to several specially commissioned sculptures. In addition, a pond surrounded by benches and an open field is available. The park contains old oak trees which were specially transplanted to the location when the university was opened. Together, they form a considerable amount of tree canopies which add a more natural feeling to the campus.

=== West Campus ===
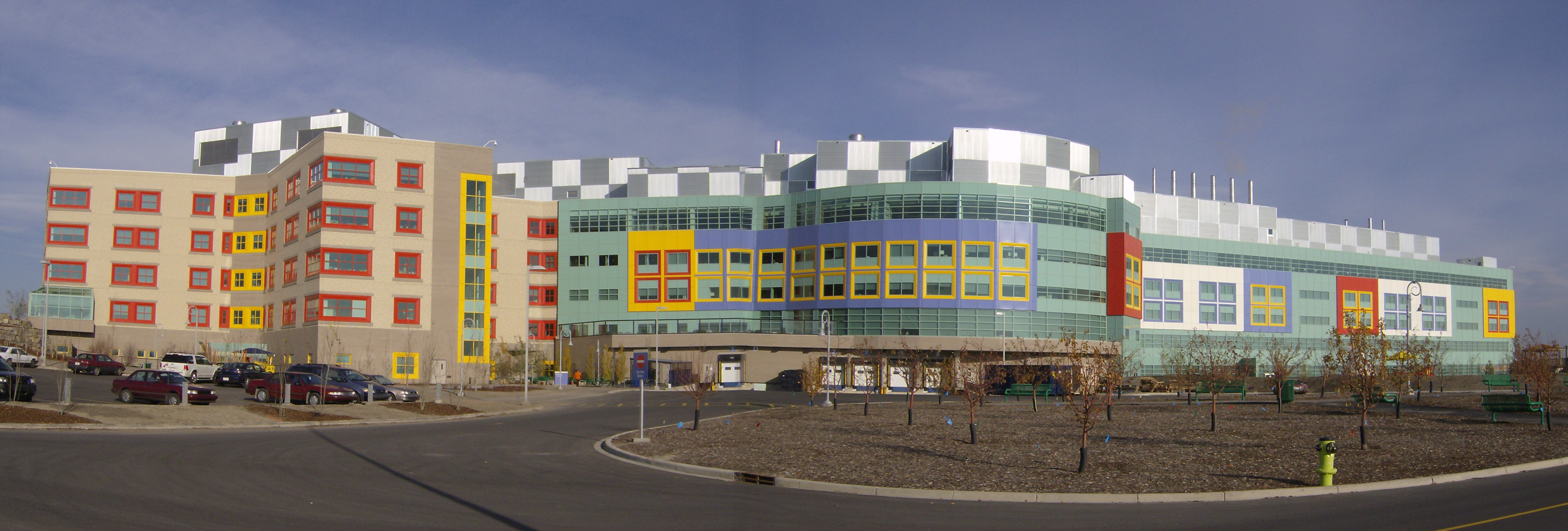
The Alberta Children's Hospital is an affiliated hospital of the university, located in the West Campus.

In 1995, the Province of Alberta gave the University of Calgary a large tract of land west of the Main Campus with the understanding it would be used in the future to advance the university's mission, vision, values and priorities. About a third of the size of downtown Calgary, the land overlooks the Bow River valley and covers 80 hectares (198 acres) east of Shaganappi Trail between 16th Avenue (TransCanada Highway) and 32 Avenue N.W. The western campus lies on mostly hilly terrain, near the Bow River. It is adjacent to the main campus of the university, and is home to the Alberta Children's Hospital and Child Development Centre. With the recent boost in annual funding, the university has begun a development plan in order to make better use of the remaining space. Dubbed the University District, the area is to include a mixture of residential and commercial development.

Part of the West Campus was leased for the new Alberta Children's Hospital and a new Ronald McDonald House. Currently, the campus is only halfway developed and is considered building room for the future. From this location, it is possible to see the entire university and also Downtown Calgary.

=== Health Sciences Campus ===
The University of Calgary Board of Governors chose to launch a medical school in the late 1960s, with the first tangible building to house this endeavor being the Health Sciences Building, which opened in 1972. The Health Sciences Building shared a site with the Foothills Medical Centre some distance south of the Main Campus. This site became known as the Health Sciences Campus, with subsequent additions being the Heritage Medical Building (opened 1987), the Health Research Innovation Centre and the Teaching, Research and Wellness building.

The Snyder Institute for Chronic Diseases is also housed there, and after an interruption of several years and in light of the COVID-19 pandemic reopened in November 2020 its Biosafety level 3 laboratory. The university received a $427,785 grant from the Government of Canada to promote COVID-19 vaccine confidence and competence in communication and uptake among health professionals in training.

=== Downtown Campus ===
On September 13, 2010, the University of Calgary opened its new downtown campus located at 8th Avenue and 8th Street S.W.. The building houses classes including Continuing Education, and energy & environment, as well as classes offered by the Haskayne School of Business and the School of Public Policy. It also houses administrative offices for the Development and Alumni Engagement division and the main office of the University of Calgary Alumni association; beginning in 2020, however, most of these personnel were relocated to the Main Campus. It also includes a conference centre. At one point it also included a branch of the university library, but this was decommissioned and converted into additional student study space in 2016. The University of Alberta currently houses its MSc Physical Therapy – Calgary program in this building.

==== School of Public Policy ====
The School of Public Policy is an institute at the University of Calgary and was founded in 2008 and now based out of the Downtown Campus. The school is devoted to public policy research and education, and is led by economist Dr. Jack Mintz who is cross-appointed to the Faculty of Law. It is home to over 60 faculty and fellows. The school is organized into three policy areas: Economic and Social Policy, Energy and Environmental Policy, and International Policy. Since 2012 the school has offered a graduate degree program, the Master of Public Policy. The degree is structured as a 12-month program involving two semesters of classroom-based learning and one semester of project work. Other degree programs offered include a joint Master of Business Administration/Master of Public Policy and a joint Juris Doctor/Master of Public Policy.

=== Spy Hill Campus ===
The university also operates a satellite campus in the far northwest corner of Calgary on 85 Street N.W. The campus is home to the university's new Faculty of Veterinary Medicine, and the High-Density Library, a climate-controlled warehouse for books and other printed material for which there is no longer storage room at the main library.

=== Qatar Campus ===
In 2007, the University of Calgary established a campus in Doha, Qatar, the University of Calgary in Qatar (UCQ), which currently focuses on nursing education. Throughout the program, students are provided with a theoretical base and supervised clinical experience in a variety of nursing practice settings.

The University of Calgary in Qatar offers two routes towards a Bachelor of Nursing (BN) degree:

- A Regular Track program for high school – Qatar transfer students (BNRT)
- A Post-Diploma program for students with an acceptable Nursing diploma (PDBN)

The University of Calgary in Qatar also offers a Diploma of Nursing program that launched in September 2012.

In addition, several graduate programs are expected to be phased in. Currently the University of Calgary in Qatar campus offers a Master of Nursing program which is sponsored by the Hamad Medical Corporation with focuses in Nursing Leadership and Oncology.

== Facilities ==
The university is home to MacEwan Hall Ballroom, a concert venue holding 1000 people. The Ballroom is also used for conferences, dinners, and political debates, including the 2006 Alberta PC leadership debate.

The university also has the Rozsa Centre, a theatre and concert hall on the southwest side of campus, off 24th Ave NW. The Rozsa Centre has a Bach organ built by Jürgen and Hendrik Ahrend. The Rozsa Centre hosts wind ensembles, choirs, and other fine arts. Musical competitions are held at every year and can host up to 384 people. The University Theatre, beside the Rozsa Centre, is designed for drama and dance with seating for 505 people.

The Olympic Oval ice arena was site of the 1988 Winter Olympic Games, the fastest ice in the world. It has a 400 m track oval as well as a short track and two ice hockey rinks. The campus also has the Jack Simpson Gymnasium, consisting of three gymnasiums with bleachers that cover the outer two courts capable of seating 2,700 people. The university campus also covers the McMahon Stadium, which is home to the Dinos Football Team and the Calgary Stampeders.

Many other sport facilities are also located at the University of Calgary. These include among others:

- University of Calgary Aquatic Centre: Contains an Olympic sized swimming pool with a deep end diving tank featuring two sparging units for a bubble machine which was used for springboard and platform divers, kayakers and general ocean simulated swims.
- Fitness Studios
- Dance Studio
- Weight Room: Equipment includes universal, free weights, global, hydra gym, nautilus.
- Climbing Walls
- Fitness and Lifestyle Centre: The physical facility offers members 3,750 m^{2} (40,365 sq ft) of space with fitness equipment.

== Athletics ==
The Calgary Dinos are the athletic teams that represent the University of Calgary in the Canada West, a division of U Sports, and in the Alberta Colleges Athletic Conference. They were known as the "Dinosaurs" but usually referred to as the "Dinos" until 1999, when the name was officially shortened. Some of its venues are the Jack Simpson Gymnasium (basketball, volleyball), McMahon Stadium (football, soccer), Olympic Oval (speed skating), Hawkings Field (field hockey), University of Calgary Aquatic Centre (swimming, often shortened to Aquatic Centre) and a 200 m Running Track (cross-country and track & field practice).

The Dinos compete in 14 varsity sports: basketball, cross-country, field hockey, football, golf, ice hockey, ringette, Women's rugby, soccer, swimming, tennis, track and field, volleyball, and wrestling. The Dinos also have club teams: Men's Baseball, Men's Rugby as well as Men's and Women's Rowing.

The men's hockey team plays at Father David Bauer Olympic Arena, while the women's hockey team's schedule is split between Bauer Arena and Olympic Oval. In rare cases of scheduling conflicts, both teams have used the Max Bell Centre for games.

The University of Calgary has been associated with the Olympics since 1972 when enrolled student and swimming team coach Ralph Hutton competed in Munich. Four years later, in 1976, the 10-year-old athletic department sent three athletes to Montreal. Since then, 42 Dinos athletes have competed at both the summer and winter Games, bringing home 11 medals, and UC hosted the athletes' village and speed skating events at the XV Olympic Winter Games in 1988.

The football team plays home matches at McMahon Stadium, home of CFL's Calgary Stampeders. It has won the Vanier Cup on five occasions, 1983, 1985, 1988, 1995 and 2019. In recent years, the team played in the Vanier Cup in 2009, 2010, 2013 and 2019.

== Media ==
=== Newspaper ===
The university has two main newspapers, UToday, and The Gauntlet. UToday is the online source for news about the University of Calgary, published by the department of University Relations in collaboration with the university's 14 faculties. Created in September 2008, UToday reports on research discoveries at the university, major events and milestones, campus happenings and personalities, and opportunities to get involved in learning or activities. It is published every weekday throughout the year. UToday's readers include students, faculty, staff, alumni, news media, donors, community leaders and partners, and residents at large.

The Gauntlet is the University of Calgary's monthly magazine publication, covering the campus and the Calgary community. First published in 1960 as a weekly student newspaper before its transition into a monthly magazine in 2017, it is primarily focused towards undergraduates.

The university also prints Libin Life, which is published by the Libin Cardiovascular Institute of Alberta.

=== Radio ===
CJSW is the university's campus radio station, broadcasting at 90.9 MHz FM. CJSW is a member of the National Campus and Community Radio Association and the University of Calgary Tri-Media Alliance in partnership with NUTV (the campus television station) and The Gauntlet (the campus newspaper). CJSW is a non-profit society maintained and operated by a group of four staff members and over 200 volunteers drawn from both the University of Calgary student body and the wider city of Calgary population. CJSW broadcasts music, spoken word and multicultural programming.

In addition to the FM broadcast, the station can be heard at 106.9 MHz cable FM, and via Ogg Vorbis stream from its web site. Select shows are also available for podcast download.

=== Television ===
NUTV is one of the oldest university-based television production societies in Canada. Established in 1983 and incorporated in 1991, NUTV is a campus-based non-profit organization. NUTV offers the opportunity to University of Calgary students and community members to explore the medium of television by learning the various stages of production. This includes reporting/interviewing; hosting; writing; camera operation; lighting; sound mixing; Final Cut Pro & Adobe Creative Suite editing; producing; and directing. NUTV is part of the University of Calgary Tri-Media Alliance, comprising print The Gauntlet, radio CJSW 90.9, and television (NUTV). The University of Calgary is unique in that it is the only Canadian university that houses three media operations on-campus.

=== Book publishing ===
The University of Calgary Press was founded in 1981 and to date has published over 400 titles. Special emphasis is placed on three areas: works concerning the geographic regions spanning the Canadian Northwest and the American West; innovative and experimental works that challenge the established canons, subjects and formats, with special interest in art and architecture; and internationally focused manuscripts with particular attention to Latin America, World Heritage Sites, international relations and public policy.

== Residence ==
The University of Calgary offers a wide range of residences on campus as a significant proportion of undergraduate and graduate students reside on campus. Approximately 2500 to 3000 students and faculty members live on-campus each Academic year.

- Rundle Hall and Kananaskis Hall – built in the early 1960s when the university relocated to its present campus. Currently houses first year undergraduate students who choose to live on campus.
- Glacier and Olympus Hall - built prior to the 1988 Winter Olympics as the athletes' Olympic Village. These halls currently serve as residences for upper year students. Also built during this time period, Norquay, Brewster & Castle Halls have since been demolished.
- Yamnuska Hall - opened in 2011 for sophomore students. The two and three-bedroom suites are designed to ensure that students experience residence life by sharing space, but also ensures that each student has a private room. Yamnuska Hall also houses one of campus' Starbucks, Domino's Pizza and Subway.
- Aurora Hall – opened in 2015 for upper-year students and replaced the demolished Norquay, Brewster and Castle Halls.
- Crowsnest Hall - opened in 2015 for professional and graduate students.
- Varsity Courts – townhouses designed specifically for family housing.
- Hotel Alma – the university's own hotel that features 96 rooms and amenities for guests.

The University of Calgary names its Residence buildings after prominent mountain ranges in the area.

== Student life ==
=== The Den and Black Lounge ===
The Den and Black Lounge is the campus bar located in MacEwan Hall, the student centre located in the middle of main campus. Occupying two floors, with the Den located on the lower floor and the Black Lounge on the upper floor, in the warmer months of the year the second floor features a large outdoor patio. Once run by the University of Calgary, the Den was taken over by the Students' Union in 2000.

=== The Last Defence Lounge ===
The Last Defence Lounge (LDL) is a fully licensed restaurant operated by the Graduate Students' Association of the University of Calgary. It is open to undergraduate and graduate students, as well as faculty, staff and members of the public.

=== Campus traditions ===
- Bermuda Shorts Day (BSD) was an annual end-of-term tradition for the University of Calgary, usually celebrated around the close of the winter semester every April. As the name suggests, students traditionally wore Bermuda shorts. Recent trends however have seen the rise of bright-neon and floral attire instead of the short formal trouser. The event was notorious for turning the campus, for one day only, into a giant festival of alcohol consumption and day-party concerts. Bermuda Shorts Day has not been hosted since 2019, with the Student's Union citing the then-ongoing COVID-19 pandemic and financial constraints, and the University of Calgary believing that celebrations, including the consumption of alcohol, contributed to an unprofessional environment.
- UCalgaryStrong Festival is an annual end-of-term celebration at the University of Calgary, which has acted as an alternative to Bermuda Shorts Day following its discontinuation in 2019. It is described as "a safe and alcohol-free way for the entire community to enjoy the semester coming to an end," and often includes live music, games, and food selections.

=== Greek life ===
The Chi Gamma chapter of the Zeta Psi fraternity was chartered at the University of Calgary on December 9, 1967, and is the oldest Greek organization on campus. As such, the chapter has been contributing to campus life for over five decades. Zeta Psi – Chi Gamma has several hundred alumni that continue to support both the active chapter as well as the University of Calgary. For over 40 years the Zete Haus has provided economical student housing and has been a focal point for Greek life, being the closest chapter house to campus at approximately 500 meters from MacEwan Hall. The Chi Gamma chapter reactivated in 2014 with 20 members, after having been deactivated in 2008 due to a lack of competitiveness on campus. The active and alumni chapters of Chi Gamma collectively celebrated their fiftieth anniversary on December 9, 2017.

The Mu Lambda chapter of the Kappa Sigma fraternity was founded in 1981. The Mu Lambda chapter house is located on 24 Avenue NW, approximately one and a half kilometres from the University of Calgary.

The Phi Gamma Delta fraternity, also known as Fiji, is one of the three other fraternities present at the university. Founded in 1982, Phi Gamma Delta is the most recent Greek Fraternity to establish a chapter at the University of Calgary. The Fiji chapter house is located on 24 Avenue NW, approximately one kilometre from campus.

Alpha Gamma Delta and Alpha Omicron Pi are the two existing sororities at the U of C, having been established in 1983 and 1985 respectively. Together, they form the Panhellenic Association of Calgary and are part of the global Panhellenic community.

The Omega Chi Chapter was formally initiated into the Alpha Kappa Psi Professional Business Fraternity on March 12, 2005, becoming the 302nd active branch and the 14th in the Northwest Region.

=== Leadership on campus ===
In 2009, the University of Calgary's Office of the Student Experience (now the Student Success Centre) launched their own co-curricular record, the first of its kind in western Canadian universities. The co-curricular record is an official university document that can be coupled with a student's academic transcript, that recognizes out-of-classroom experiences that are still connected to the university. The Student Success Centre (SSC). The SSC offers programs and services to support students in creating: (1) Academic Success, (2) Personal Success, and (3) Career Success. The SSC offers Orientation Programs, Personalized Career Planning Sessions, Career and Life Workshops, Leadership Programs, the First-Year Experience Program, the Senior-Year Experience Program, Arts & Science Program Advising, Learning Support Services, and Writing Support Services.

In April 2011, the University of Calgary launched the Scholars Academy Program: a program for students that excel beyond just mere academics.

The University of Calgary also offers the President's Award for Excellence in Student Leadership to five graduating students (undergraduate or graduate) that represent academic achievement in addition to extracurricular contributions to the university and community.

== Scholarships and awards ==
The University of Calgary offers many scholarships, awards, and bursaries to students.

A notable high school level scholarship is the Alexander Rutherford Scholarship which was introduced by the Government of Alberta in 1980. The Alexander Rutherford scholarship is to recognize and reward exceptional academic achievement at the senior high school level and to encourage students to continue their studies. To be considered for these scholarships, students must be a Canadian citizen or permanent resident who plan to enrol or are enrolled in a full-time post-secondary program of at least one semester in length.

The university joined Project Hero, a scholarship program cofounded by General (Ret'd) Rick Hillier, for the families of fallen Canadian Forces members. Dependents of Canadian Forces personnel killed while serving in active military missions will have the support of the University of Calgary to complete undergraduate degrees.

The office of the chancellor and senate offers many scholarships, awards, and bursaries to University of Calgary students who demonstrate outstanding academic achievement and exceptional service to the internal and external community.

In 2011, the University of Calgary joined the Schulich Leader Scholarship program. Through this initiative, each year the university awards one $80,000.00 scholarship to a student entering the Schulich School of Engineering and one $60,000.00 scholarship to a student entering a Science, Technology or Mathematics program at the University of Calgary.

Top students in the Schulich School of Engineering are recognized as Schulich Scholars and are awarded prestigious Schulich Entrance Scholarships. The first cohort of Schulich Scholars graduated in 2010–2011.

Students enrolled in the Bachelor of Health Sciences Program are eligible for the O'Brien Centre Continuing Scholarship, which supports full-time students dedicated to extra-curricular involvement and the community on top of their academics.

Graduate students are also eligible for the prestigious Queen Elizabeth II Graduate Scholarships. Awards are available in thirds, two-thirds, or full increments, and are valued at $10,800 at the Master's level and $15,000 at the PhD level. These are provincially funded awards and are available to graduate students at some other Albertan post-secondary institutions.

The university also offers student awards for academic and leadership excellence. The two biggest awards a student can receive are the President's Award for Excellence in Student Leadership and the Arch Future Alumni Award.

=== Order of the University of Calgary ===
The Order of the University of Calgary, developed in 1994 resulting from a suggestion brought forward from the university's senate, honours worthy recipients who have a record of exemplary and distinguished service to the university. Individuals who have been admitted into the order have included faculty, staff, students, alumni and volunteers. Young Aboriginal leaders such as Spencer Saurette have caused an increased awareness in Aboriginal heritage and traditions on campus. It is available to any member of the university community, those currently or formerly attached to the university and to those representing the university in the community. Candidates nominated for membership in the order may include, but are not limited to, current or former faculty, staff, students (graduate or undergraduate), alumni and volunteers.

The Order of the University of Calgary includes numerous personalities of note including the likes of Dr. Eldon R. Smith. As of November 2009, a total of 114 individuals had been admitted into the order.

== Aboriginal ==
The University of Calgary recognizes Aboriginal students, and has instituted an Aboriginal Admissions Policy [section A.13] and Aboriginal Student Access Program (ASAP) [section A.14], as dictated in the Undergraduate Admissions section of the annual calendar. Any student with Aboriginal ancestry (First Nations, Inuit, Metis) and legal status may apply and be considered under the policy. More information can be obtained online at the University of Calgary's website.

== Notable people ==
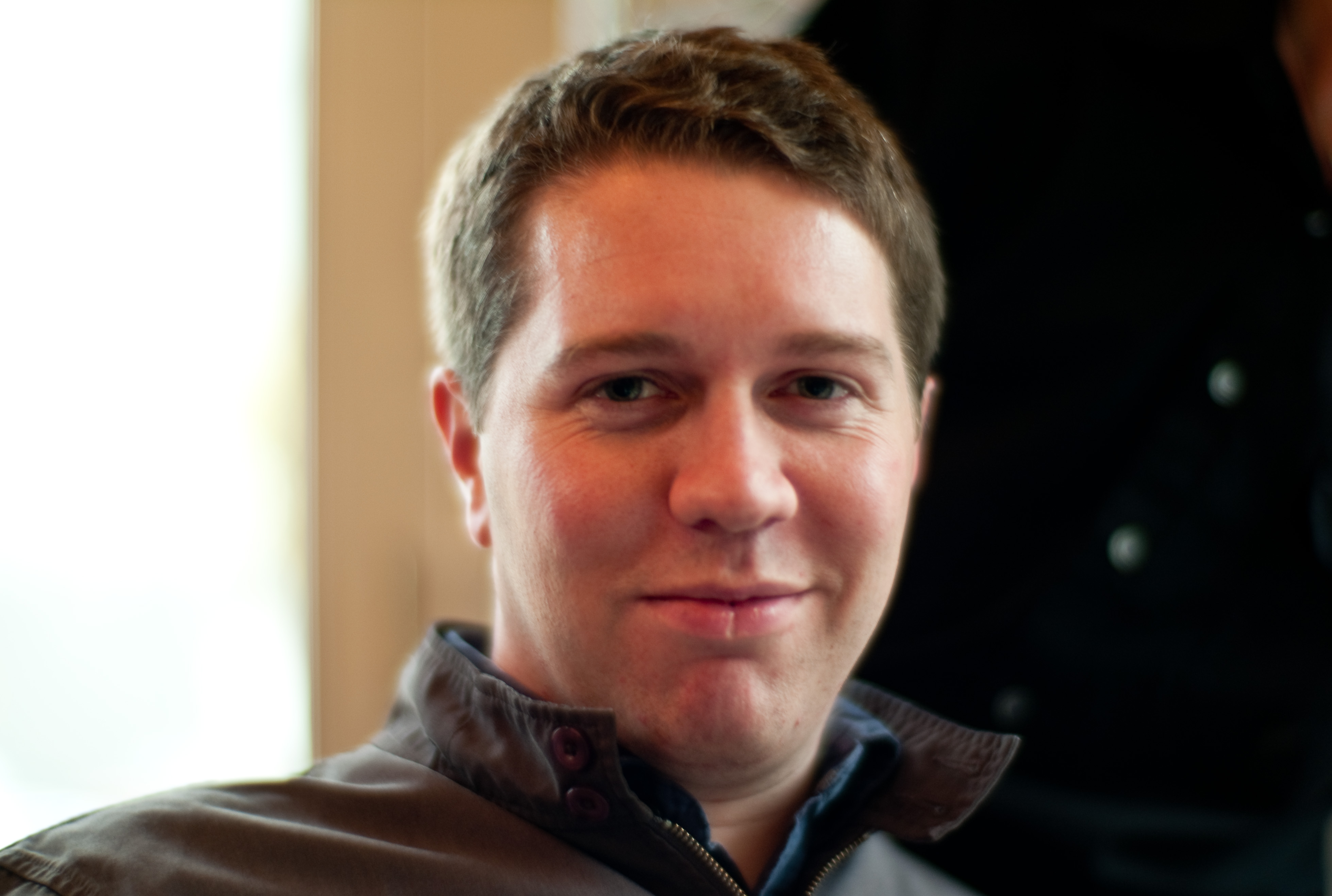
Garrett Camp, co-founder of StumbleUpon and Uber

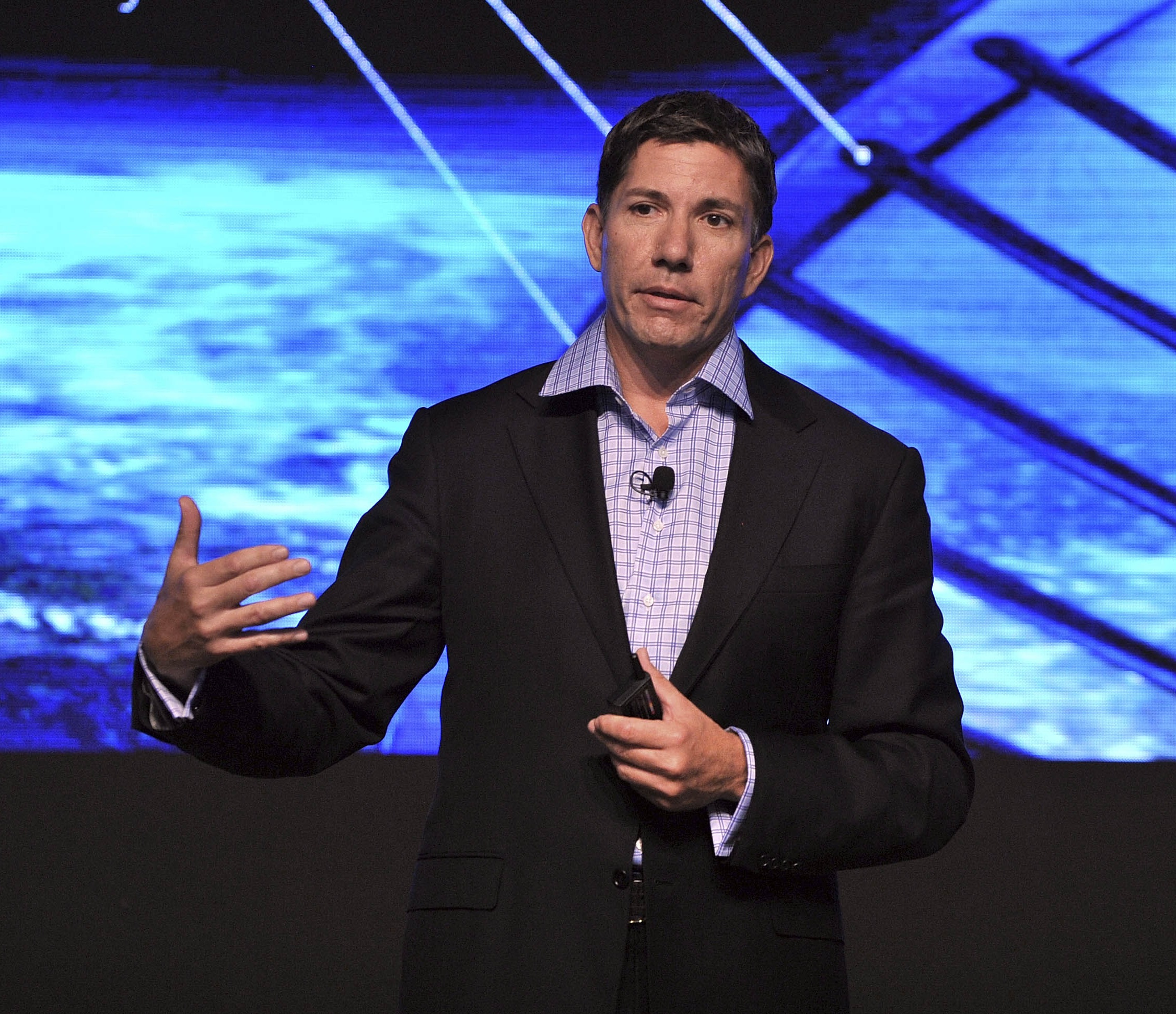
Gary Kovacs, former CEO of Mozilla and AVG Technologies

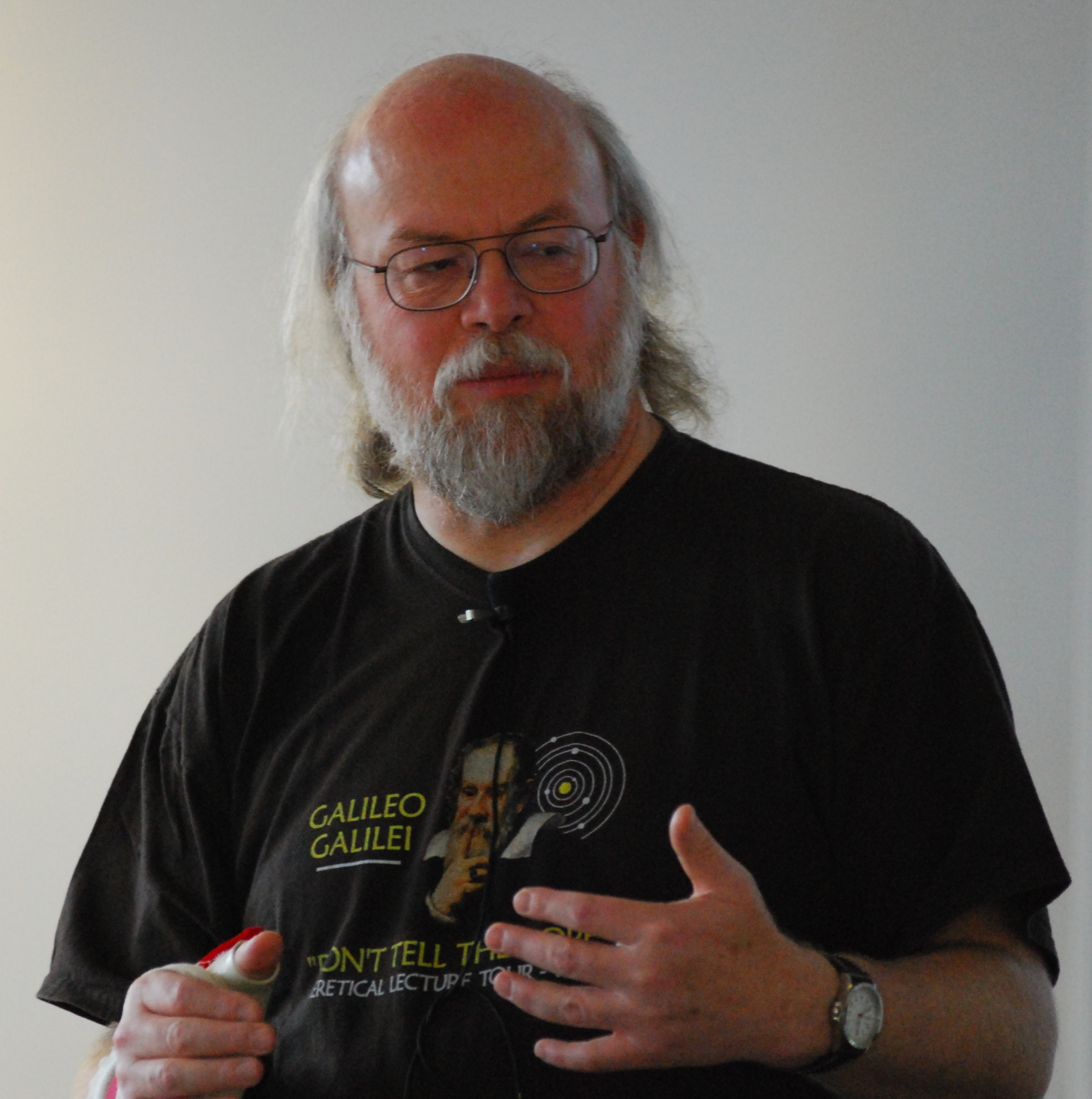
James Gosling, computer scientist and creator of the Java programming language

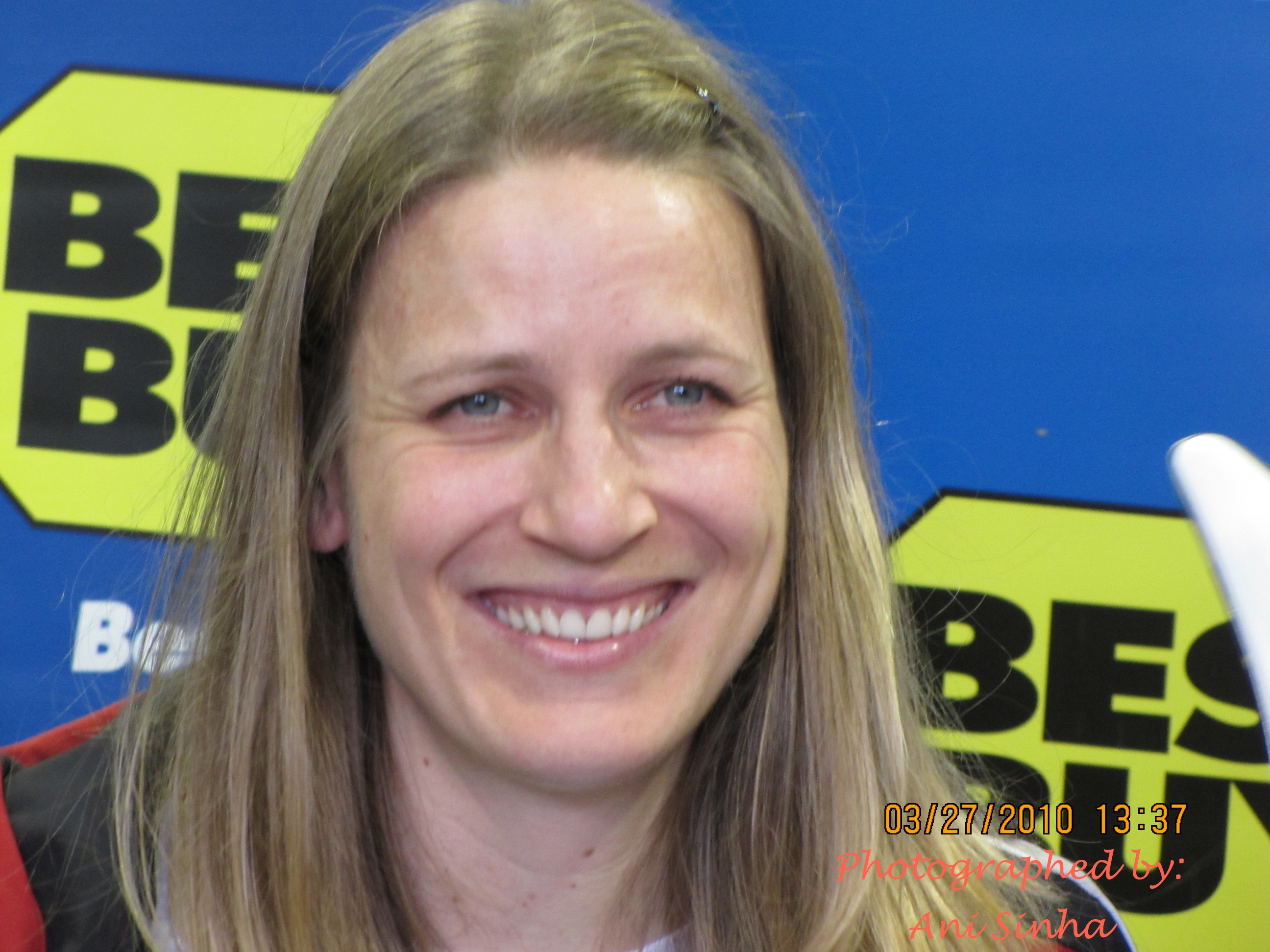
Kristina Groves, former Olympian in speed skating

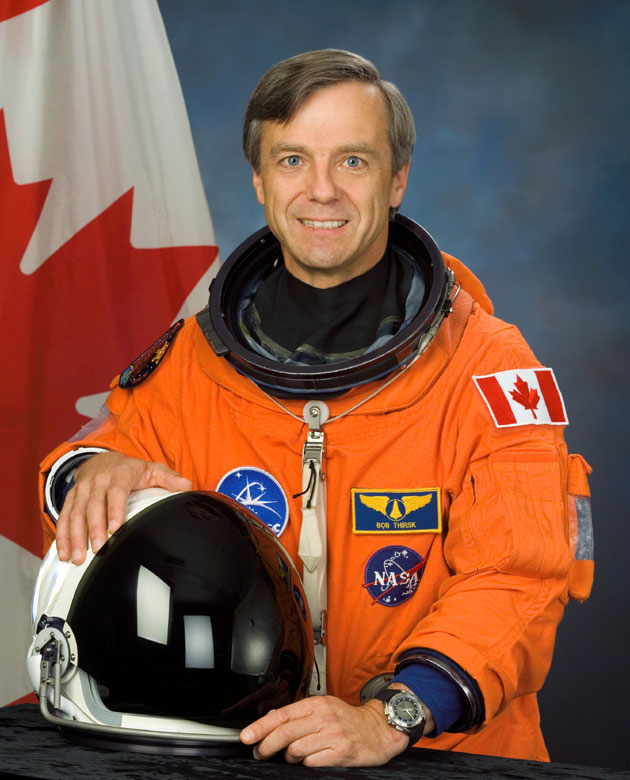
Robert Thirsk, Canadian astronaut and chancellor of the University of Calgary, 2014–2018

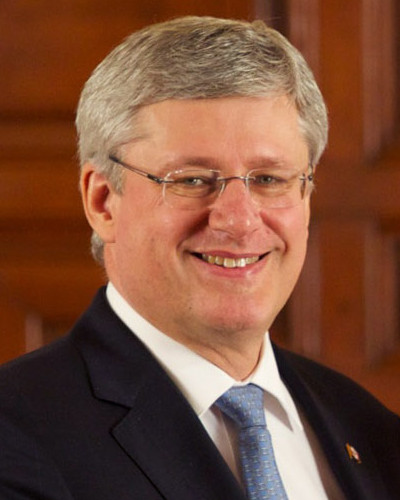
Stephen Harper, 22nd Prime Minister of Canada

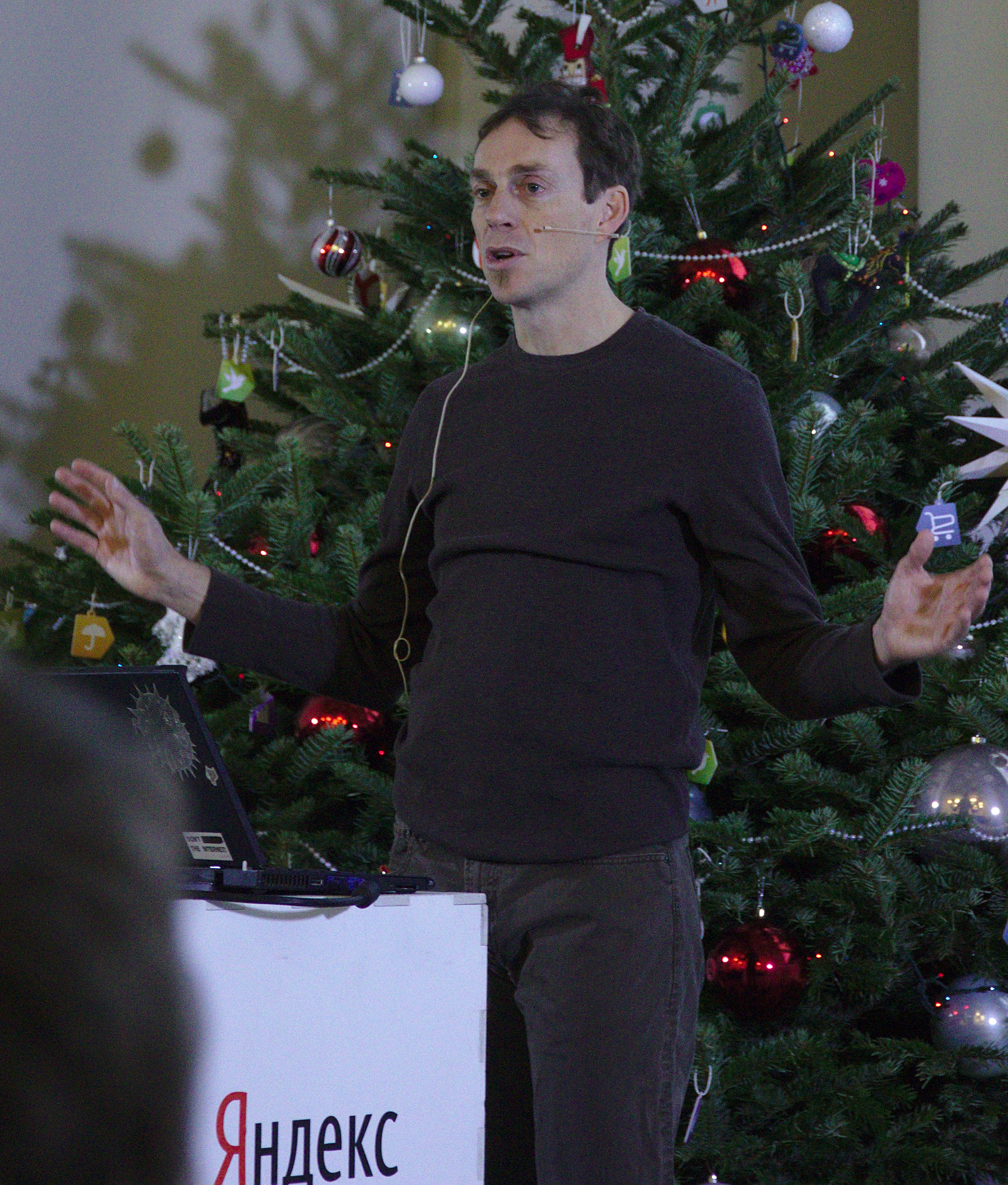
Theo de Raadt, software engineer and founder of the OpenBSD and OpenSSH projects

A number of individuals are associated with the University of Calgary, either as former alumni, or faculty. The university has also produced 14 Rhodes scholars. Notable alumni of the university include:

- James Gosling, OC, (BSc 1977), Honorary LL.D., Inventor of the Java programming language
- Judith A. Snider (LL.B. 1981), Judge at Federal Court of Canada, international mediator and arbitrator
- Chip Wilson (Bachelor of Arts in economics, 1980), founder of Lululemon
- Robert Thirsk (BSc 1976), Canadian Space Agency astronaut and NASA capsule communicator for the International Space Station program
- Linda Taylor (lawyer) B.A., LL.B., director of United Nations Office of Administration of Justice (OAJ)
- Stephen Harper (BA, MA, 1991), former Prime Minister of Canada and former leader of the Conservative Party
- Michael Lapidge, B.A., Medieval Latin Scholar, Fellow of the British Academy
- Imants Barušs, MSc, author, Member of New York Academy of Sciences
- Hal Kvisle (1981), MBA, member of the Trilateral Commission
- Klaus-Jurgen Bathe (MSc), pioneer of finite element analysis, professor at Massachusetts Institute of Technology
- Warren Kinsella LL.B., Toronto-based lawyer and political consultant, key strategist for the Liberal Party of Canada
- Garrett Camp (B.S. Engineering), co-founded StumbleUpon and Uber
- Harvey Locke B.A., LL.B., internationally recognized conservationist lawyer
- Sharon Carstairs, member of the Senate of Canada
- Theo de Raadt (BSc 1992), founder and leader of the OpenBSD and OpenSSH projects, worked with UC Berkeley and DARPA
- Alan R. Hildebrand, associate professor of geoscience, discovered significance of Chicxulub Crater
- Gary Kovacs (BComm 1990, MBA 1999), CEO of the Mozilla Corporation
- Naheed Nenshi (BComm 1993), former mayor of Calgary, also educated at Harvard University
- Kenneth B. Storey (BSc 1971), biologist and chemist noted for work on biochemical adaptation; fellow of the Royal Society of Canada
- W. Brett Wilson (MBA 1985), chairman of FirstEnergy Capital Corp; Dragons' Den panellist
- D. George Wyse (MD 1974), cardiologist, professor emeritus of the university's Faculty of Medicine, Libin Cardiovascular Institute of Alberta, researcher on cardiac dysrhythmia, fellow of the Royal College of Physicians and Surgeons of Canada
- Ezra Levant (BComm 1993), media personality and founder of The Western Standard, co-founder of Rebel News

== Arms ==
Coat of arms of the University of Calgary
Adopted Granted 13 April 1967 Crest The shield consists of two parts, the upper part (the chief) separated from the lower (the base) by an arched line symbolizing the Chinook arch. Escutcheon Or a bull's head caboshed Sable accorné Gules between two flags Gules their staves Sable conjoined in base, on a chief enarched Gules a rose Argent barbed and seeded Vert between two open books Argent bound and edged Or. Motto Mo shuile togam sua (I will lift up mine eyes)

== See also ==
- List of universities and colleges in Alberta
- Calgary Health Trust, a joint fundraising effort raising money for health care facilities
- Calgary School, a group of academics and former students from the university
- Centre for Military and Strategic Studies
- Friends of Science, a climate change denial group partly funded by donations routed through a fund set up by a professor at the university
- UC Solar Team
- University of Calgary Students' Union
