= List of hospitals in Calgary =

The following is a list of hospitals located across/in Calgary.

== List ==
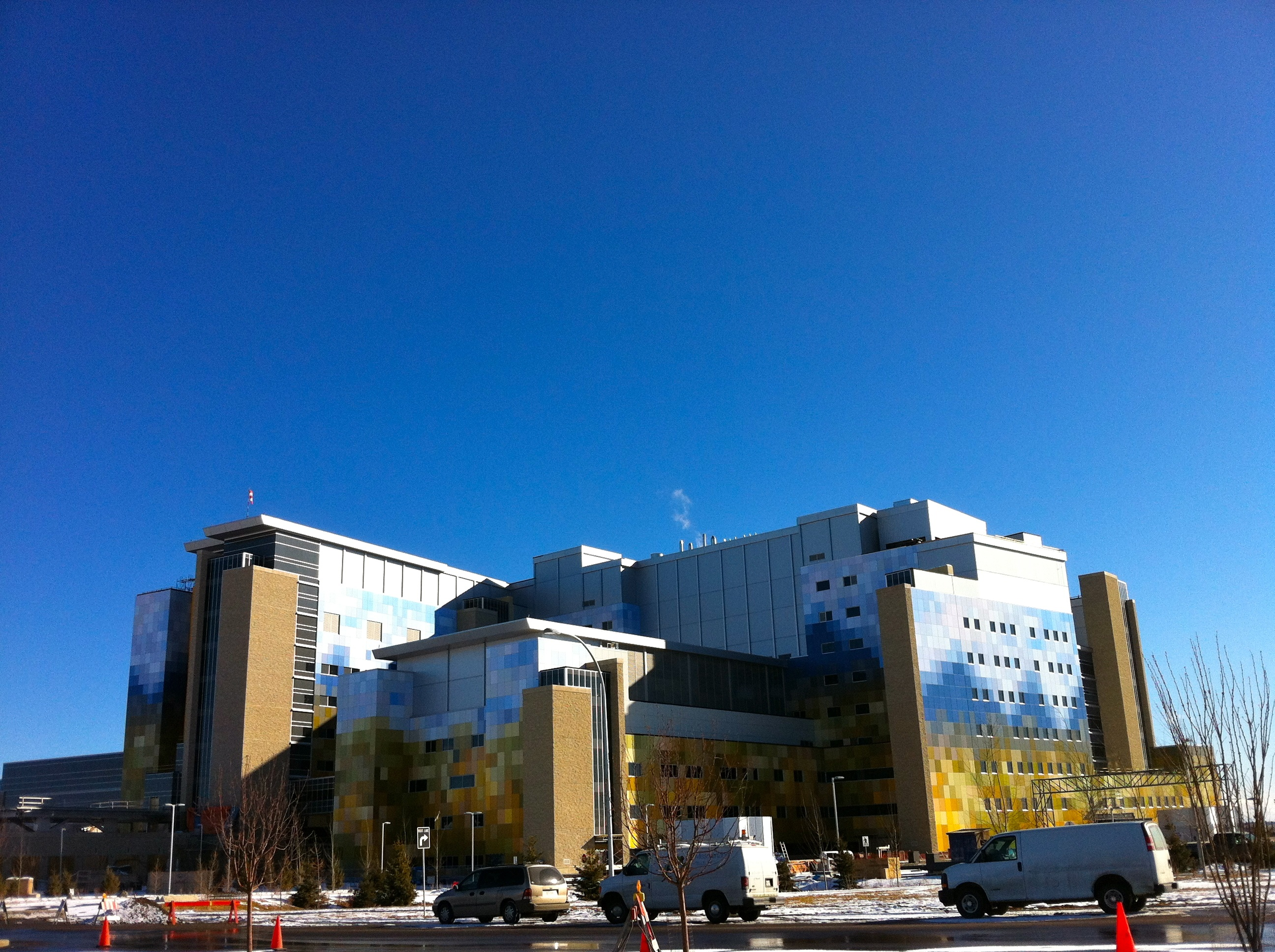
South Health Campus

- Alberta Children's Hospital (ACH)
- Arthur J.E. Child Comprehensive Cancer Centre (ACCC)
- East Calgary Health Centre (ECHC)
- Foothills Medical Centre (FMC)
- Peter Lougheed Centre (PLC)
- Richmond Road Diagnostic & Treatment Centre (RRDTC)
- Rockyview General Hospital (RGH)
- Sheldon M. Chumir Health Centre (SMCHC)
- South Calgary Health Centre (SCHC)
- Southern Alberta Forensic Psychiatric Centre (SAFPC)
- South Health Campus (SHC)

== See also ==
- List of hospitals in Alberta
