= Cumming School of Medicine =

Medical school in Alberta, Canada

- Type: Medical school
- Established: 1967; 59 years ago
- Affiliations: University of Calgary
- Dean: Dr. Jon Meddings, MD, FRCPC
- Location: Calgary, Alberta, Canada; 51°03′57″N 114°08′04″W
- Website: medicine.ucalgary.ca

The Cumming School of Medicine (previously Faculty of Medicine) is the medical school of the University of Calgary. It was established in 1967 and adopted its current name in 2014. It is one of two medical schools in Alberta and one of 17 in Canada. The faculty is located on the Foothills Campus of the University of Calgary in the Health Sciences Centre. This facility is annexed to Foothills Medical Centre.

The medical school is associated with several hospitals in the Alberta Health Services system such as Foothills Medical Centre, Alberta Children's Hospital, Rockyview General Hospital and Chinook Regional Hospital. Trainees in faculty of medicine include 486 medical students (UME), 767 residents (PGME), 190 post doctoral fellows (PDF) and 491 graduate students.

It is one of two 3-year medical schools in Canada, along with McMaster University Medical School. In addition, the University of Calgary Cumming School of Medicine offers an undergraduate Bachelor of Health Sciences degree and a Bachelor of Community Rehabilitation and Disability Studies degree.

== Program offerings ==
- Doctor of Medicine (MD)
- Leaders in Medicine (Joint MD/Graduate Degree Program)
- Bachelor of Health Sciences (BHSc)
- Bachelor of Community Rehabilitation and Disability Studies (BCR)
- Neurological Sciences and Mental Health
- Cardiovascular and Respiratory Sciences
- Pathology
- Immunology
- Community Health Sciences
- Gastrointestinal Sciences
- Medical Sciences Graduate Division of Education
- Microbiology and Infectious Diseases

=== Doctor of Medicine program ===
The Doctor of Medicine program was founded in 1970. It is one of two fully accredited medical schools in Canada that offers a three-year Doctor of Medicine program. The program is structured so that the pre-clerkship curriculum is taught year-round, without an extended summer break (as is common in 4-year MD programs). This structure allows the pre-clerkship portion of undergraduate medical education to be shortened in length, without limiting the breadth of medical knowledge required for students to be competent before entering the clerkship phase of the curriculum.

== Departments ==
- Anaesthesia
- Biochemistry and Molecular Biology
- Laboratory Medicine
- Cardiac Sciences
- Cell Biology and Anatomy
- Clinical Neurosciences
- Community Health Sciences
- Critical Care Medicine
- Family Medicine
- Medicine
- Medical Genetics
- Microbiology, Immunology and Infectious Diseases
- Obstetrics and Gynaecology
- Oncology
- Paediatrics
- Pathology and Laboratory Medicine
- Physiology and Pharmacology
- Psychiatry
- Radiology
- Surgery

== Institutes ==
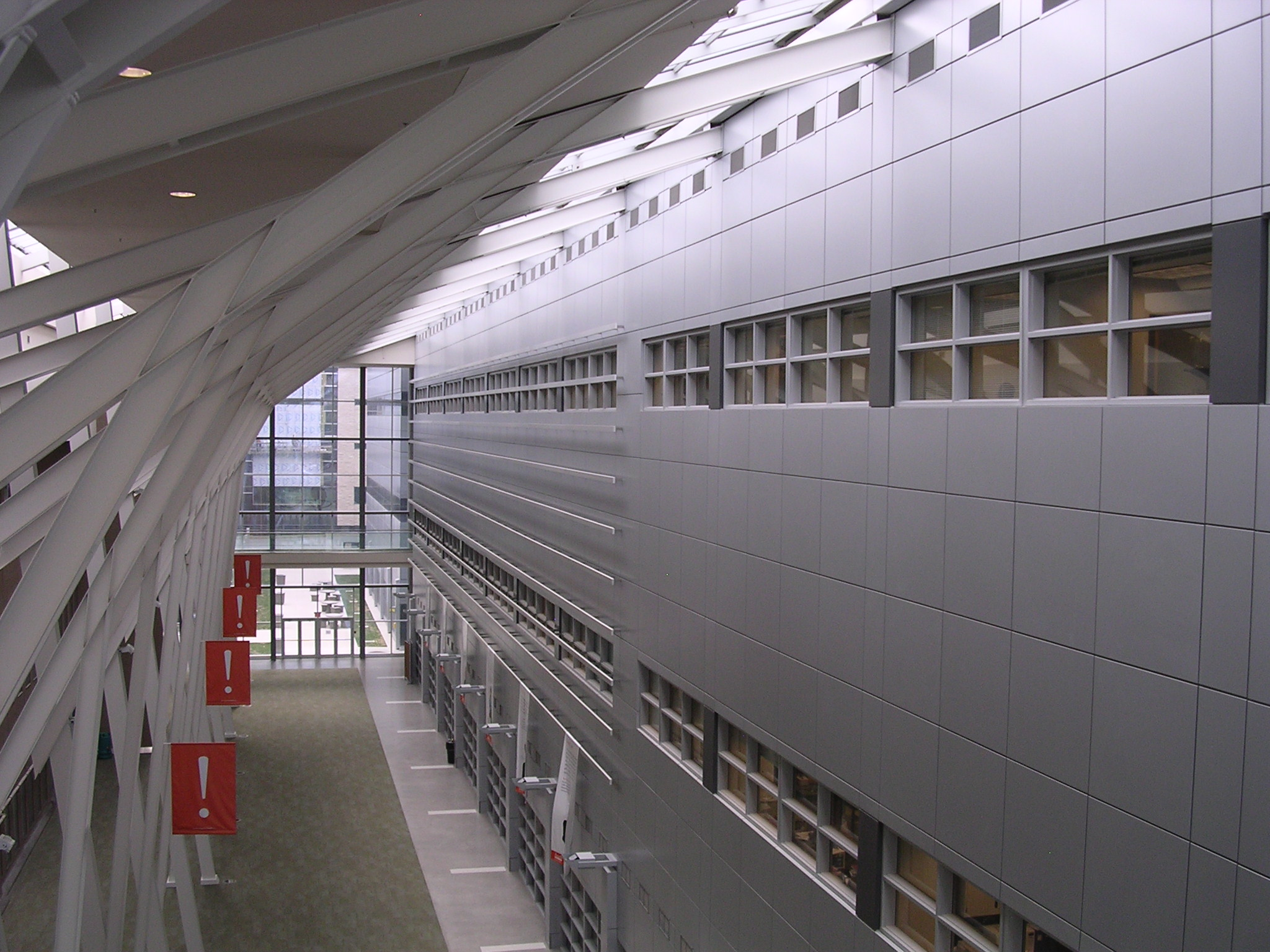
Health Innovation Research Centre

Thematic institutes were formed between Faculty of Medicine and the Calgary Health Region that support and fulfill the vision and mission of these two entities. Philosophically, institutes encompass activities in all three areas of education, research and care delivery.

Currently there are seven Institutes identified as follows:

- McCaig Institute for Bone and Joint Health
- Hotchkiss Brain Institute
- Calvin, Phoebe and Joan Snyder Institute of Infection, Immunity & Inflammation
- Alberta Children's Hospital Research Institute for Child and Maternal Health (ACHRI)
- Libin Cardiovascular Institute of Alberta
- Arnie Charbonneau Cancer Institute
- O'Brien Institute for Public Health

== Menagerie ==
The medical school has a history of having the second-year medical students give an animal name to the first-year students, effectively welcoming them into the UofC Menagerie. A complete list of classes includes:

- 1973: Guinea Pigs
- 1975: Turkeys
- 1976: Beavers
- 1977: Toads
- 1978: Minks
- 1979:Lemmings
- 1980:Chameleons
- 1981: Lampreys
- 1982:Locusts
- 1983:Sloths
- 1984: Emus
- 1985: Wombats
- 1986:Pigs
- 1987: Slugs
- 1988: Poodles
- 1989: Flamingos
- 1990: Pandas
- 1991:Yaks
- 1992: Dikdiks
- 1993:Auks
- 1994:Peccaries
- 1995:Quokkas
- 1996: Sifakas
- 1997:Bandicoots
- 1998:Skinks
- 1999:Dugongs
- 2000: Bonobo|Bonobos]
- 2001: Bonobos
- 2002: Pangolins
- 2003: Geoducks
- 2004: Taphozous
- 2005: Candirus
- 2006:Fulmars
- 2007:Meerkats
- 2008:Tuataras
- 2009: Macaques
- 2010: Glabers
- 2011: Kākāpōs
- 2012: Blobfish
- 2013: Aye-ayes
- 2014: Hellbenders
- 2015: Cows
- 2016: Narwhals
- 2017: Humuhumunukunukuapua'a (briefly Roosters)
- 2018: Goats
- 2019: Dholes
- 2020: Boops boops
- 2021: Limpkins
- 2022: Tanukis
- 2023: Echidnas
- 2024: Bilbies
- 2025: Spiny Lumpsuckers
- 2026: Lunkarya
- 2027: Potoos
- 2028: Wobbegongs
- 2029: Mudskippers
