= Calgary General Hospital =

Series of medical facilities in Calgary, Canada

Coordinates: 51°03′17″N 114°02′46″W

Calgary General Hospital was the name given to a series of medical facilities in the city of Calgary.

== Early hospitals ==
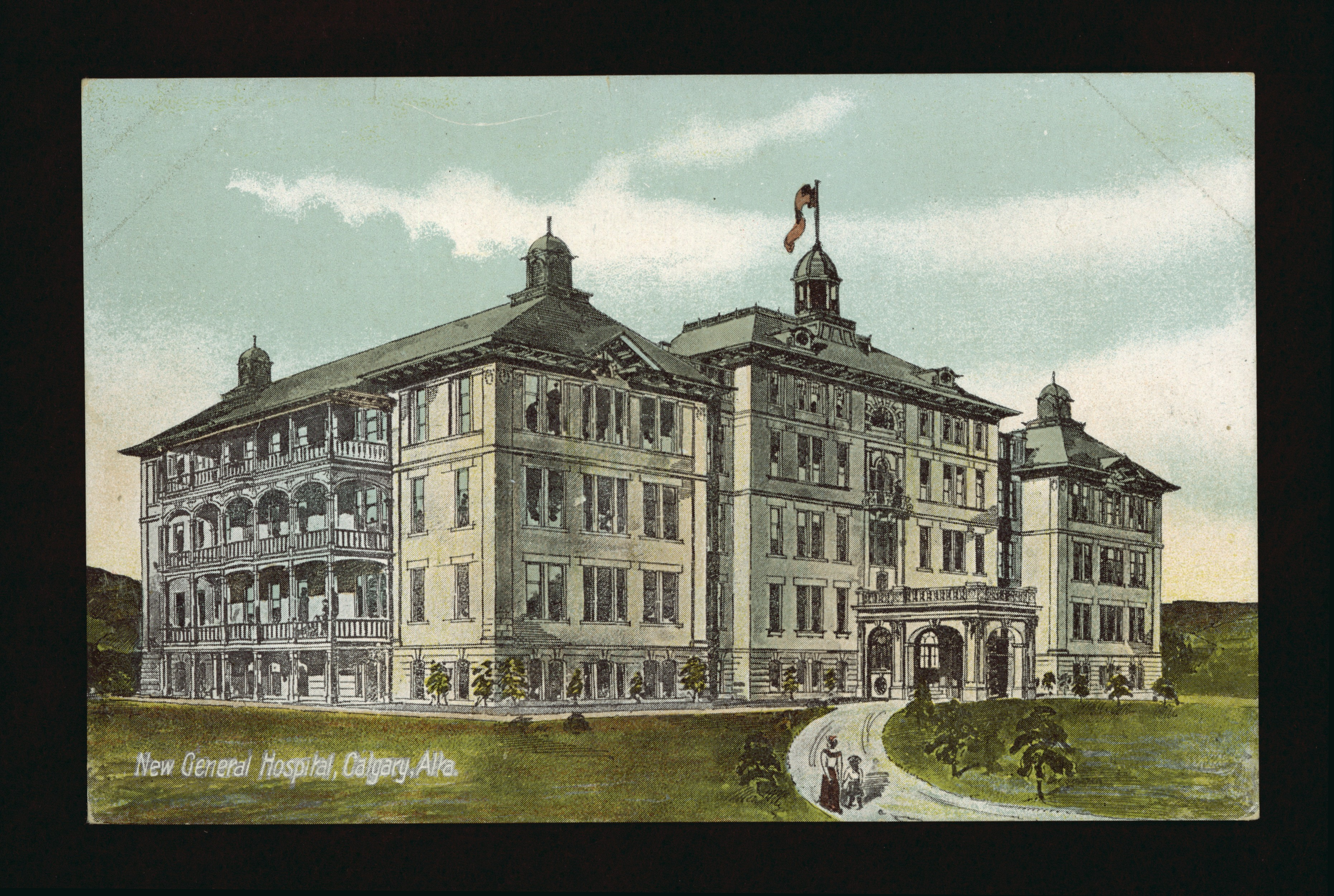
Architect's sketch of General Hospital III

- Calgary General Hospital #1: 7th Street and 9th Avenue S.W. opened in October 1890 in the form of a 2-storey wood-frame house accommodating eight or nine patients. Abandoned in 1895 for a larger structure.
- Calgary General Hospital #2: Built at 6th Street and 12th Avenue S.E. and opened in 1895; a 35-bed hospital constructed of sandstone. Additional wards added in the 20th Century, and converted into an isolation hospital in 1910. Parts of the façade exist today as the Rundle Ruins.
- Calgary General Hospital #3: 4-storey brick and sandstone structure built at 841 Centre Avenue N.E. and opened in 1910 with capacity of 160 beds. Criticized as "too small" from the onset of operations.
- Calgary General Hospital #4: Built on the site of General Hospital Number 3 at 841 Centre Avenue N.E. between 1949 and 1953.

== Acute Care facility ==
Calgary General Hospital #4 became the oldest hospital located in the city of Calgary by the time of its demolition in 1998. The facility was known in its later history as the Bow Valley Centre of the Calgary General Hospital after it was merged with the Peter Lougheed Centre, developing into a 960-bed hospital providing a wide array of in-patient and out-patient services. The facility was located in the community of Bridgeland in northeast Calgary, situated minutes away from Calgary City Centre.

=== Demolition ===
The Calgary General Hospital was demolished on October 4, 1998, and its services were transferred to the nearby Peter Lougheed Centre amidst the Klein government's immense cuts to the province's health care system.

Ex-premier Ralph Klein's former chief of staff Rod Love said the facility was "old, dysfunctional and badly organized" and had to be closed if health care was going to be modernized.

The demolition was controversial in the wake of continued health care demands in Calgary. Proponents of the demolition argued that the facility was aged and unable to provide efficient service for the money required to operate it, "but the decision left Calgary without an emergency department downtown and destroyed a "state of the art" facility that would (10 years later) be very much in demand".

Amid all the closures and rationalizations, the Calgary General is unique in two respects. It is the biggest North American hospital ever to shut down and have its functions, equipment, staff and patients integrated into existing hospitals, and its closure left Calgary as the only large city in Canada without a downtown emergency department.

The hospital comprised numerous buildings constructed over an extended period of time beginning in 1910. In total, seven buildings over three storeys in height and 84,000 m^{2} in area were imploded using ~2300 kg of explosives.

== See also ==
- Health Care in Calgary
- Calgary Health Region
- Health care in Canada
- List of hospitals in Canada
- Libin Cardiovascular Institute of Alberta
