= Tom Baker Cancer Centre =

Tom Baker Cancer Centre at the Foothills Medical Centre
- Alberta Health Services
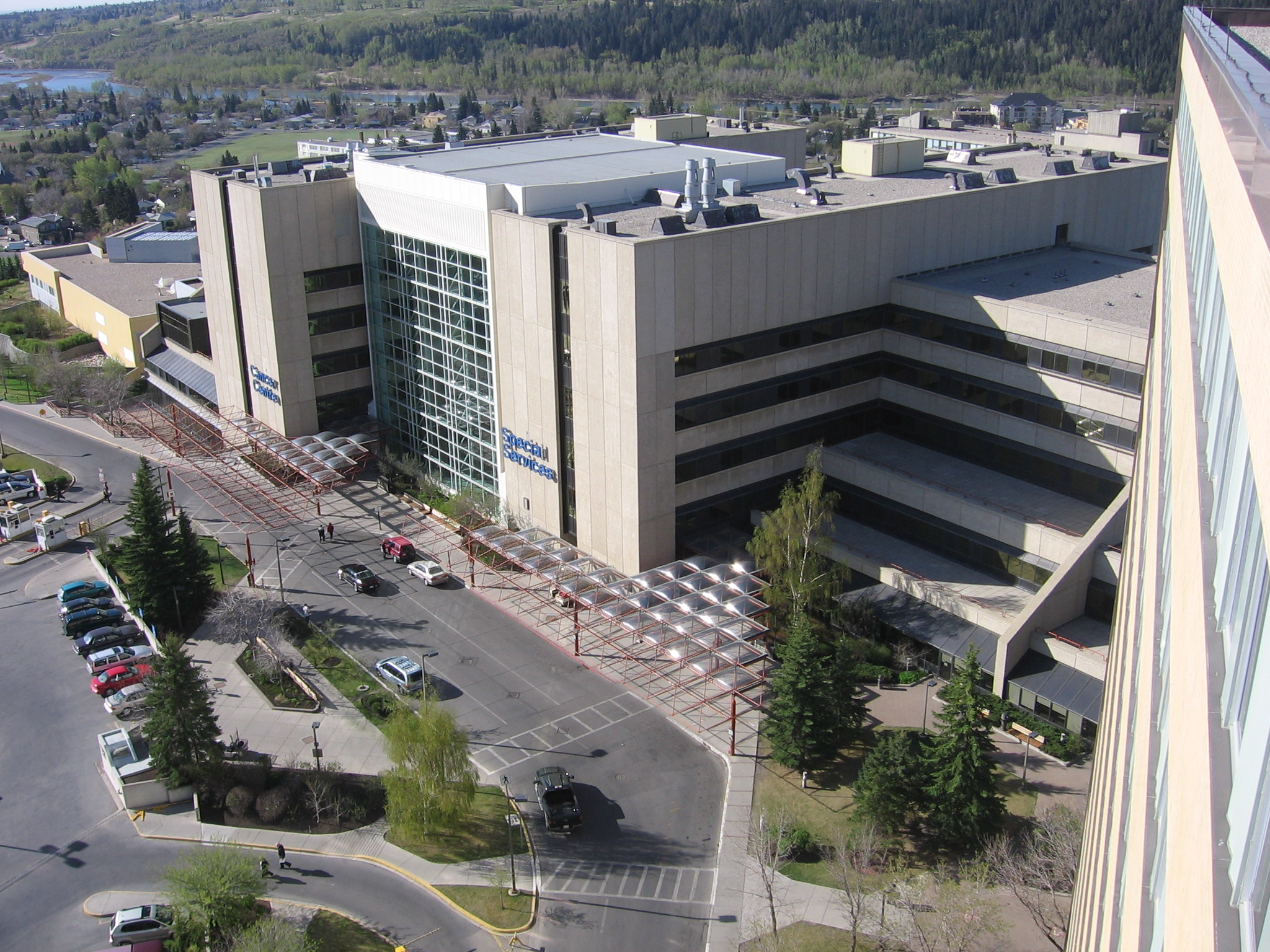
- Location of The Tom Baker Cancer Centre in Calgary

Geography
- Location: 1403 - 29 St. N.W., Calgary, Alberta, Canada
- Coordinates: 51.06297°N 114.1336°W

Organization
- Care system: Public Medicare (Canada)
- Type: Teaching
- Affiliated university: University of Calgary

Services
- Beds: Unknown
- Speciality: Medical oncology

History
- Founded: 1981
- Closed: 2024

Links
- Lists: Hospitals in Canada

Tom Baker Cancer Centre (TBCC) was a tertiary care facility for Southern Alberta, named for the founding chairman of the Alberta Cancer Board. It was a lead Cancer Centre in southern Alberta for prevention, research and treatment programs and provides many advanced medical services, as well as supportive care for both inpatients and outpatients. The Cancer Centre also conducted research through the Charbonneau Cancer Institute and housed a comprehensive palliative care facility.

The Cancer Centre was located at the Foothills Medical Centre and has since become a part of the Special Services Building, which too provides special, advanced medical services to patients.

In 2024 the facility was closed and replaced by the Arthur J.E. Child Comprehensive Cancer Centre which is 300 meters to the north. The Tom Baker Centre building is being repurposed to provide more clinical lab, clinic and office space for Foothills Medical Centre.

== See also ==
- Cross Cancer Institute
- Alberta Health Services
- List of hospitals in Canada
