= TBCC =

TBCC may refer to:

- Tribasic copper chloride, a copper compound widely used as a feed supplement
- Thomas Bennett Community College, a comprehensive school in Crawley, West Sussex, England
- Tillamook Bay Community College, a community college in Tillamook Bay, Oregon
- Turbine-based combined cycle engine, a specific kind of combined cycle engine
- Tom Baker Cancer Centre, Calgary, Alberta, Canada
- The Big Comfy Couch, a live-action children's TV series that aired on PBS Kids, beginning in 1992
