= Health care in Calgary =

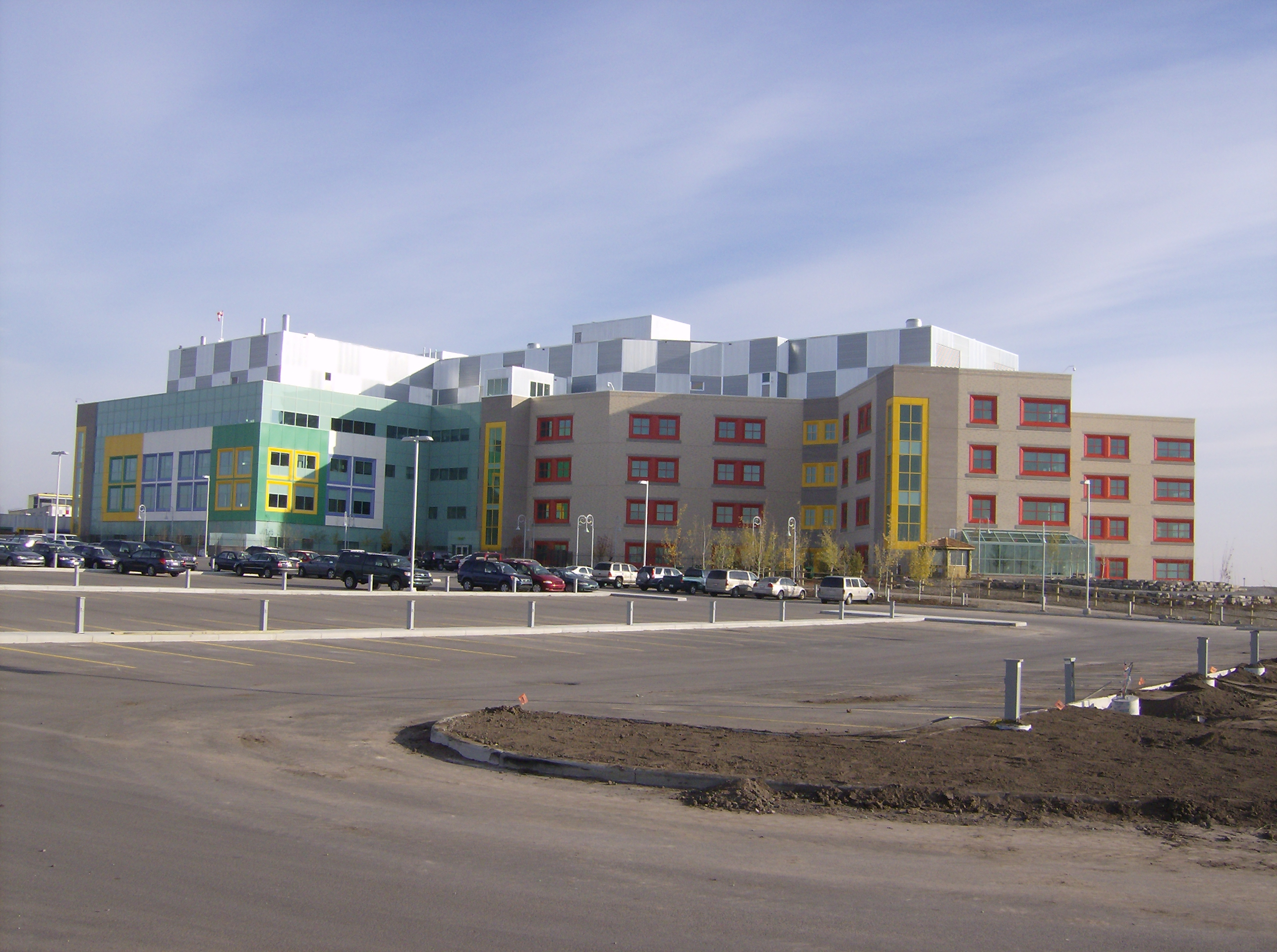
Alberta Children's Hospital

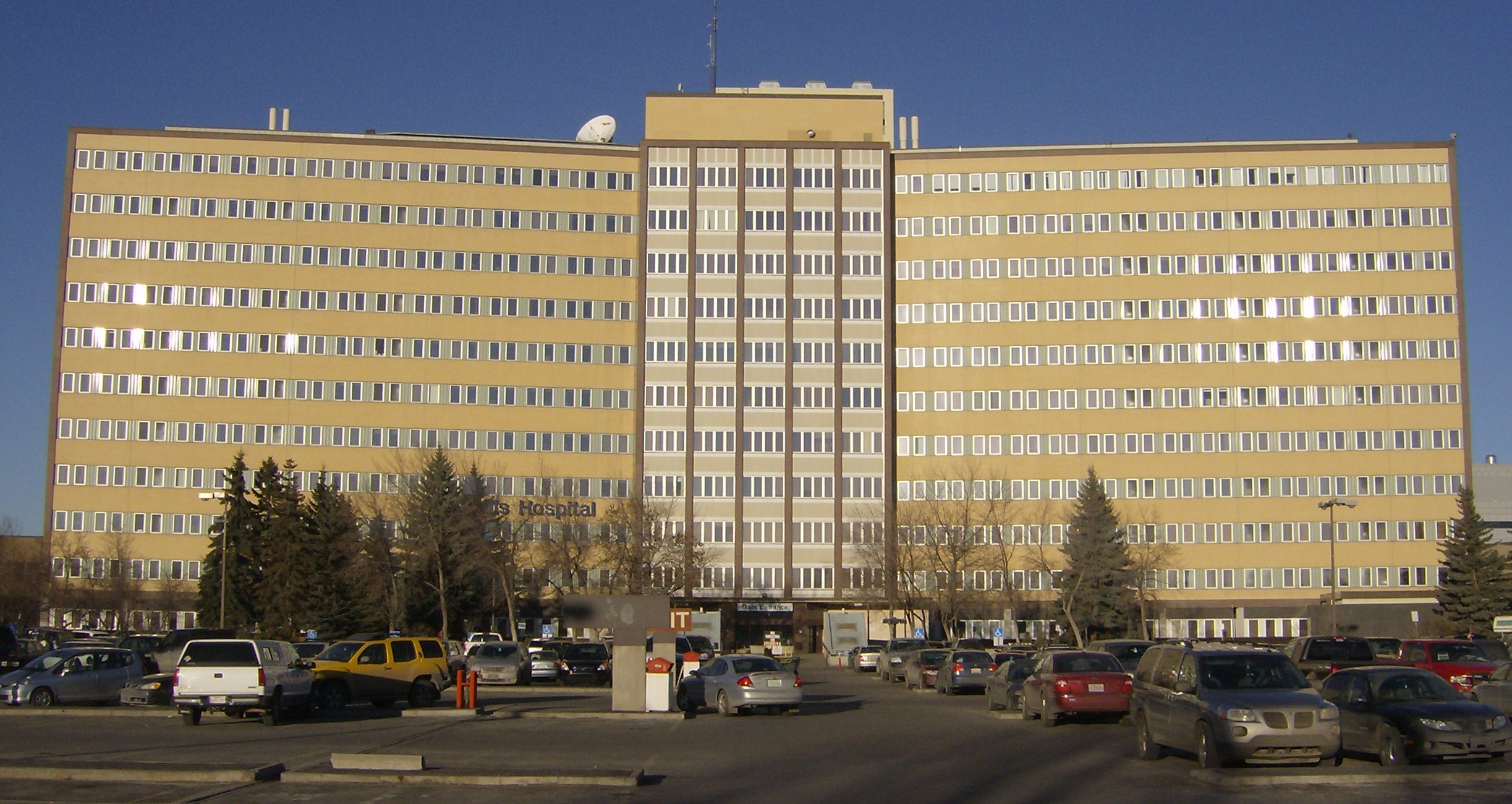
Foothills Medical Centre

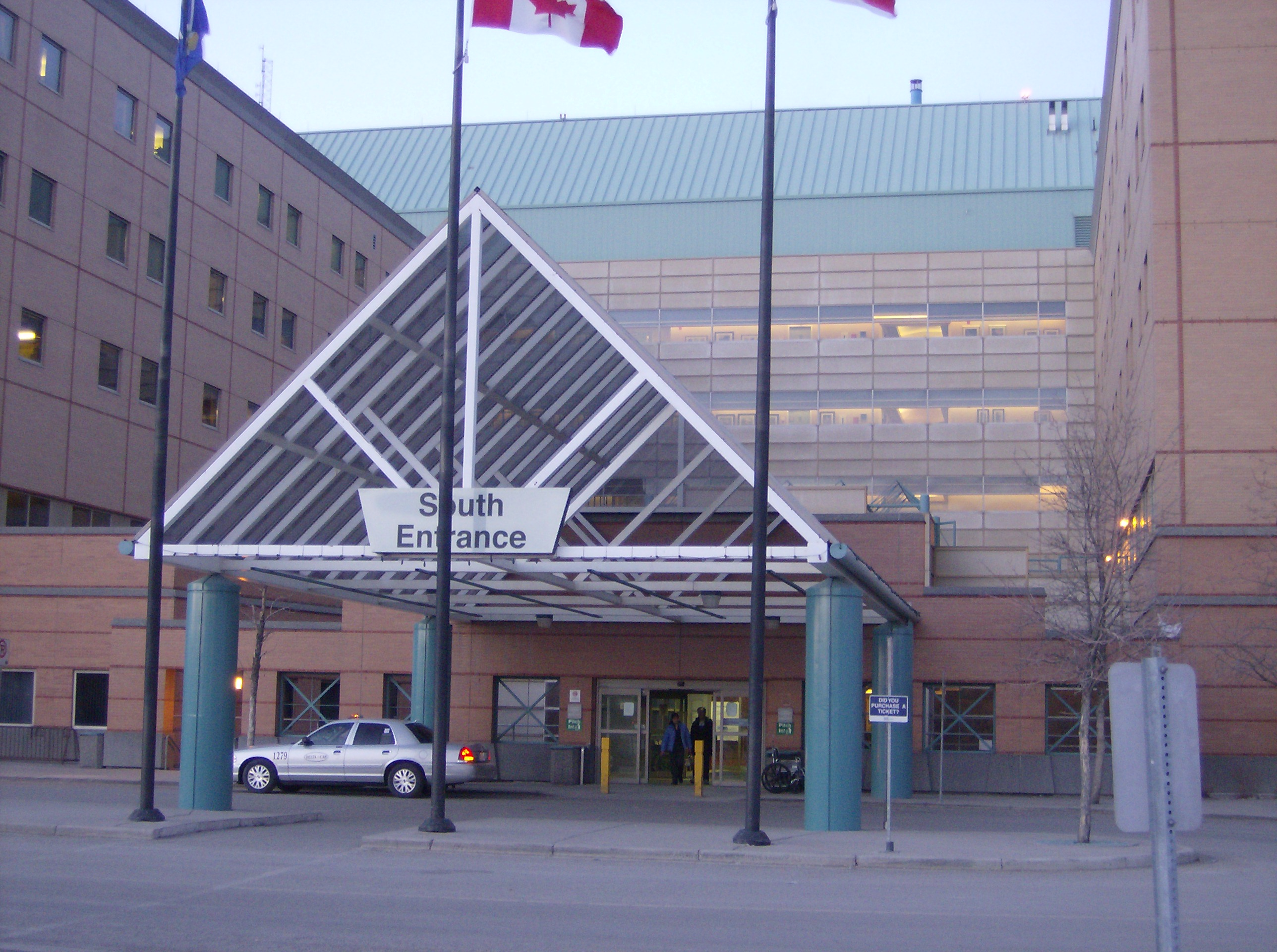
Peter Lougheed Centre

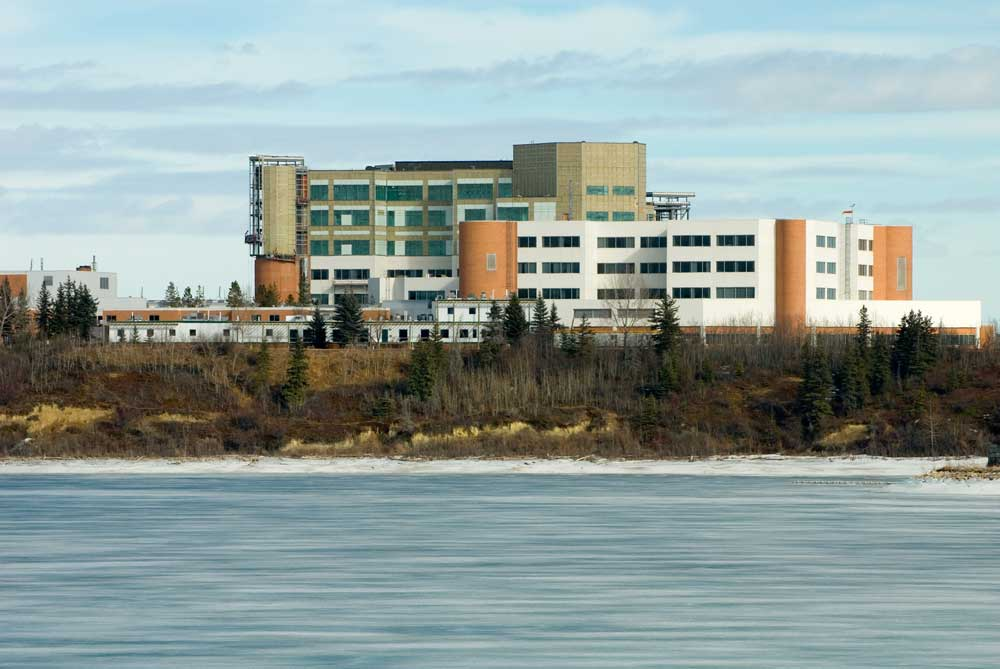
Rockyview General Hospital

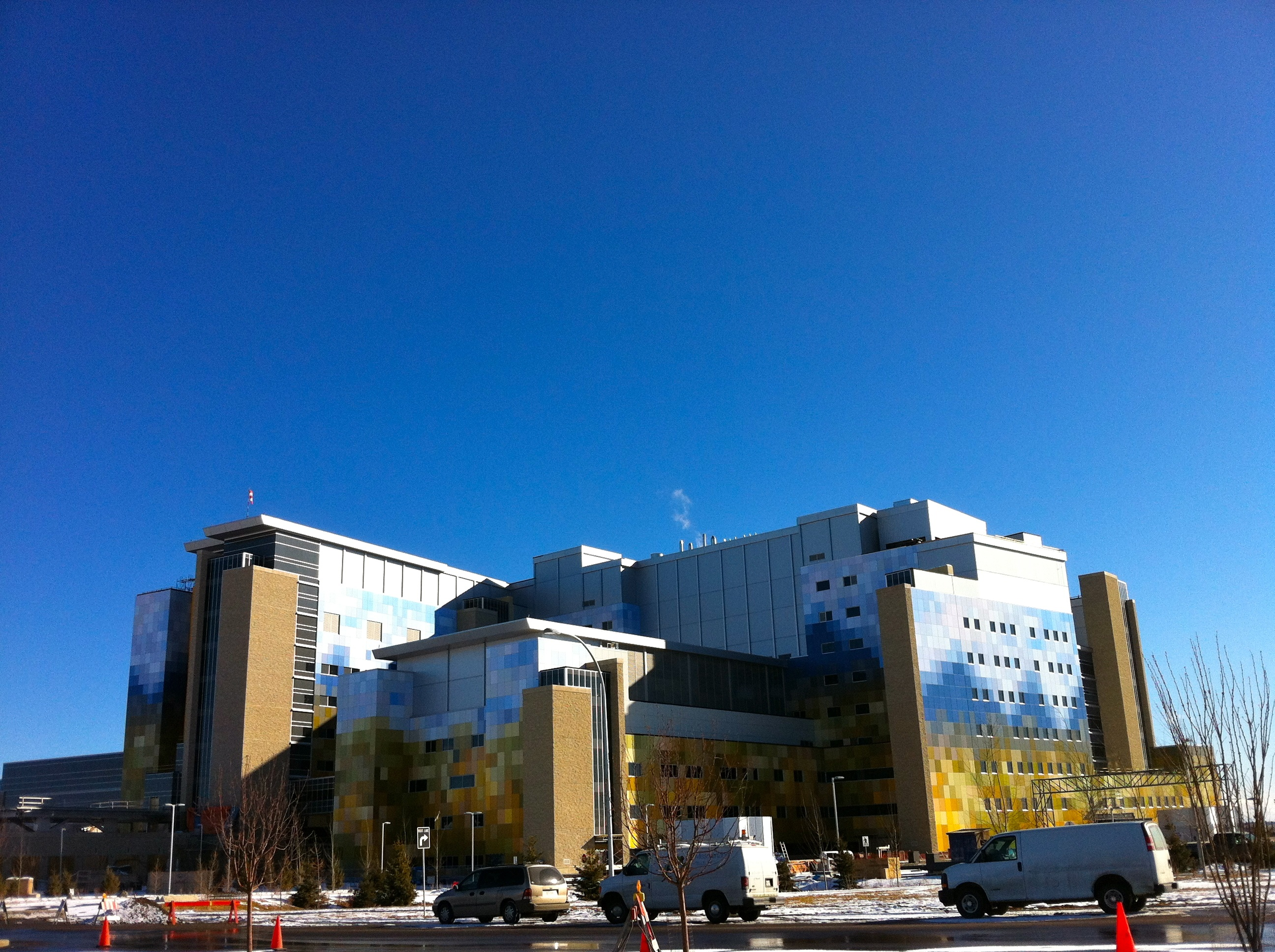
South Health Campus

Calgary currently has four major adult acute care hospitals; the Foothills Medical Centre, the Peter Lougheed Centre, the Rockyview General Hospital and the South Health Campus and a children's acute care hospital; Alberta Children's Hospital, all running under the auspices of Alberta Health Services, the single provincial health authority for the province, that delivers medical care on behalf of the Ministry of Health. The medical helicopters operate under the auspices of the Shock Trauma Air Rescue Society. The Sheldon M. Chumir Centre, the Richmond Road Diagnostic and Treatment Centre, Libin Cardiovascular Institute of Alberta, Arthur J.E. Child Comprehensive Cancer Centre, Grace Women's Health Centre, Carewest, and the Glenmore Auxiliary Hospital are other medical facilities operating in the city, each providing a variety of care. The University of Calgary Medical Clinic also operates in partnership with the Calgary Health Region, and is located at the Foothills Medical Centre. The four largest Calgary hospitals have a combined total of more than 2,164 beds, and employ over 11,500 people.

== Primary Care Networks ==
Primary Care Networks (PCNs) are a key component of community-based healthcare delivery in Calgary. These networks are collaborations between family physicians and [Alberta Health Services], designed to improve access to primary care and coordinate services such as chronic disease management, mental health support, and preventative health programs. PCNs employ team-based approaches by integrating professionals like nurses, dietitians, social workers, and pharmacists into patient care.

Calgary is home to several PCNs, including:

Bow Valley PCN

Calgary Foothills PCN

Calgary Rural PCN

Calgary West Central PCN

Highland PCN

Mosaic PCN

South Calgary PCN

Patients are typically affiliated with a PCN based on the location of their family physician.

To help address ongoing physician shortages and rising healthcare demand, Calgary's PCNs employ a variety of strategies, including team-based care models, preventive health programs, and the expanded use of allied health professionals. They also leverage digital health technologies to improve service delivery. Electronic medical records (EMRs) such as Ava EMR or Wolf EMR are widely used to enhance clinical documentation, care coordination, and communication across teams.

== History of physician care in Calgary ==
The Medical Profession Act was passed after Alberta became a province in 1905. In 1906, the College of Physicians and Surgeons of Alberta (CPSA) was formed in Calgary, covering physician licensing and discipline, followed shortly after by the forming of the Canadian Medical Association, Alberta Division (renamed the Alberta Medical Association in the 1960s), an educational body also concerned with standards of care acting in concert with the CPSA.

The University of Alberta (U of A) took over from the CPSA in licensing physicians after 1910. Afterwards, the public health nursing service was also established to carry out preventive health care and public education, as physicians became concerned with insufficient numbers.

After 1920, the CPSA retained licensing and discipline functions and also took over the "business" side, such as collecting dues and representing the profession in relation to legislation. In turn, the AMA became responsible for education and public relations.

In 1931, annual physician refresher courses were subsidized by the AMA and held at the U of A.

In the 1940s, more than 90% of Albertans received prepaid medical care due to the government-created Medical Services (Alberta), until replaced by compulsory federal medicare in 1969.

In the 1960s, the AMA took over activities related to fees and benefits paid on behalf of patients under government insurance, as well as most committee work involving health matters. The AMA was formally constituted under the Societies Act of Alberta at this time.

In the 1970s, in response to increased illicit drug use in the 1960s, the Alberta Alcoholism and Drug Abuse Commission AADAC is established.

On 1 January 1975, the AMA became a free standing voluntary organization, financially independent of the CPSA.

== See also ==
- Calgary Health Region
- Healthcare in Canada
- List of hospitals in Canada
