= Sheldon M. Chumir Centre =

- Calgary Health Region
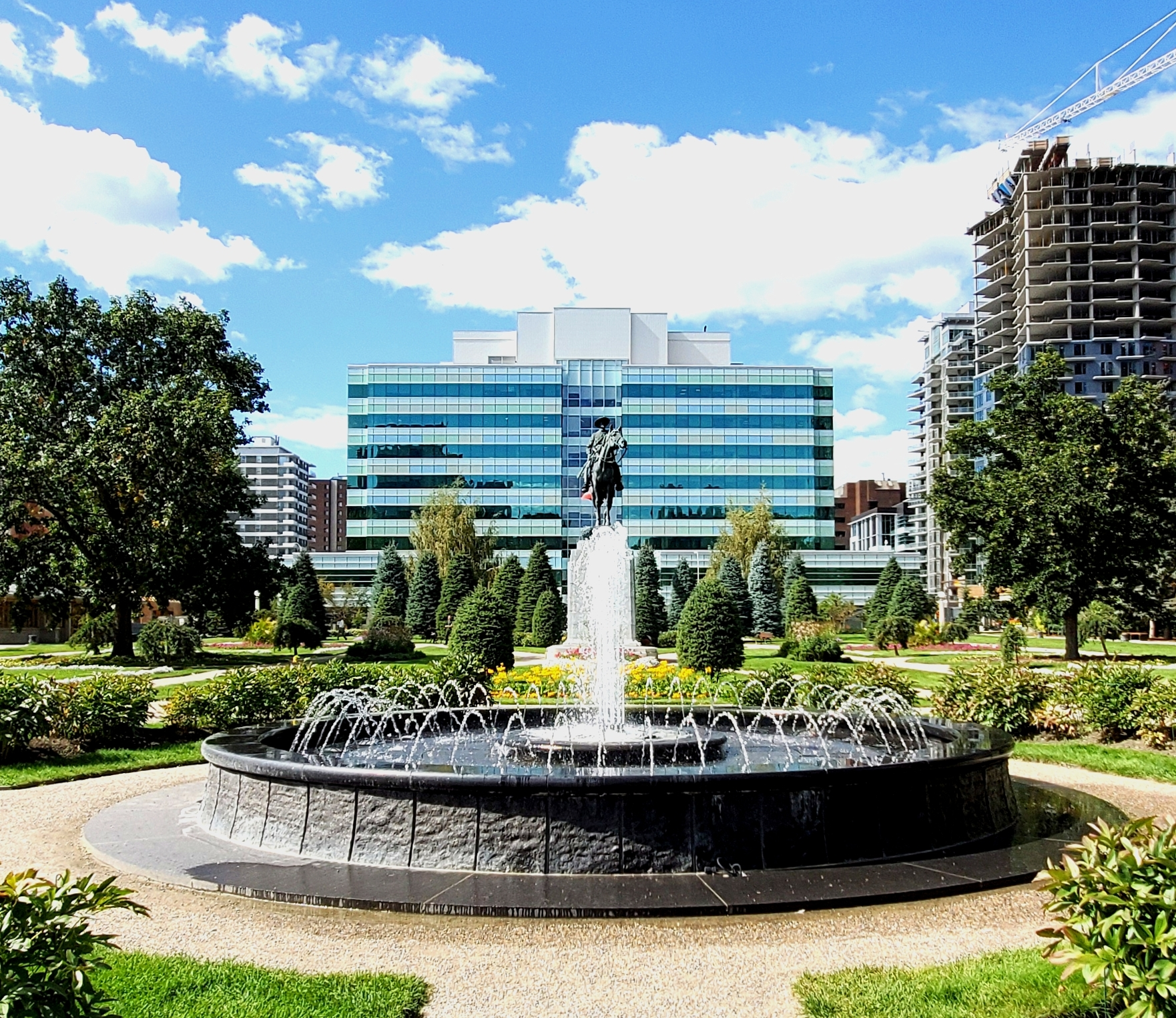
- The Sheldon M. Chumir Centre, adjacent to Central Memorial Park, in Calgary

- Shown in Calgary

Geography
- Location: Beltline, Calgary, Alberta, Canada
- Coordinates: 51.0412°N 114.0720°W

Organization
- Care system: Public Medicare (Canada)
- Type: Community

History
- Founded: April 1, 2008 (Opened)

Links
- Website: Alberta Health Services
- Lists: Hospitals in Canada

The Sheldon M. Chumir Centre is a health centre located in Calgary, Alberta. The facility is administered by the Calgary Zone of Alberta Health Services. The centre provides 24/7 Urgent Care services but is not a full-service hospital and does not admit any patients for overnight stays.

== History ==
The Sheldon M. Chumir Health Centre opened early Spring 2008 at the site of the former Colonel Belcher Veterans hospital. The facility is named for Sheldon Chumir, an Alberta civil liberties lawyer and long-time Liberal Party Member of the Legislative Assembly for Alberta who represented constituents in Calgary in the provincial government.

On October 30, 2017, supervised consumption site was added to the centre.

== Services/Facility ==
The Centre provides 24/7 urgent care and other services such as diagnostic imaging, Calgary Laboratory Services, the Southern Alberta HIV Clinic (SAC), Sexual and Reproductive Health, STI Clinic, and all associated areas such as health records, support services, and admitting. and has been operational since April 1, 2008.

The centre hosts the Safeworks supervised consumption site. Plans to move once suitable location is found was announced in July 2021 Alberta Health Services still lists Safeworks at the centre as of August 2023.

== Reception ==
Calgary Police Service reported in its report, a dramatic spike in crime and drug related calls since the addition of drug consumption site to the centre in October 2017 A 276% increase in drug-related calls in the buffer zone, a 47% increase in violence and a 45% increase in break and enter compared to the three-year average, according to police. Increase in crime such as hustling stolen property, auto thefts and prowling and other property crime was noted in the immediate vicinity of the SCS.

As a part of their investigation, Calgary police was able to make a drug buy in the center. The dealer accepted the money on the street while the substance was handed to the investigator within the Safeworks supervised consumption site inside the centre.

As of October 2024, the province is considering the closure of Safeworks in favor of recovery approach.
