= South Health Campus =

- Alberta Health Services
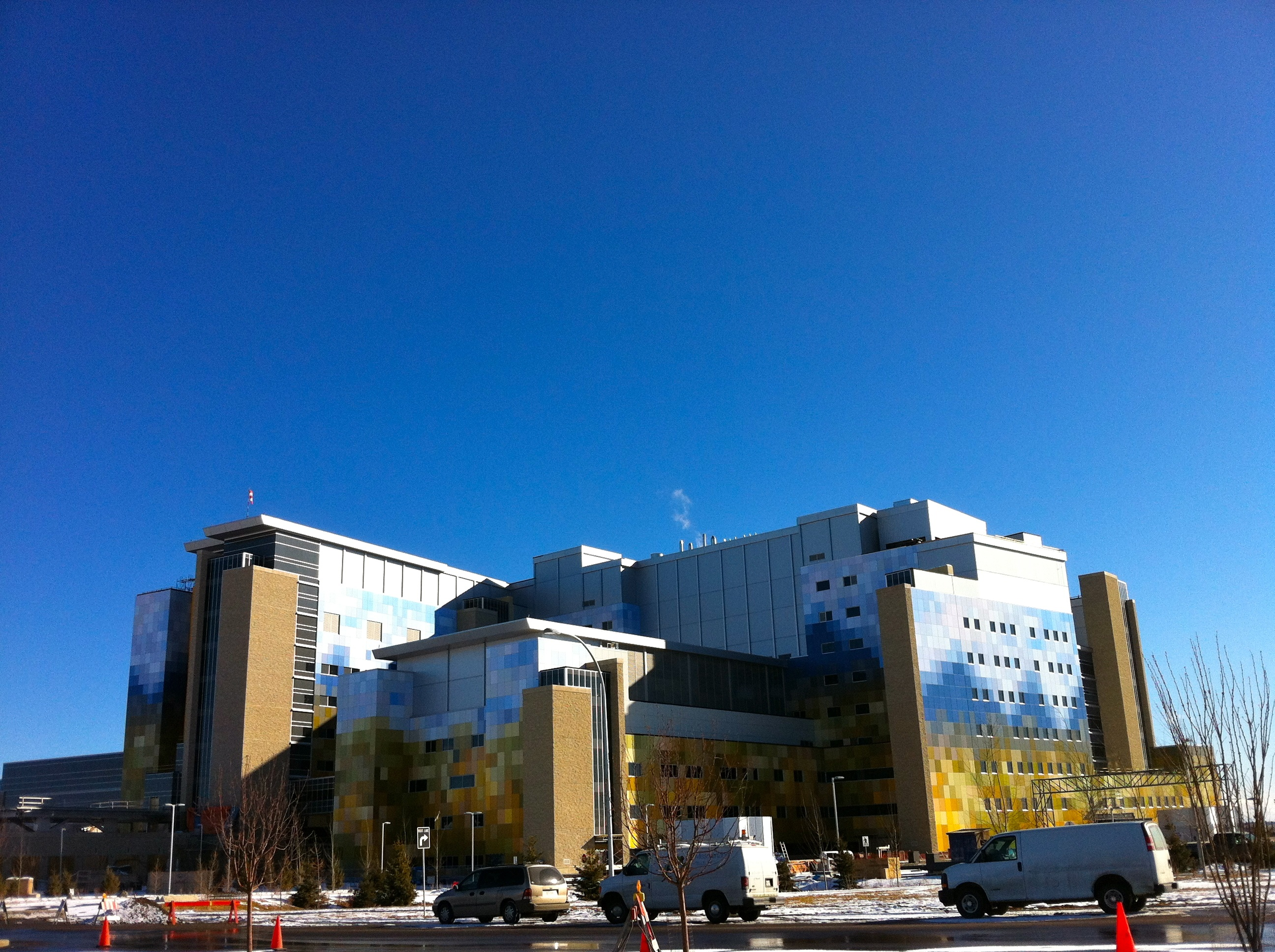
- SHC in the winter

- Location in Calgary

Geography
- Location: 4448 - Front St SE, Calgary, Alberta, Canada
- Coordinates: 50.882778°N 113.951944°W

Organization
- Care system: Public Medicare (Canada)

Services
- Emergency department: Yes
- Beds: 642

Helipads
- Helipad: TC LID: CSH3

Links
- Website: South Health Campus
- Lists: Hospitals in Canada

South Health Campus (SHC) is a large hospital in Calgary, in Alberta, Canada. It is administered by Alberta Health Services.

The building was developed by Alberta Infrastructure, and the first phase was built at a cost of $1.31 billion. The South Health Campus was fully operational by 2016. It has the capacity to handle 800,000 ambulatory visits per year, and it performs approximately 3000 births every year. It includes a 24-hour emergency department, an intensive care unit (ICU), as well as day surgery units. Services are provided for a wide range of acute and chronic health conditions. The facility currently serves 400,000 outpatients annually.

The entire facility (including planned future additions) has been designed for 2,400 full-time-equivalent staff, including 180 physicians, along with 644 inpatient beds and 11 operating rooms.

In terms of physical infrastructure, the building exterior colour scheme is designed to reflect the landscape hallmarks of prairie, forest, and clear blue sky. This state-of-the-art concrete-and-steel complex has a floor area of one million square feet. Emergency power is provided by a set of ten diesel generators with total power output of 28 megawatts.

== Programs and Services ==
The facility offers a number of programs and services:

- 24 Hour Blood Pressure Monitoring Service
- Addiction Services - Adolescent Outpatient
- Advanced Venous Access Service
- Amyotrophic Lateral Sclerosis Clinic
- Anticoagulation Management Services
- Atrial Fibrillation Clinic
- Bone Clinic
- Breast Health and Breast Reconstruction
- Bronchoscopy Services
- Calgary Headache Assessment & Management Program
- Cardiac Arrhythmia Service
- Cardiac Devices ( Pacemaker and ICD) Services
- Cardiology - Electrocardiogram Services
- Cardiology - Inpatients
- Cardiovascular Laboratories - Echocardiography
- Cardiovascular Laboratories - Nuclear Cardiology
- Cast Clinic
- Clinical Neurophysiology Lab
- Consultation Liaison Service - Mental Health
- Day Surgery
- Department of Family Medicine, Family Medicine Clinic
- Diagnostic Imaging and Camera Services
- Emergency Services
- Endocrinology Services
- Epilepsy Care Clinic
- Exercise Stress Test
- Gastrointestinal Services - Outpatients
- General Internal Medicine Clinic
- General Medicine - Inpatients
- Gynecology - Inpatients
- Gynecology - Outpatients
- Gynecology - Procedure Room and Operating Room
- Hand Clinic
- Heart Function Clinic
- Hematology - Outpatients
- Hepatology Clinic
- Hip and Knee Clinic
- Holter Monitoring
- Home Parenteral Therapy Program
- Infectious Diseases
- Intensive Care Services - Critical Care Medicine
- Internal Medicine Urgent Care Clinic
- Interventional Radiology/Angiography
- Laboratory Services
- Maternity Care with Ultrasound and Outpatient Clinic
- Medical Day Treatment
- Minor Surgery Clinic
- Mobile Response Team
- Multiple Sclerosis Clinic
- Neurology - Outpatients
- Neurology - Inpatients
- Neuromuscular Clinic
- Obstetrical Care - Single Room Maternity and Operating Room Access
- Orthopaedic Services - Inpatients
- Orthopaedic Services - Outpatients
- Patient E-mail Well Wishes
- Plastic surgery consultation and surgical intervention
- Post Anaesthetic Care Unit
- Pre-Admission Clinic
- Psychiatric Emergency Services
- Psychiatry - Inpatient
- Psychiatry Analysis
- Pulmonary Diagnostics Unit
- Rapid Access Unit
- Rheumatology - Outpatients
- Surgical Outpatient Clinic
- Transition Services - Acute Care
- Urgent Neurology Clinic
- Volunteer Resources

== Alberta Health Services ==
The South Health Campus is one of twelve hospitals in the Calgary zone that has a population of 1,408,606 and an average life expectancy of 82.9 years.

== Parking ==
The South Health Campus has three parking lots with payment options including passes: visitor/patient monthly ($85), weekly ($41), daily ($14.25) or half-hour ($2.00 per half hour or portion) with some discounts for seniors, etc., with authorization forms. A general monthly pass with no authorization form costs $125 if available. one of the lots is designated for Emergency parking.

== Wellness Centre ==
The Wellness Centre at the South Health Campus is home to many different programs and services such as a YMCA, Wellness Kitchen, and a Resource and Knowledge Centre. Includes a climbing wall with auto belay system, weight room with a track. The Facilities do not include a pool, courts, or steam room.

== See also ==
- Alberta Health Services
- Health care in Calgary
- Health care in Canada
- List of hospitals in Canada
- Libin Cardiovascular Institute of Alberta
