= Peter Lougheed Centre =

- Alberta Health Services
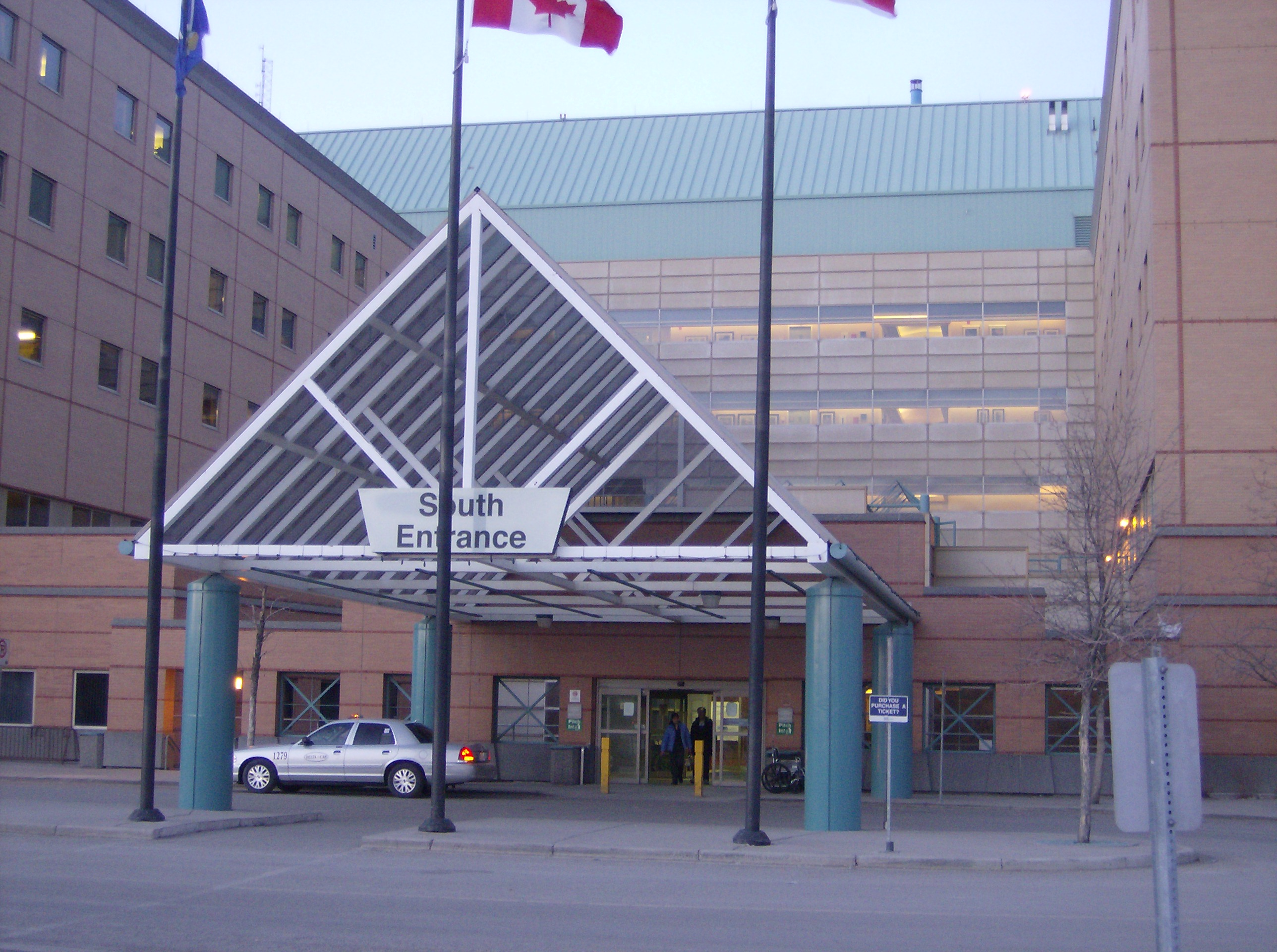
- The main entrance of the Peter Lougheed Centre

- Location in Calgary

Geography
- Location: 3500 26 Ave NE, Calgary, Alberta, Canada
- Coordinates: 51.079°N 113.984°W

Organization
- Care system: Public, Medicare

Services
- Emergency department: Yes
- Beds: 600+

Helipads
- Helipad: TC LID: CLC3

History
- Founded: 1988

Links
- Website: www.albertahealthservices.ca/findhealth/facility.aspx?id=2
- Lists: Hospitals in Canada

Peter Lougheed Centre (PLC) is a 506,000 square foot hospital in Calgary, Alberta, Canada. It is under the auspices of Alberta Health Services, formerly the Calgary Health Region, providing medical and surgical services to Calgary but also Southern Alberta. The PLC has a 24 hours emergency department, an intensive care unit (ICU), and offers ambulatory care. It was named after Peter Lougheed, who served as premier of Alberta from 1971 to 1985. The hospital opened in 1988 with 500 beds, and today contains over 600 beds. The new East Wing was completed in 2008 and includes 140 inpatient beds, as well as a new intensive care and coronary care unit. It was also designed with a new roof-top helipad for emergency services.

== Clinics ==
There are 34 clinics served at the PLC:

- Adult Congenital Heart
- Amputee
- Asthma/Lung Health
- Behavioral Development
- Breast Feeding
- Bronchoscopy
- Cardiology
- Cast
- Cystoscopy
- Diabetes in Pregnancy
- Emergency Cast
- Enterostomal Therapy
- Family Day Medicine
- Fetal Assessment
- General Surgery
- Geriatric Assessment
- Gerontology
- Hand Plastics
- Hematology/Oncology
- Home Parenteral Therapy Program
- Minor Surgery
- Neurology
- Obstetrical Assessment
- Outpatient Carbogen
- Pacemaker
- Pediatric and Adult Pre op Assessment
- Private Pediatric
- Psychiatric Day
- Psychiatric Emergency
- Psychiatric Forensic Assess
- Psychiatric Outpatient Services
- Rheumatology
- Tracheostomy
- Urgent Referral

In addition, ambulatory care includes Cardiac Diagnostics, Medicine, Respiratory, GI, [Neurodiagnostics and Gynecology Outpatient services.

== Parking ==
Peter Lougheed Centre has four parking lots with payment options including passes: monthly ($85), weekly ($41), daily ($13) or half-hour ($2.00 per half-hour or portion) with some discounts for seniors, etc., with authorization forms. Some parking lots/stalls are designated for people with disabilities only.

== See also ==
- Alberta Health Services
- Health care in Calgary
- Health care in Canada
- List of hospitals in Canada
- Libin Cardiovascular Institute of Alberta
