= Foothills Medical Centre =

- Alberta Health Services
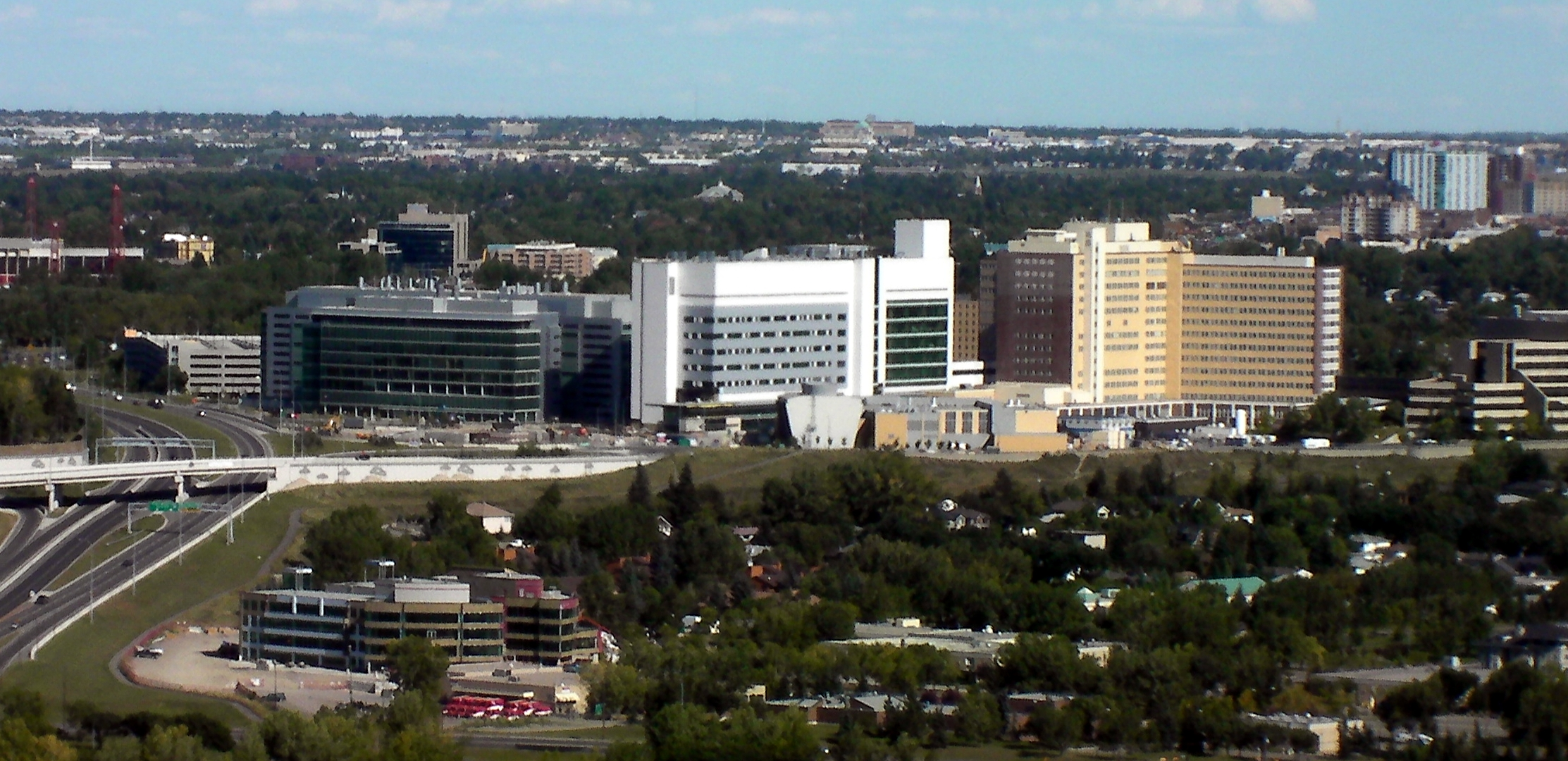
- Foothills Medical Centre complex

- Location in Calgary

Geography
- Location: 1403 - 29 St. N.W., Calgary, Alberta, Canada
- Coordinates: 51.065389°N 114.133306°W

Organization
- Care system: Public Medicare (Canada)
- Type: Research, teaching
- Affiliated university: University of Calgary

Services
- Emergency department: Yes, lead trauma centre
- Beds: 1,100+

Helipads
- Helipad: TC LID: CMT3

History
- Founded: 1966; 60 years ago

Links
- Website: www.albertahealthservices.ca/fmc/fmc.aspx
- Lists: Hospitals in Canada

Foothills Medical Centre (FMC) is the largest hospital in the province of Alberta and is located in the city of Calgary. Foothills Medical Centre provides healthcare services to over two million people from Calgary, and surrounding regions including southern Alberta, southeastern British Columbia, and southern Saskatchewan. Formerly operated by the Calgary Health Region, it is now under the authority of Alberta Health Services and part of the University of Calgary Medical Centre.

The main building of the hospital was opened in June 1966. It was originally named Foothills Provincial General Hospital and later known simply as Foothills Hospital. With the addition of other medical facilities, it became known by its present name.

== Information ==
Foothills Medical Centre functions as a lead trauma centre, one of 10 trauma centres in Alberta, and the largest regional trauma centre in Southern Alberta. In addition, Foothills Medical Centre is accredited by Accreditation Canada for stroke rehabilitation. Foothills Medical Centre works in conjunction with the nearby University of Calgary for the purposes of educating students as well as providing facilities for medical research.

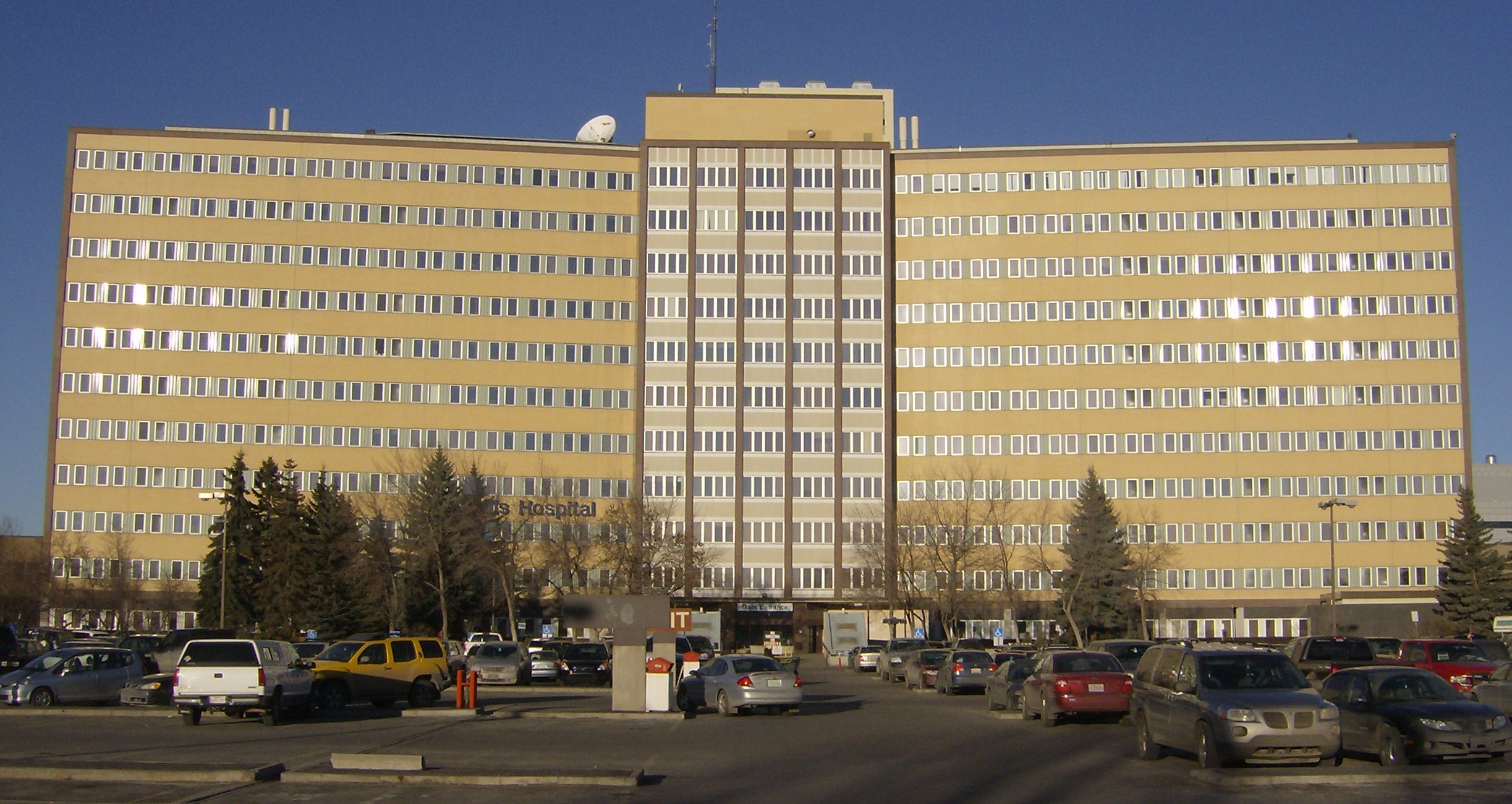
The main building of the Foothills Medical Centre

FMC includes the University of Calgary Cumming School of Medicine, Hotchkiss Brain Institute, as well as the Special Services Building (where most other medical services are provided) and the Arthur J.E. Child Comprehensive Cancer Centre, which is a leading centre in Alberta for cancer treatment and research. The large site also features Grace Women's Health Centre, which specializes in women's health, the Health Sciences Association of Alberta, as well as both the North Tower and South Tower, which offer many outpatient services. The head office of Libin Cardiovascular Institute of Alberta is located on the 8th floor of the Foothills Medical Centre. The TRW Building was also added to the Health Sciences building, which was completed in late 2005. In addition, the new McCaig Tower opened in October 2010 with 93 inpatient beds, 36 bed intensive care unit (only 28 funded by the Government of Alberta), 21 short-stay beds (a total of 150 additional beds), as well as 8 operating rooms. In November 2011, the newly designed Intensive Care Unit (ICU) was awarded the 2012 Design Citation for being "one of the best in the world". The neighbouring Alberta Children's Hospital and west side of the University of Calgary campus are accessible from FMC via University Boulevard.

Apart from these distinctions, FMC has a movable MRI machine, which was introduced in January 2009. It will help patients at the Foothills Medical Centre (FMC) receive surgery. In addition, the world's first robotic surgery to remove a brain tumour was performed on a patient at the FMC, which also created a landmark in Canadian medical history. In June 2010, the Calgary Stroke Program, an initiative of the Foothills Medical Centre, was awarded the "Stroke Services Distinction" and is recognized as one of two leading stroke centres in Canada, the other in Toronto, by Accreditation Canada.

== Alberta Health Services ==
The Foothills Medical Centre is one of twelve hospitals in the Calgary zone, which has a population of 1,408,606 and an average life expectancy of 82.9 years.

== Current description ==
In addition to a 24-hour emergency room and inpatient care, FMC has 57 outpatient clinics on site. This facility provides comprehensive and specialized medical and surgical services to Calgary and Southern Alberta:

- 33 bed intensive care unit and 24 bed cardiac intensive care unit
- Lead Trauma centre for Southern Alberta
- 8 bed burn unit
- 28 operating theatres - including a specially designated trauma operating room
- High risk maternity and neonatal intensive care unit
- PARTY Program (Prevent Alcohol & Risk Related Trauma in Youth Program for Grade 9 secondary school students)
- PADIS (poison & drug information)
- Southern Alberta Renal Program
- Intraoperative MR - magnetic resonance system (first of its kind in the world, located in the Seaman's Family MR Research Centre)
- Stephenson Cardiac MR Centre - the leading cardiac magnetic resonance facility in Canada, as measured by number of peer-reviewed articles published, and part of the Libin Cardiovascular Institute of Alberta
- Multiple transplantation such as kidney, pancreas, corneal and tissue transplants
- HOPE Program (Human Organ Procurement and Exchange)
- University of Calgary Medical Clinic (UCMC) clinics
- The Colon Cancer Screening Centre - providing screening colonoscopies to hundreds of patients a month

== Chronology of hospital projects ==
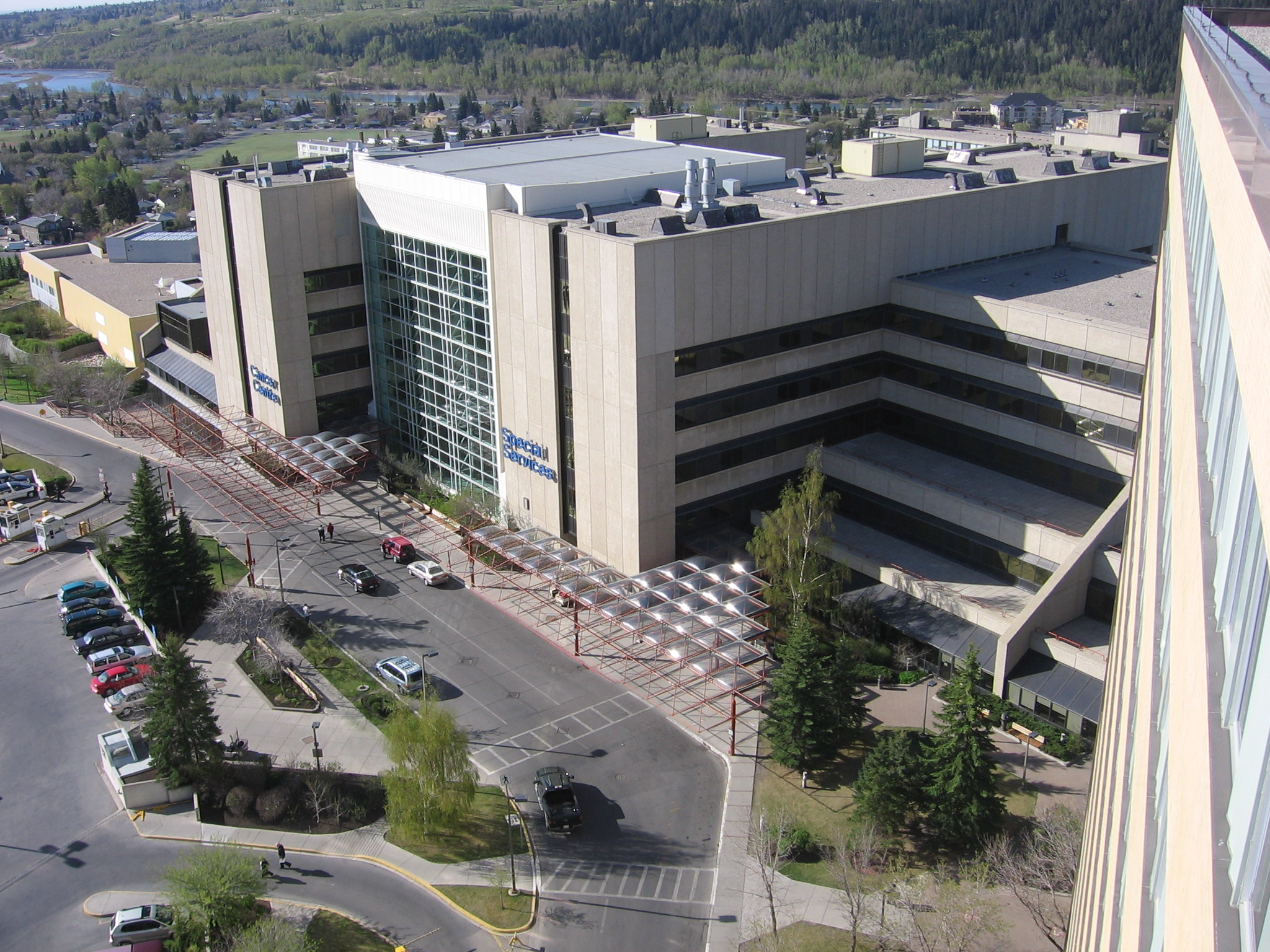
Special Services Building as seen from Foothills Hospital

1958

- Provincial and territorial hospital insurance plans. The Prime Minister of Canada, John Diefenbaker, declares federal grants are available to provincial hospital-care projects, 50 cents on the dollar financing, from Ottawa.

1965

- Main building completed, Foothills Hospital.
- First school of nursing class begins study.

1966

- February, main Hospital Phase II complete.
- April, first out-patients and glaucoma laboratory.
- June, Foothills Hospital opens.

During opening year, "Patient Care" booklet describes new hospital:

"Largest completely new hospital of its kind constructed in North America; 765,000 square feet (71,100 m^{2}) of floor space; 2,000 rooms. Patient capacity: 766 beds, 116 bassinettes, 15 day care beds. Staff when the hospital is in full operation: 1,200-1,500. Cost: $21,000,000 for construction of hospital, School of Nursing and Power Plant — $5,000,000 for initial equipment. T-shaped hospital building, 12 storeys plus basement. The cross-piece of the T includes all nursing units. The back wing, or stem of the T, is 10 storeys high and includes all clinical and other service departments. A 100 bed auxiliary hospital is planned for later construction on site; also a 370 bed psychiatric hospital which will be operated under separate administration. Capital financing for construction was by the usual Federal Provincial grants plus a $17 million debenture issue to be retired by the Provincial Government over a 20-year period. Operation costs will be met by the standard per diem payments made under Alberta Hospitalization Benefits. Complete hospital control is vested in the board of Management."

- Pathology labs (medical laboratory) begins using advanced equipment to provide a complete pathology service.
- Residence for 329 nursing students is linked as teaching hospital support of Foothills Hospital.
- Planning continues for 100-bed auxiliary hospital and 370 beds for psychiatric patients.
- 1966 to 2007 and beyond

Hospital expands, largest hospital of the province of Alberta to be Foothills Medical Centre.

2001

- November, new 14-bed inpatient stroke unit, Unit 100.

2006

- October 19, as part of a C$1.7 billion expansion for Foothills Medical Centre the Calgary Health Region named the new tower the JR (Bud) McCaig Tower after well-known local philanthropist, Bud McCaig. McCaig who had died in 2005 was the founder of Alberta Bone & Joint Health Institute.

2010

- C$460M 8-storey tower, JR (Bud) McCaig Tower.

JR (Bud) McCaig Tower adds to largest hospital of province Alberta:

2017 (2023)

- C$1.4B Calgary Cancer Centre.

Construction begins to add new building to largest hospital in Alberta:

== In popular culture ==
The Foothills Medical Centre is alluded to in the Tragically Hip song "Take Forever" from the album Now for Plan A. The song's lyrics "Calgary, to have my heart attack; Calgary, the place to do it, it's a fact" reference to the angioplasty treatment available at the hospital and a 2010 study completed by University of Calgary researchers.

== See also ==
- Alberta Health Services
- Health care in Calgary
- Health care in Canada
- List of hospitals in Canada
- Libin Cardiovascular Institute of Alberta
