= Rockyview General Hospital =

- Alberta Health Services
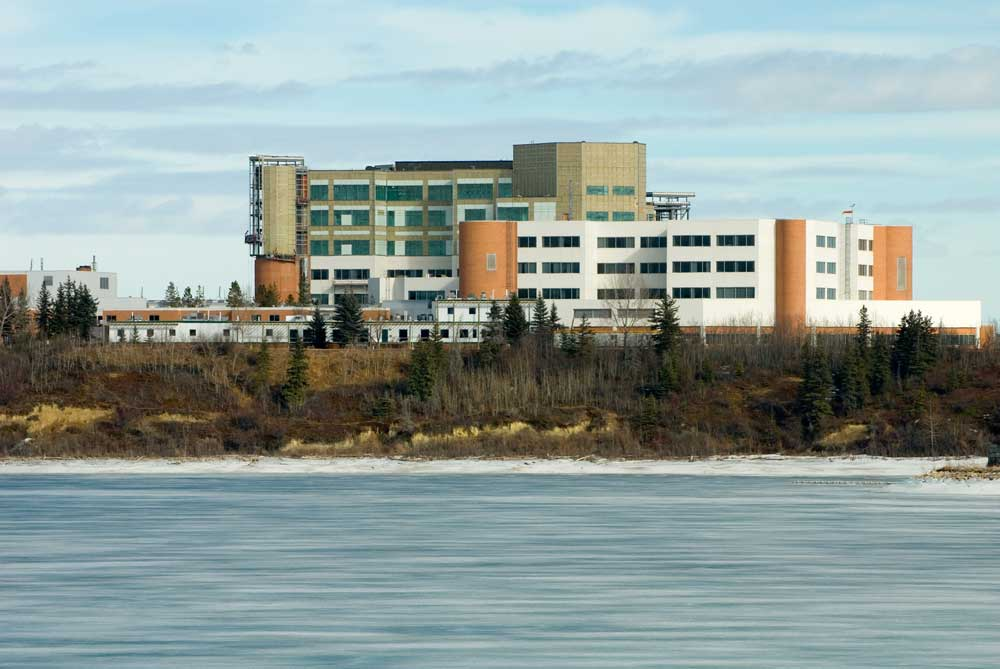
- RGH overlooking the Glenmore Reservoir

- Location in Calgary

Geography
- Location: 7007 14 Street SW; Calgary, Alberta, Canada
- Coordinates: 50.9907°N 114.0974°W

Organization
- Care system: Public Medicare (Canada)
- Type: District General

Services
- Emergency department: Yes
- Beds: 650+

Helipads
- Helipad: TC LID: CEM2

History
- Founded: 1966

Links
- Website: www.albertahealthservices.ca/facilities.asp?pid=facility&rid=3
- Lists: Hospitals in Canada

Rockyview General Hospital (RGH) is a large hospital. It is located in the city of Calgary, Alberta, Canada, on the shores of the Glenmore Reservoir and is administered by Alberta Health Services and formerly by the Calgary Health Region.

The hospital contains over 650 beds and provides medical and surgical services to Calgary and Southern Alberta. The RGH is noted for its comprehensive urology department, and is becoming the leader in Canada for urological care. It includes a 24-hour emergency department, an intensive care unit (ICU), as well as day surgery units. It offers a Maternal Newborn Program, mental health and psychiatric services, as well as senior's health and ambulatory care. The Lions Eye Bank, which is a regional centre for recovery of donated eye tissue for corneal transplants, is located at RGH.

The building was designed by Culham Pedersen Valentine, and built at a cost of $90 million. It had a total surface of 69,952 m^{2} (752,960 sq ft), and an additional 23,000 m^{2} (250,000 sq ft) were added in 1995. Further expansion in 2004 added another 100 beds.

The hospital underwent expansion and upgrades, with two operating theatres added to the surgical suite, and vertical expansion of the Highwood Building. The construction included an additional 100 inpatient beds, as well as three stories added to the hospital's North Tower, and five stories to the south side of the hospital. These expansions were completed in 2008.

== Clinics ==
The facility contains 19 clinics:

- Breast Feeding
- Bronchoscopy
- Cast
- Cystoscopy
- Enterostomal Therapy
- Emergency Cast
- General Ante-partum
- General Cardiology
- Hand
- Home Visit
- Infectious Disease
- Medical Geriatric
- OBS Gyne
- Ophthalmology
- Orthopedic
- Outreach
- Pacemaker
- Pain
- Pre-op Assessment

Ambulatory care include Medicine, Respiratory, GI/GU, Surgery, Diabetes in Pregnancy, Pulmonary Respiratory Exercise Program, Lithotripsy, Pacemaker Clinic, Paediatric Clinic, Geriatric Outpatient Consultation and Geriatric Mental Health.

== See also ==
- Alberta Health Services
- Health care in Calgary
- Health care in Canada
- List of hospitals in Canada
- Libin Cardiovascular Institute of Alberta
