= Arthur J.E. Child Comprehensive Cancer Centre =

Arthur J.E. Child Comprehensive Cancer Centre at the Foothills Medical Centre
- Alberta Health Services

Geography
- Location: 3395 - Hospital Dr. N.W., Calgary, Alberta, Canada
- Coordinates: 51.066667°N 114.1308339°W

Organization
- Care system: Public Medicare (Canada)
- Type: Teaching
- Affiliated university: University of Calgary

Services
- Beds: 160
- Speciality: Medical oncology

History
- Founded: 2024

Links
- Lists: Hospitals in Canada

Arthur J.E. Child Comprehensive Cancer Centre (ACCC) is a over 2 million square foot tertiary care facility that replaced the Tom Baker Cancer Centre, and is one of two tertiary cancer centres in the province. It features 160 inpatient unit beds, wet and dry research labs, clinical and operational support services, clinical trials unit and research laboratories, Systemic and radiation treatment services, including 15 radiation vaults and on-site underground parking with 1,650 stalls. The Centre is the largest comprehensive cancer centre in Canada and the second largest in North America.

== History ==
The Arthur J.E. Child Comprehensive Cancer Centre officially opened its doors in 2024, established to centralize cancer treatment services in Alberta. On June 28, 2023, the Arthur J.E. Child Foundation made a landmark donation of $50 million to the project. In recognition of this extraordinary contribution, the facility was formally named the Arthur J.E. Child Comprehensive Cancer Centre.

== See also ==
- Cross Cancer Institute
- Alberta Health Services
- Health care in Calgary
- Health care in Canada
- List of hospitals in Canada
