= Cross Cancer Institute =

Hospital in Edmonton, Alberta, Canada

- Alberta Health Services

Geography
- Location: 11560 University Avenue, Edmonton, Alberta, Canada
- Coordinates: 53°31′4″N 113°31′53″W

Organization
- Care system: Medicare
- Type: Research, Teaching
- Affiliated university: University of Alberta

History
- Founded: 1968

Links
- Website: www.albertacancer.ca/cross-cancer-institute
- Lists: Hospitals in Canada

Cross Cancer Institute is the comprehensive cancer centre for northern Alberta. The institute, named for Wallace Warren Cross, is located in Edmonton near the southwest corner of the University of Alberta, and is one of two tertiary cancer centres in the province. The Cross Cancer Institute is a lead centre for the province-wide prevention, research and treatment program. The centre provides inpatient and outpatient services for cancer patients, advanced medical and supportive cancer care, and patient and professional education. The Cross Cancer Institute conducts research through the Alberta Cancer Research Institute.

The Department of Oncology, a branch of the University of Alberta's Faculty of Medicine and Dentistry, is located at the Cross Cancer Institute. The department offers training in medical oncology, radiation oncology, palliative care medicine, and medical physics.

== See also ==
- Arthur J.E. Child Comprehensive Cancer Centre
- Alberta Health Services
