= Nunavut Health Care Plan =

The Nunavut Health Care Plan (Inuktitut: ᓄᓇᕗᒻᒥᑦ ᐋᓐᓂᐊᕕᓕᐊᖅᑐᕐᓯᐅᑎᑦ, French: Régime d’assurance-maladie du Nunavut) is the government health plan of the Canadian territory of Nunavut. All residents of Nunavut (with some exceptions) residing in the territory for at least three months with the intention of staying for at least twelve are eligible for coverage under the plan.
