= Hospitalization Benefits Plan =

Alberta Hospitalization Benefits describes health law for the province of Alberta, Canada. Chapter 3 of the Hospitals Act is the Hospitalization Benefits Plan.

Origins include the 1919 Municipal Hospitals Act, national Health Services Act of 1944, and the provincial Lloydminster Hospital Act of 1947.

Amongst other things the law defines:

- Insured services
- Entitlement to insured services
- Recovery of cost of services
- Payment for insured services
- Operating costs
- Debentures
- Group contracts
- Agreements
- Use of word "hospital"
