= Alberta Children's Hospital =

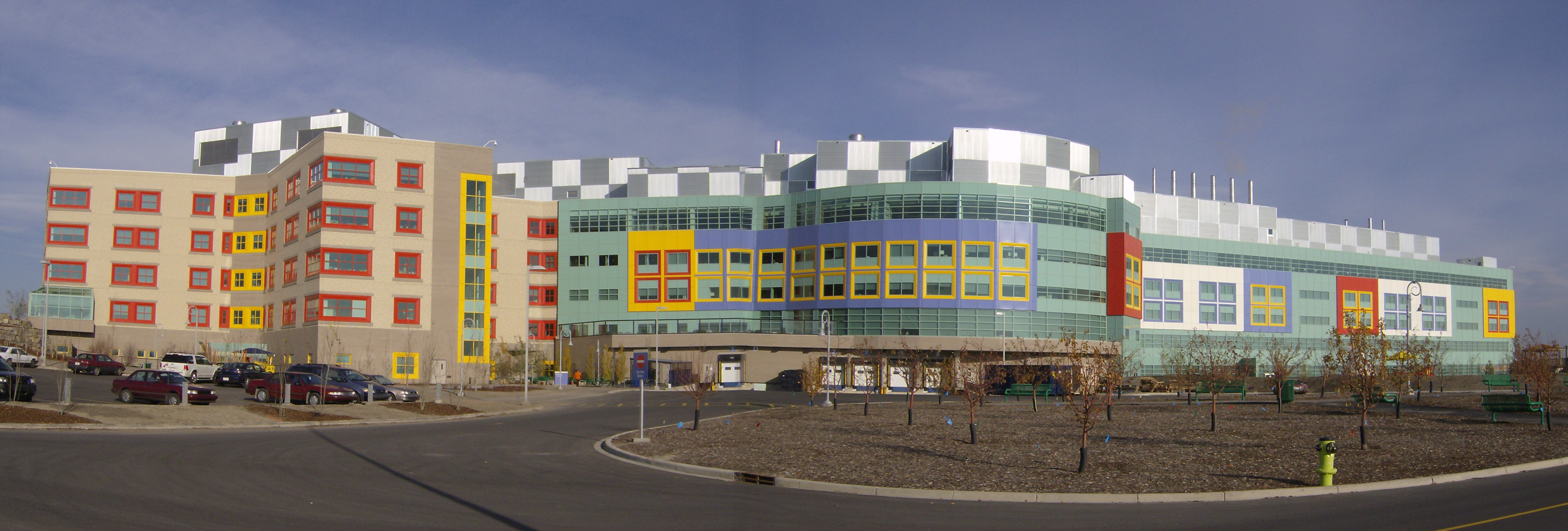
- Alberta Children's Hospital

- Location of Alberta Children's Hospital in Calgary

Geography
- Location: 28 Oki Drive NW; Calgary, Alberta, Canada
- Coordinates: 51.074444°N 114.148056°W

Organization
- Care system: Public Medicare (Canada)
- Type: Specialist

Services
- Emergency department: Yes, Level 1 Paediatric Trauma Centre
- Beds: 150
- Speciality: Paediatric hospital/Paediatric trauma centre

Helipads
- Helipad: TC LID: CAC6

History
- Founded: May 19, 1922; 104 years ago (as Junior Red Cross Children's Hospital)

Links
- Website: www.childrenshospital.ab.ca
- Lists: Hospitals in Canada

Alberta Children's Hospital (ACH) is a children's hospital located in Calgary, Alberta, Canada and operated by the Calgary Health Region of Alberta Health Services.

It originally opened on May 19, 1922 as the Junior Red Cross Children's Hospital. Its current building, opened on September 27, 2006, is the largest children's hospital in the prairie provinces and was the first free-standing paediatric facility to be built in Canada in more than 20 years. It is located west of the University of Calgary campus grounds and across from the site of the Foothills Medical Centre.

== Design ==
The Alberta Children's Hospital was designed with substantial input from young patients, as well as families, physicians and staff of the hospital. In 2002, architects created renderings of how the hospital could look; a multi-storey brick building. These drawings were brought to the hospital's Teen Advisory Group (TAG) and changed substantially into a colourful building closely resembling toy building blocks.

The idea for the Alberta Children's Hospital was to create a building that would reduce stress and promote healing. The interior of the hospital has been designed to enable the delivery of family centred care. The hospital includes supports for families.

The Alberta Children's Hospital is used by patients from birth to age 18 from southern Alberta, southeastern British Columbia and southwestern Saskatchewan. It is an accredited paediatric level I trauma centre by the Trauma Association of Canada. Additionally, the ACH is the provincial expert and referral centre for bone marrow transplantation, and is the leader in Western Canada for paediatric neurosciences. It also is the only paediatric hospital in Canada with a comprehensive Behavioral Unit, is the world leader in congenital cataracts surgery, and has the largest paediatric vision clinic in all of Western Canada.

The Alberta Children's Hospital Research Institute for Child and Maternal Health (ACHRI) is the Alberta Children's Hospital's affiliated research institute, and has a team of over 150 involved in the study of human development from embryo to adulthood.

== Clinics ==
The facility operates 34 clinics:

- Asthma Clinic
- Burns Clinic
- Cardiology Clinic
- Cleft Palate Clinic
- Cystic Fibrosis Clinic
- Dental Clinic
- Developmental Clinic
- Down Syndrome Clinic
- Diabetes Clinic
- Endocrine Clinic
- Eye Clinic
- Feeding Consultation Service
- Gastro-Intestinal Clinic
- Genetics Clinic
- Haematology Clinic
- Haemophilia Clinic
- Infectious Disease Clinic
- Inherited Metabolic Disorders
- Myelomeningcele Clinic
- Nephrology and Urology Clinic
- Neurology Clinic
- Neuromotor Clinic
- Neuromuscular Clinic
- Neuropsychological Service
- Neuroscience Services
- Neurosurgery Clinic
- Orthopaedic Clinic
- Perinatal Clinic
- Plastics Clinic
- Pulmonary Clinic
- Refractory Epilepsy Clinic
- Regional School Health
- Respiratory Home Care Clinic
- Rheumatology Clinic
- Sleep Service Clinic
- Vascular Malformation Clinic

== See also ==
- Alberta Health Services
- Health care in Calgary
- Health care in Canada
- List of hospitals in Canada
- Libin Cardiovascular Institute of Alberta
