= Medical Service Insurance =

The Medical Service Insurance (MSI) is the Nova Scotian government's health insurance.

The Medical Services Insurance Programs are administered by Medavie Blue Cross for the Nova Scotia government Department of Health Policy Directive.

== Eligibility ==
To be eligible for MSI, you must be a Canadian citizen or permanent resident, a resident who makes their permanent home in Nova Scotia and is present in the province 183 days every calendar year and you must be registered with MSI to be eligible for benefits.

People who are ineligible include regular members of the Royal Canadian Mounted Police and the Canadian Forces, tourists and visitors to the province, students from another province and inmates of federal prisons.

== Related link ==
- Health care in Canada
- Health regions of Nova Scotia
