= Enterostomal therapist =

Medical profession

An enterostomal therapist is a health professional trained in the care of persons with stomas, such as colostomies or urostomies. An enterostomal therapy nurse, or ET nurse, is specialized in treating patients who have ostomies, wounds, or incontinence.
