= Calgary Health Region =

Former Canadian governing body for healthcare

Calgary Health Region was formerly the governing body for healthcare regulation in an area of the Canadian province of Alberta. It was amalgamated with other regional health authorities in 2008 to become part of Alberta Health Services. The region administered facilities in the communities of:

- Airdrie
- Banff
- Black Diamond
- Canmore
- Carmangay
- Claresholm
- Cochrane
- Didsbury
- High River
- Nanton
- Okotoks
- Strathmore
- Vulcan

The entire region was a member of the Planetree Alliance, a nonprofit association of health-care institutions, set up to promote practices to make patients less intimidated and more comfortable with the health care they receive.

== Acute care facilities and health centres ==
Calgary Health Region administered 43 health care centres and 12 acute care sites (hospitals). Hospitals include Alberta Children's Hospital, Foothills Medical Centre, Peter Lougheed Centre, and Rockyview General Hospital in Calgary, Banff Mineral Springs Hospital in Banff, Oilfields General Hospital in Black Diamond, Canmore General Hospital in Canmore, Claresholm General Hospital in Claresholm and High River General Hospital in High River. The Sheldon M. Chumir Centre and Richmond Road Diagnostic Centre (located in the old Alberta Children's Hospital building) became new care facility additions to the Calgary Health Region before the reorganization.

== History ==
The CHR was formerly known as Calgary Regional Health Authority (CRHA) until 2000 when it adopted its new designation. In 2009 sites and services within the former Region were renamed within AHS, many becoming part of the new Calgary Zone.

== Headquarters ==
The Region's former offices in the Southland Park office complex in Southwood, Calgary are still occupied by Alberta Health Services staff, as part of the Calgary Zone of the AHS.
