= Balance billing =

Medical billing practice

Balance billing, sometimes called surprise billing, is a medical bill from a healthcare provider billing a patient for the difference between the total cost of services being charged and the amount the insurance pays. It is a pervasive practice in the United States with providers who are out of network, and therefore not subject to the rates or terms of providers who are in-network. Balance billing has a variable prevalence by market and specialty.

Advocates of balance billing argue that it increases the incomes of high-quality healthcare providers and measures their dissatisfaction with insurance company fees. Critics say that balance billing lets providers raise charges through stealth rather than transparent pricing, creates unnecessary administrative costs and patient confusion, and allows providers to simply pass along costs to patients, rather than helping them to secure good value. It is thought to erode political consensus in favor of a one-tier system of healthcare, and to inhibit some people from getting the care they need, by making that care more expensive.

== Canada ==
Throughout the 1970s in Canada, the country saw an increase in balance billing, which in Canada is normally called extra billing. It was not permitted in Quebec or British Columbia, but had been encouraged in Ontario and Alberta, and tolerated in other provinces. The federal government estimated that by 1983, extra billing across Canada totaled $100 million. The government believed that extra billing enabled the creation of a two-tiered Canadian healthcare system, in which people who could not afford extra charges would receive lesser care.

In 1984, the government passed the Canada Health Act, which promised universal and comprehensive health coverage for all Canadians, and which contained provisions to discourage user fees and extra billing by imposing financial penalties on and reducing transfer payments to provinces that permitted them. In 2002, five provinces prohibit all extra-billing, while Alberta, British Columbia (BC), and Newfoundland allow it in a small number of circumstances, and Prince Edward Island and New Brunswick do not restrict it at all.

In 2003, the BC government enacted the Medicare Protection Amendment Act, which banned extra billing for medical services and diagnostic procedures deemed medically necessary and covered by the provincial Medicare system; however, many of the provisions were not enforced. In 2018, the government announced its intention to implement operational requirements more stringently and to impose financial penalties for extra billing for medically necessary diagnostic procedures. However, enforcement of medical procedures was delayed until after March 31, 2020, and diagnostic procedures until April 1, 2020, because of a court injunction in the case that would ultimately become Cambie Surgeries Corporation v. British Columbia. On September 10, 2020, the Supreme Court of British Columbia dismissed the Cambie plaintiffs' claims. The plaintiffs filed a notice of appeal and in July 2022, the BC Court of Appeal upheld Justice Steeves' decision.

== United States ==
Health insurance in the United States is typically provided by a managed care plan with a preferred or exclusive "network" of providers; balance billing does not occur with providers in-network, as the insurer negotiates an agreed rate ahead of the service. However, out-of-network medical billing has become common for privately insured patients even when they receive care in an in-network hospital, creating a substantial financial burden. Surprise balance billing is when an out-of-network provider bills an individual for services that were not covered by the insurance plan. This is often a surprise because an individual may be unaware that the services were out-of-network or did not actively choose to receive in an inpatient setting. The "growing risk to patients of incurring burdensome unexpected out-of-network bills" has received significant attention in the 21st century.

Out-of-network care in the United States is very common and unavoidable in emergencies. A 2017 study published in Health Affairs concluded that in 2014, one in five inpatient emergency department causes will lead to surprise bills, and that 20% of emergency department admissions, 14% of outpatient visits to the emergency department, and 9% of elective inpatient admissions likely incurred a surprise medical bill. A 2020 Peterson-KFF Health System Tracker found that, "for people in large employer plans, 18% of all emergency visits and 16% of in-network hospital stays had at least one out-of-network charge associated with the care in 2017." However, surprise billing also occurs in planned-care (non-emergency) settings: for example, when a patient receives care at an in-network hospital or ambulatory surgery center, only to subsequently learn that a specific provider or providers providing the treatment (such as an anesthesiologist or radiologist) does not participate in the network of the patient's health plan. In both circumstances, "the patient is not in a position to choose the provider or to determine that provider's insurance network status."

A 2019 Commonwealth Fund report identified 28 U.S. states as having at least some consumer protections relating to balance billing." This was an increase from 2017–2018, when a total of 25 states had at least some protections against surprise billing. Only nine states had comprehensive consumer protections relating to balance billing at the end of 2018. That number rose to 13 states in 2019. Researchers consider a state to offer "comprehensive protections" against surprise bills if the state's law limits a consumer's "financial exposure to normal in-network cost sharing"; bars providers from balance billing; applies to both emergency department and non-emergency care in an in-network hospital; applies to both HMO and PPO enrollees; and creates a method for resolving payment disputes between providers and insurers (either through a specific payment standard or a dispute resolution process). The states with a comprehensive approach are California, Connecticut, Florida, Illinois, Maryland, New York, Colorado, New Mexico, and Texas. A 2020 study found that reforms introduced by New York in 2014 successfully reduced out-of-network billing for emergency care by 88%. Similarly, after Texas enacted an anti-surprise billing law, the Texas Department of Insurance reported receiving up to 95% fewer surprise billing complaints.

In states with a law preventing or restricting surprise billing, commercially insured consumers who receive a surprise bill "may be able to obtain assistance from their state Department of Insurance, though state law protections may not cover all surprise billing situations, and may not cover people with insurance through their job." Consumers who live in states that lack surprise billing protections sometimes negotiate with health care providers to write off a portion of the surprise bill, or for a repayment plan, and sometimes argue to their health insurer for the insurance company to pay a larger proportion of the bill.

The 2019 Commonwealth Fund report found that federal action was needed to comprehensively protect consumers from balance billing, given that (1) only federal law can comprehensively address patients from one state being treated by providers from another state and (2) federal law currently blocks states from enacting protections against surprise billing from air ambulance services. Congress gave the issue serious attention in 2018-2019 with both the House and Senate passing substantive bills out of committee in the summer of 2019.

An American College of Emergency Physicians policy statement on balance billing noted that the Emergency Medical Treatment and Active Labor Act of 1986 requires patients presenting at an emergency department to be treated regardless of insurance coverage or ability to pay as a safety net, and argues that:

Unfortunately, the claims of physicians who provide emergency care for commercially insured services are often paid by health plans at rates that are substantially below the usual and customary value of these services. In the recent past, most plans based the allowed benefit for these services on the 70th or 80th percentile of usual and customary charges, but the database most often used for this purpose underrepresented these charges. ... In response to successful challenges to such flawed databases, some plans have established out-of-network benefit rates that are still substantially below usual and customary payments. Health plans know that emergency medical care must be provided for their enrollees no matter how poorly the plans pay for these services. The lack of a system to ensure fair benefit payments has allowed payers to underpay the fair value of emergency services, creating an imperative to preserve balance billing. Balance billing ensures the ability to provide patient care services where no enforced laws or regulations require health plans to pay appropriate benefits for emergency care claims at rates sufficient to maintain the financial feasibility of the nation's emergency care system.

=== No Surprises Act ===
The No Surprises Act was signed into law as part of the Consolidated Appropriations Act, 2021 on December 27, 2020, and its main protections took effect for plan years beginning on or after January 1, 2022. The law bars balance billing for emergency services, including air ambulance services, and for non-emergency services provided by out-of-network clinicians at in-network hospitals and facilities. In these cases, patient cost sharing is limited to what it would be in network, calculated from a "recognized amount" that is generally the plan's median in-network rate for the service. Federal rules call this median rate the qualifying payment amount (QPA). Ground ambulance services are not covered; the law instead created an advisory committee to recommend options.

For some scheduled, non-emergency care, an out-of-network provider may balance bill if it gives the patient written notice at least 72 hours in advance and obtains written consent. This exception is not available for ancillary services such as anesthesiology, or for diagnostic services such as radiology and laboratory work. Providers generally must also give uninsured and self-pay patients a good faith estimate of expected charges. A patient whose bill exceeds the estimate by at least $400 may use a federal patient-provider dispute resolution process.

Payment disputes between out-of-network providers and health plans go to a 30-day open negotiation period. If that fails, either party may start federal independent dispute resolution (IDR), a "baseball-style" arbitration in which a certified IDR entity picks one of the two final offers. Use of IDR has far exceeded government projections. About 1.4 million disputes were started in the second half of 2025 alone, and providers prevailed in about 85% of decided cases. Researchers at Georgetown University estimated that the IDR process cost $22.4 billion from 2022 through 2025, including awards above in-network rates and administrative costs. They reported that in 2025, when providers prevailed, the median award was 445% of the QPA.

Implementing rules have been challenged repeatedly in court, mostly by the Texas Medical Association. In August 2026, the United States Court of Appeals for the Fifth Circuit, sitting en banc, vacated parts of the federal methodology for calculating the QPA. It held that the QPA should reflect rates for services providers actually furnish, rather than "ghost rates" in contracts for services a provider does not perform, and that bonus and incentive payments should not be excluded. It upheld the exclusion of single-case agreements.

== France ==
In France, physicians who want to charge more than the government-negotiated set fees are considered to be in a separate "payment sector," which essentially means they are treated as self-employed. They can charge higher fees and receive reduced benefits. In 1987, about 27% of French physicians chose to balance the bill. The percentage is higher for specialists rather than generalists and doctors in urban rather than rural areas.

== Germany ==
Balance billing is prohibited in Germany. Fee schedules are negotiated between sickness funds and physicians, and physicians are not permitted to charge more than the set amount.

== Japan ==
Balance billing is prohibited in Japan, and extra fees are only allowed in a small number of circumstances, such as having a hospital bed with extra amenities.

== Taiwan ==
Balance billing is prohibited in Taiwan, and extra fees have only been allowed recently and in rare defined circumstances. Today, patients in Taiwan are allowed to choose more expensive versions of some devices such as stents, implants or prosthetics, and to pay the difference in cost themselves.
