= Brian Day =

English-Canadian surgeon

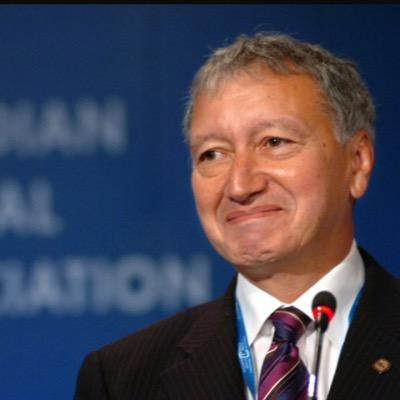
- Dr. Brian Day speaking as president of the CMA in 2008.
- Born: January 29, 1947 (age 79); Liverpool, England
- Education: University of Manchester; University of British Columbia
- Medical career
- Profession: Surgeon
- Field: Orthopedics
- Institutions: Cambie Surgery Centre; UBC Hospital
- Awards: Edouard Samson Award (1979); BC Sports Hall of Fame (2023); FRCP (Lon) (2023); King Charles III Coronation Medal (2025)

Brian Day FRCP (Lon), FRCS (Eng), FRCS (C), (born January 29, 1947) is an orthopedic surgeon and health researcher in Canada, a past president of the Canadian Medical Association, and a prominent, sometimes controversial advocate for expanding private options within health care in Canada, including the use of non-government health insurance alongside the publicly funded system.

Day is also internationally recognized for his pioneering work in arthroscopic sports surgery. In 2023 he became the first orthopaedic surgeon inducted into the BC Sports Hall of Fame, which described him as a world leader in the field. That same year he was made a Fellow of the Royal College of Physicians of London, and in 2025 he received the King Charles III Coronation Medal.

As the founder and medical director of a private clinic, Cambie Surgery Centre and Specialist Referral Clinic in Vancouver, British Columbia, Day was a spokesperson for a high-profile, multi-year and ongoing lawsuit against the provincial government, Cambie Surgeries Corporation v. British Columbia (Medical Services Commission), that ended in 2023 and is sometimes cited publicly as 'The Day Case'.

In 2025, he published My Fight for Canadian Healthcare: A Thirty-Year Battle to Put Patients First, a memoir reflecting on his legal and professional battles for private care in Canada.

== Early life and education ==
Day was raised in Toxteth, a working-class area of post-war Liverpool, England. He was the eldest of four children in a family with strong Labour views. Both his mother and father were socialists. Day has attributed his shift from the political left to the centre-right to his disenchantment with the British labour movement's jurisdictional inertia and contributions to inefficiency in health care.

Day attended the Liverpool Institute, the same high school as two well-known schoolmates, Paul McCartney and George Harrison. His family's neighbourhood could be tough. Day has a permanent scar on a finger from a knife fight when he was 10 years old. His father, a pharmacist, was killed in 1981 by hooligans looking for drugs during riots in the neighbourhood. The possible contribution of misdiagnosis by British doctors for the death of Day's mother in 1986 is cited as his dissatisfaction with the British health system.

Day entered medical school at age 18 at the University of Manchester, from where he graduated in 1970. After an initial interest in general surgery, which he pursued as a postgraduate in Manchester and at the Hammersmith Hospital in London, he focused on orthopaedics. He obtained his medical degrees, MB ChB from the University of Manchester, and post-graduate qualifications in both internal medicine and general surgery. In July 1973, Day moved to Vancouver, British Columbia, Canada. In 1978, Day completed his training and a M.Sc. degree at the University of British Columbia (UBC).

== Medical career ==
In 1979, Day received the Canadian Orthopaedic Association's Edouard Samson Award for outstanding orthopaedic research in Canada. Following a fellowship in traumatology, in Basel, Switzerland, Oxford, and Los Angeles, he began practice at the Vancouver General Hospital. After starting in trauma, he developed an interest and expertise in orthopaedic sports medicine and arthroscopy.

As an orthopedic surgeon, he earned an international reputation for performing arthroscopic surgery on hips, knees, shoulders and elbows. He has been the medical officer for national and international sports teams and events, including the Canadian Davis and Federation Cup teams as well as Olympic teams. International patients have included professional athletes, such as English Premier League players, and Olympic medallists from countries as far away as Russia and Australia, as well as many world-famous celebrities, actors, and dignitaries. Day is regarded as being instrumental in the introduction of arthroscopic joint surgery in Canada.

Day's patients have included athletes from leagues such as the CFL, NHL, NBA and the English Premier League. He has said he chose to treat athletes individually rather than as a salaried club physician, citing potential conflicts between a team's interest in a quick return to play and a player's medical interest. In 2004, at the invitation of orthopaedic surgeon Antonio Castro, he travelled to Cuba to teach arthroscopic techniques and was made an honorary member of the Cuban Orthopaedic Association.

During the early 1980s, Day played a foundational surgical role in the development and implementation of the Arthrobot in Canada, the first robot to assist in surgery, created by a team led by biomedical engineer James McEwen and UBC engineering physics graduate Geof Auchinleck. The Arthrobot system was capable of responding to the surgeon’s voice commands to manipulate and position the patient’s limb during orthopedic surgeries. Building on this work, Day went on in 1984 at UBC Hospital to become the first surgeon in the world to introduce the clinical application of robotics in arthroscopic surgery.

From 1970 to 2014, Day wrote more than 150 scientific articles or book chapters, in areas of orthopaedics and arthroscopic surgery / sports medicine, and on the topic of health policy.

=== Medical association leadership (Canada and North America) ===
Day is a founding member and was 2004 president of the Arthroscopy Association of North America, being the second Canadian elected to that position.

In August 2006, Day was elected president of the Canadian Medical Association (CMA) for the 2007/08 term, despite a challenge at the convention floor by another British Columbian physician (whom Day had beaten in the nomination process) regarding Day's views about for-profit health care. He was the first orthopaedic surgeon in the 148-year history of the CMA to be elected president. Day states that his advocacy as president of CMA was for a hybrid public-private system, not a full replacement by private hospitals. The CMA policy drafted in 2007 was "When access to timely care cannot be provided in the publicly funded system, Canadians should be able to use private health insurance to reimburse the cost of care obtained in the private sector."

=== Doctors of BC ===
In 2015, Day was temporarily announced as the president-elect for Doctors of BC, the provincial medical association in British Columbia, because of a win by a single vote difference. The election was then rescinded because of an error found in properly categorizing one ballot. Day then lost the subsequent run-off election in June 2015 to Alan Ruddiman by 603 votes after the publicity about the single-vote win escalated participation to the highest turnout by physician members of the association. In May 2016, Day was defeated 1,896 to 1,674 votes by Trina Larsen Soles in the election for the 2017–18 Doctors of BC presidency.

Day is the longest serving member of the editorial board for the BC Medical Journal.

== Advocacy for access to private care ==
In 2003, Maclean's Magazine named Day one its top 50 Canadians "to watch", describing him as "an iconoclast, whose time is now." He is referred to as "Dr. Profit" by opponents who believe his legal challenges will threaten Canada's publicly funded medicare system, and Prophet by supporters for his advocacy of a role for patient choice and the right to obtain private insurance in the face of long government wait lists for care.

Day has argued many Canadians are being hypocritical towards private healthcare, because 70 per cent of Canadians buy healthcare insurance. Many with such insurance themselves claim to oppose private healthcare, while embracing it for themselves. The other 30 per cent of Canadians who cannot afford the extra healthcare insurance receive poorer access to care.

Day cites the Canada Health Act of 1984 being responsible for rationing of care that has resulted in over a million Canadians suffering on wait lists, and to more than 5 million without a doctor. In the 2005 Chaoulli v Quebec (AG) decision, the Supreme Court of Canada struck down prohibitions on private insurance in that province because it was an infringement of the Quebec Charter of Human Rights and Freedoms; the decision did not extend to the rest of Canada, but constitutional experts opined that it would certainly have major impact on similar cases brought to court elsewhere. Day also supports the end of block funding for hospitals and a change to "Patient Focused Funding" where revenue follows the patient. He advocates a patient-centered system with a greater role for competition in Canadian healthcare as a means to reduce waiting times and save government money by treating people before their condition worsens. He is a frequent spokesman for the topic with news media and submits position papers with government. For instance, his submission to Roy Romanow's Commission on the Future of Health Care in Canada made 10 recommendations:

1. De-politicize the debate
2. Repeal the Canada Health Act
3. Eliminate global budgets and reward productivity
4. Incorporate business methods
5. Increase privatization and contracting out
6. Introduce competition, choice and accountability
7. Massively reduce bureaucracy
8. Reduce influence of public sector health unions
9. Accept economic reality, and introduce user fees
10. Rank "core services" and de-insure unnecessary services

=== US 'Conservatives For Patient Rights' commercial controversy ===
In May 2009, Day drew criticism after he was shown in a series of television ads for a US lobby group called Conservatives for Patients' Rights that opposed President Obama's health care reforms. Day appeared on the television program BNN on May 11, 2009, to clarify that he issued a letter distancing himself from the ad. He also pointed out that Obamacare was based on private insurance and private delivery, the opposite of what many Canadians believe in.

== Cambie Surgery Centre and Constitutional Legal Challenge ==
In 1995, Day founded Cambie Surgery Centre, a for-profit Vancouver clinic. Day is the facility's medical director, and one of its 40-plus shareholders. The Cambie Surgery Centre has 50 full- and part-time nurses and 125 doctors performing operations and other procedures for up to 5,000 patients a year, which may make it the busiest private hospital in Canada.

Day has said he decided to set up the Cambie Surgical Centre, which is non-union, after decreased government funding in the mid-90s cut his operating time at UBC from 17 hours a week to about six. The start-up was during the premiership of Michael Harcourt. To demolish an old nursing home and build a surgery centre on the site, Day needed to raise about $5 million. He succeeded in convincing notable Vancouverites such as the late Milan Ilich and Jack Poole, as well as Kip Woodward (chair of Providence Health Care and future chair of Vancouver Coastal Health), and 19 others including Jim Wyse and Hugh Magee, to commit $100,000 each with the remainder financed by the Royal Bank of Canada.

=== Cambie Surgeries Corporation v. British Columbia (Medical Services Commission) ===
In 2009, the Cambie Surgery Centre and patients filed a lawsuit versus the province's Medical Services Commission. Six of the eight plaintiffs were patients, two of whom died before the conclusion of the court case. The trial which took place from 2016 to 2020, included over a hundred witnesses.

In 2012, the British Columbia Medical Services Commission confirmed what the clinics had openly admitted to doing since 1996—namely allowing patients, in violation of the Medicare Protection Act, to spend their own funds to jump the queue and access the clinic.

The Commission asked the Cambie Surgery Centre not to permit patients access to earlier treatment. The plaintiffs pointed out the constitutional challenge had been brought before the courts 3 years earlier. In the Supreme Court of British Columbia, the plaintiffs challenged the prohibition on patients using their own funds to access care, instead of receiving it in order based on medical priority. Specifically, they are challenging the ban on private health insurance to cover medically necessary care, and the ban preventing doctors from working in both the public and private health systems at the same time.

Proponents of publicly funded healthcare in Canada argue that this legal challenge against medicare could set a dangerous precedent. Proponents of for-profit care argue the opposite and that patients will be protected from the dangers of waiting for care. In the Chaoulli decision (2005) the Supreme Court of Canada declared it was a fact that Canadians were suffering and dying on wait lists. It was expected that the case would, like the Chaoulli case, eventually be decided at the Supreme Court of Canada. A decision at this level would mean the outcome would be binding in all provinces and territories across the country. Some legal experts have described this case as one of the most significant legal challenges in Canadian history.

On September 10, 2020, Justice John J. Steeves of the Supreme Court of British Columbia (BCSC) handed down his 880-page decision, in which he found that the "impugned provisions do not deprive the right to life or liberty of the patient plaintiffs or similarly situated individuals." He said that there was a "rational connection between the effects of the impugned provisions and the objectives of preserving ... the universal health care system and ensuring access to necessary medical services is based on need and not the ability to pay." Justice Steeves ruled against legalizing private health insurance.

This decision was appealed to the BC Court of Appeal. On July 15, 2022, they dismissed the appeal. However, they cited many errors in the lower court’s findings and concluded: “Wait times in considerable measure flow from government rationing of health care” and “[the system] is intentionally under-designed in order to achieve fiscal sustainability.” They also found “that waiting inherently carries the risk of death.”

On April 6, 2023, despite having heard and overturned similar restrictions in the Chaoulli case, the Supreme Court of Canada refused leave to appeal without giving reasons.

In May 2025, Day’s book, My Fight for Canadian Healthcare: A Thirty-Year Battle to Put Patients First, was published by Sutherland books.

== Recognition ==
- 1993 to 2001: Associate editor, Journal of Arthroscopic Surgery
- 2001: 80th Annual Osler Lecturer, Vancouver Medical Association
- 2004: President, Arthroscopy Association of North America (AANA)
- 2004: Honorary Member, Cuban Orthopaedic Association
- 2004: Member, Board of Trustees, Journal of Arthroscopy
- 2005/06: President, Canadian Independent Medical Clinics Association (CIMCA)
- 2012: jointly listed as #38 in the Power50 list for influencers in sport in Canada by The Globe and Mail
- 2014: Doctors of BC Don Rix Leadership Award
- 2023: became the first orthopaedic surgeon to be inducted into the BC Sports Hall of Fame in recognition of his international role in the management of sports injuries
- 2023: awarded Fellow of the Royal College of Physicians of London, the specialist society for internal medicine in the UK and the oldest medical society in the world; a rare distinction for a surgeon
- 2025: received the King Charles III Coronation Medal, awarded by government to those "who have made a significant contribution to a particular province, territory or region... or attained an outstanding achievement abroad that brings credit to our country"
