= Conservatives for Patients' Rights =

American health care advocacy group

- Abbreviation: CPR
- Formation: February 2009
- Founder: Rick Scott
- Purpose: Health care pressure group
- Location: Washington D.C.
- Website: cprights.org

Conservatives for Patients' Rights (CPR) is a health care advocacy group founded by Rick Scott in February 2009 and most active in the lead up to the 2010 elections.

According to KFF Health News, Scott started the group with $5 million of his own money to "promote free-market health care reform solutions" and lobby against president Barack Obama's proposal for a government-run health care option.

Scott has stated that CPR has an intention of putting pressure on Democrats to enact health care legislation based on free-market principles.

CPR opposed the broad outlines of President Obama's health care reform plan, and hired Creative Response Concepts, a public relations firm, to produce advertising in support of this message.

== Campaign ==
Conservatives for Patients' Rights assert themselves as advocates for better health care. Their plan is described as the pillars of health care reform: "choice, competition, accountability and personal responsibility."

The CPR campaign for competition suggests a release of burdensome regulations against private companies in allowance of unfettered competition across the states. Scott said at that time of the CPR launch, "[When] the government gets involved, you run out of money and health care gets rationed." Scott has created and starred in a series of commercials advocating against greater government involvement in health care. CPR-affiliated citizens have protested at town hall meetings on the issue. CPR has provided a list of local town hall meetings discussing the issue, which the group urge their supporters to attend and have provided video footage on how previous people have handled the situation.

== Criticism ==
Some health policy analysts disagree with Scott, who called the Obama plan "socialized medicine."

In May 2009, the group Health Care for America Now (HCAN) started broadcasting an advertisement in the Washington, D.C. area and in Scott's home town of Naples, Florida, highlighting a fraud case in which Scott was indicted. HCAN said of Scott: "He and his insurance-company friends make millions from the broken system we have now.".

In August 2009, Katie Brickell and Kate Spall, two British woman who featured in a CPR commercial attacking the National Health Service, said they were "duped" and the commercial misrepresents them because in reality they strongly support state-funded health care. Both told The Times newspaper that they had been told they were being interviewed for a documentary examining healthcare reform, and neither knew the footage would be used for such a commercial.

The group was also criticized by economist Paul Krugman in a New York Times editorial.

Stephen Barrett, the webmaster of alternative medicine-critical website Quackwatch, has criticized the group for its television spots, which it considers "misleading" and "scare tactics", stating: "Together, they claim that current efforts at reform will (a) drive up taxes, (b) stop people from being able to choose their doctors, (c) cause many people to lose their current insurance coverage, and (d) take medical decision-making out of the hands of doctors. All of these messages are misleading". Barrett also questions Scott's trustworthiness for being entrusted with influence in healthcare system reform, as the latter was involved in the largest case of Medicare fraud and had run-ins with the Federal Trade Commission, who accused a hospital chain of which he was CEO of anti-competitive misconduct, and he also invested in a producer of food supplements which Barrett states implies in its advertisement that its products can cure various diseases when such promotion is in fact illegal according to Federal law.

== See also ==
- Free-market health care
- Single-payer health care
- Universal health care
