= Cambie Surgeries Corporation v British Columbia =

2020 high-profile Supreme Court of British Columbia case

Cambie Surgeries Corporation v British Columbia (Attorney General)
- Court: Supreme Court of British Columbia (BCSC)
- Started: September 6, 2016
- Decided: September 10, 2020
- Citation: 2020 BCSC 1310
- Transcript: Judgement

Case opinions
- Decision by: Justice John J. Steeves

Cambie Surgeries Corporation v British Columbia [2020 BCSC 1310] was a high-profile, multi-year Supreme Court of British Columbia (BCSC) case brought by Brian Day, an advocate for private healthcare, against the province of British Columbia. Day, who runs the Vancouver-based private clinic Cambie Surgery Centre, challenged the sections of the province's Medicare Protection Act (MPA) that prevent private practitioners from charging patients who are enrolled in Canada's universal healthcare system for services available in that system. The lawsuit stated that the MPA was unconstitutional because it violated sections 7 ("right to life") and 15 ("equal protection") of the Canadian Charter of Rights and Freedoms.

Supporters of the lawsuit decried what they saw as a dangerous mandate that contributed to a problem of long waits for public care without consideration for urgency. The defendants' advocates argued that the lawsuit did not rise to the level of a constitutional question and that a ruling in plaintiffs' favour would do long-lasting damage to Canada's public healthcare system that would far outweigh the problems it purported to solve. Both sides stated publicly that the outcome of the case would have an enduring effect on the country's healthcare. The trial started in 2016 and was finally decided on September 10, 2020. In an 880-page decision, Justice John J. Steeves of the BCSC dismissed the plaintiffs' claims. The plaintiffs filed a notice of appeal and in July 2022, the B.C. Court of Appeal upheld Justice Steeves' decision. The Supreme Court of Canada declined to hear an appeal from the judgment of the British Columbia Court of Appeal.

== Plaintiffs ==
Brian Day, a "private health-care advocate", who founded and serves as the medical director of the private clinic Cambie Surgery Centre and Specialist Referral Clinic in Vancouver, British Columbia, was the spokesman for the high-profile case, sometimes called 'The Day Case'.

The plaintiffs argued that British Columbia's Medicare Protection Act (MPA) violated the Canadian Charter of Rights and Freedoms, because it forbids private providers from directly charging patients enrolled in the public system for any service that can be accessed in that system and does not permit exceptions for urgency. They emphasized section 7, which protects the "right to life, liberty and security of the person" and section 15, which guarantees "equality rights". The lawsuit claimed that this rule can cause people to "suffer prolonged pain and disability, serious psychological harm or deterioration and irreparable harm" that could have been prevented.

== Defendants and intervenors ==
The lawsuit named as defendants the Attorney General of British Columbia, the Attorney General of Canada, and two groups of intervenors who opposed the plaintiffs' claim. These groups, named by Steeves as "Patient Intervenors" and "Coalition Intervenors," were, respectively, a four-person group of non-expert citizens who said they "experienced harm while being treated by physicians engaging in dual practice and extra billing" and a four-person group made up of two low-income citizens whose medical needs are covered by the public system and two physicians who represented two advocacy groups that promote the preservation of universal healthcare in Canada.

== Trial and decision ==
The trial is known for its unusual length and complexity; it lasted just over four years and had participation from more than one hundred witnesses. It ended on September 10, 2020 when presiding justice John J. Steeves, a judge on the Supreme Court of British Columbia, issued an 880-page ruling in favour of the defendants. Steeves found that the plaintiffs' complaints did not show violations of sections 7 and 15 of the Canadian Charter and that the amount of suffering the plaintiffs claimed to endure did not outweigh the deleterious effects a ruling in their favour would have on the country's universal healthcare system.

Day and the plaintiffs filed a notice of appeal in early 2021 and on July 15, 2022, the B.C. Court of Appeal upheld B.C. Supreme Court Justice John Steeves' decision that despite long waits in the public health system, there is no constitutional right to access to private health.

== Appeal ==
A week before he issued his decision, Steeves predicted that no matter the outcome, inevitable appeals would mean the Supreme Court of Canada would make the case's final ruling. Immediately after Steeves handed down his ruling, Brian Day pledged to appeal it.

On appeal to the British Columbia Court of Appeal, the three-judge panel ruled that the appeal be dismissed without costs but there were two opinions with different rationales. Chief Justice Bauman and Justice Harris found that the impugned provisions of the Medicare Protection Act deprive some patients of the right to life and right to security of the person, but in accordance with the principles of fundamental justice. Therefore (according to the majority of the panel), the impugned provisions do not infringe section 7 of the Canadian Charter of Rights and Freedoms. The third member of the panel, Justice Fenlon, held that the impugned legislative provisions deprive some patients of the right to life and security of the person, and are not in accordance with the principles of fundamental justice. Therefore, according to Justice Fenlon, the provisions infringe section 7 of the Charter. However, Justice Fenlon went on to find the provisions are saved by section 1 of the Canadian Charter of Rights and Freedoms, and therefore are not unconstitutional.

The Supreme Court of Canada declined to hear the case, dismissing the application for leave to appeal made by Cambie Surgeries Corporation.

== See also ==
- Chaoulli v Quebec (AG)
