= Free-market healthcare =

Healthcare market not controlled by government

In a system of free-market healthcare, prices for healthcare products and services are set freely by agreement between patients and health care providers, which are subject to the laws and forces of supply and demand and free from any intervention by a government, price-setting monopoly, or other outside authority. A free market contrasts with a controlled market, in which government intervenes in supply and demand through non-market methods such as regulations and laws by creating barriers or incentives to market entry or through directly setting prices.

Advocates of free-market healthcare contend that systems like single-payer healthcare and publicly funded healthcare holistically results in higher costs, inefficiency, lower quality healthcare, longer waiting times for care, denial of care to some, and administrative mismanagement. Opponents argue that healthcare as an unregulated commodity invokes market failures not present with government regulation, and that selling healthcare as a commodity leads to both unfair and inefficient systems, with poorer individuals being unable to afford preventive care.
