= Birss =

Birss is a surname. Notable people with the surname include:

- Colin Birss (born 1964), British judge
- Shane Birss (born 1983), Australian rules football player
- Viola Birss, Canadian professor of chemistry

== See also ==
- Burse, surname
