= University of Calgary Students' Union =

Canadian student organization

Students' Union, University of Calgary
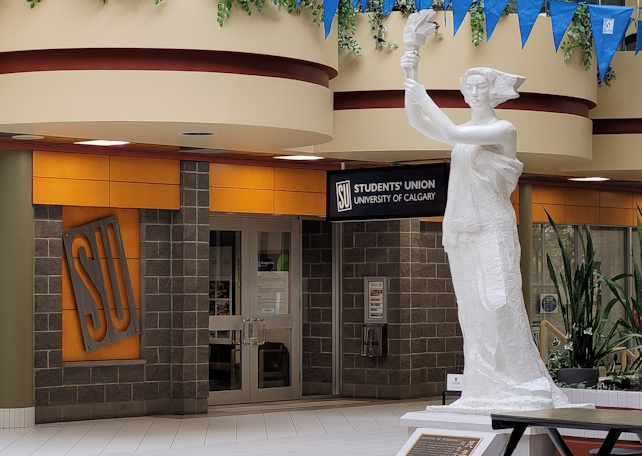
- Students' Union offices (2025)
- Institution: University of Calgary
- Location: Calgary, Alberta
- President: Naomie Bakana
- Originated: 1910s
- Incorporated: 1966
- Website: su.ucalgary

The Students’ Union, University of Calgary (commonly abbreviated to UCSU) is the undergraduate students’ association of the University of Calgary. With origins in the students’ council of the Calgary Normal School, the UCSU was established in its current incarnation by the Universities Act of 1966, which incorporated the University of Calgary as a separate entity from the University of Alberta.

A non-profit organization with an annual budget of $12 million CAD, the UCSU is led by students who are elected democratically by the undergraduate student body to serve one-year terms. The UCSU provides student services, manages on-campus businesses, and conducts student-focused advocacy before various tiers of government and external bodies.

== History ==
=== 1905-1944: Calgary Normal School ===
Once Alberta became a province in 1905, its Legislative Assembly decided that Calgary would house Alberta’s first teacher training institute, the Calgary Normal School. Early student government at the school consisted of two committees, the Literary and Athletic Executives, composed of students elected to represent their peers in academic and extracurricular matters. By the 1920s, student representation was performed by one consolidated student council. Students elected representatives for their individual classes, as well as a president, vice-president, secretary, treasurer, and an official school pianist. Elections occurred twice each academic year, one in fall and one in spring, owing to the duration of courses at the school.

=== 1945-1947: Becoming an undergraduate association ===
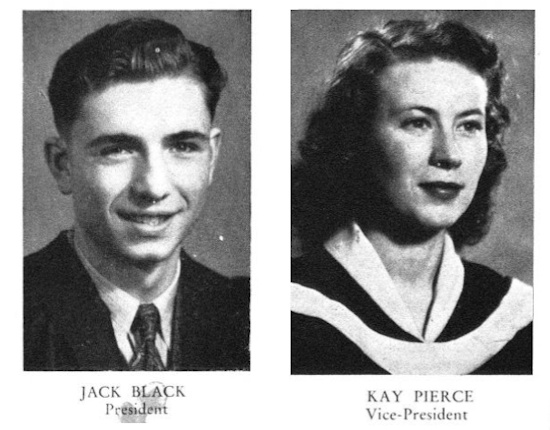
Yearbook photographs of John "Jack" Black, first president of the Calgary Students' Union (left) and Catherine "Kay" Pierce (right), vice-president of the University of Alberta's Students' Union (1945).

In 1945, all three Normal Schools in Alberta were absorbed by the University of Alberta’s Faculty of Education. The Calgary school became formally known as its Faculty of Education in Calgary, and informally known as the Calgary Branch. Although the Students’ Union of the University of Alberta (UASU) initially assumed it would take on the duty of providing student representation at the Calgary Branch, students in Calgary protested against surrendering their own student council and paying the UASU's association fees. Such was the Branch’s desire to retain control over its activities and yearbook that the UASU sent one of its Vice-Presidents, Catherine Pierce, from Edmonton to Calgary in November 1945. She negotiated with the council under John “Jack” Black, president of the Calgary Branch’s student council for its fall 1945 term.

A compromise was struck between UASU and Black’s administration. UASU refunded half of the fees paid by the Calgary students and the Calgary Branch retained its own Calgary Students' Union (CSU), though its governing council would have to operate within the bounds of UASU’s constitution. Furthermore, the Calgary campus would again publish an independent edition of its yearbook. As Black’s term marked a change in the purpose of student governance from providing for trainee teachers to providing for undergraduates, the modern-day Students’ Union considers Black to be its first President.

The practice of electing a council twice a year persisted from Normal School tradition until 1947. Afterwards, students elected to the CSU’s council served one-year terms. The CSU’s council also changed its structure to align with UASU’s constitution. The top four positions of its governing council were now President, Vice-President, Treasurer, and Secretary. The rest of the council consisted of the yearbook’s editor, a social convener, representatives for the Industrial Arts programs offered by the branch, and Literary and Athletic representatives. The Calgary Branch also imported the controversial Wauneita Society from the UASU, a quasi-sorority women’s interest group. This society selected its own president, who received a de facto seat on the Calgary Students’ Council.

The council’s role evolved into chiefly overseeing the financial side of planning and maintaining student events or amenities. It therefore established subcommittees in 1948 to execute plans and policies. One such subcommittee was the University Athletic Board, which provided practical support such as equipment repairs to sports teams. The council delegated professional development activities to the Educational Undergraduate Society. Some campus clubs endured from the Normal School, and some new ones began. There were clubs for students interested in theatre, choir, debate, philosophy, and religion. Physical activities students could participate in included ping pong, basketball, bowling, hockey, cheerleading, and folk dancing. A club for veterans of the Second World War opened for staff and student alike. The CSU also oversaw the introduction of a campus newspaper.

=== 1948-1957: Initial steps towards autonomy ===
Dr. Andrew Doucette became the Calgary Branch's director in 1947. An engineering graduate from Nova Scotia, he had entered teaching and worked at the Calgary Normal School before enlisting in the Canadian Armed Forces in 1940. Having attained the rank of Major, he had recently returned from serving in Europe at the time of his appointment as director. That year also saw Frederick Cartwright elected president of the students' council. Cartwright, the son of two deaf parents, would go on to become Superintendent of the Alberta School for the Deaf. Doucette and Cartwright would work towards securing greater autonomy for the branch.

In the summer of 1948, Cartwright’s administration requested that changes be made to the UASU’s constitution, so that the Calgary branch could have its own Committee on Student Affairs. This Edmonton-based committee, made of delegates from the UASU and University of Alberta leadership, supervised matters of student discipline and welfare across all of the university's campuses. Despite the rocky start in 1945, relations between the CSU and UASU were good enough that the UASU supported the proposal, and the university's board of governors ratified the changes in 1949. Thus, in an early step towards self-governance, the Calgary Branch established its own student affairs committee.

In the winter of 1948, Doucette met with the Calgary University Committee, a pressure group of Calgarians who wanted to see an autonomous university in their city. Doucette encouraged them by sharing what he believed the branch would need in order to introduce university-level Arts and Science programs, which would expand the Branch from being a single Faculty of Education.

Following these developments, Doucette and Cartwright travelled to the University of Alberta's main campus together in early 1949 to report on the Branch’s progress. A University of Calgary institutional report would later reflect on Doucette and Cartwright’s work as having impressed authorities in Edmonton enough that they began giving serious consideration to calls by Calgary community activists for the city’s Branch to house multiple Faculties. Indeed, between 1952 and 1957, the Calgary Branch expanded to offer undergraduate programs in Arts, Science, Engineering, and Physical Education. Having become a university branch rather than a single faculty of education, the school was renamed to the University of Alberta in Calgary (UAC) in 1957.

=== 1958-1966: Attaining autonomy ===
In 1958, the provincial government found that the UAC had outgrown the building it shared with the Provincial Institute of Technology and Art and ordered construction of a new campus. UAC moved to this campus, the present-day site of the University of Calgary, in 1960. The CSU occupied the basement of the Arts building, accompanied by offices for the yearbook, campus newspaper, and a bookstore. The construction of an independent campus was the realization of a dream for Andrew Doucette, who was now facing ill health. Forced to scale back his duties, he was disappointed that he could not serve as the branch’s first president at its new location, though he remained with the institution until 1961 to acclimate incoming president Malcolm Taylor. The CSU dedicated the first edition of the yearbook published on the new campus to Doucette.

A Committee on Student Affairs was also established for the Calgary campus that year. Walter Johns, President of the University of Alberta, described the student body as “increasingly competent and responsible” at managing their own affairs. Indeed, the composition of the Calgary Students’ Union’s governing council evolved to represent the various faculties now on campus. Students continued to elect a President, Vice-President, Secretary, and Treasurer, though they now voted for Faculty Representatives for Engineering, Commerce, and Education; Arts and Science students were represented by one Faculty Representative. Other positions included coordinators responsible for overseeing cultural matters, athletics, women’s affairs, and public relations. Finally, students elected a representative of the Calgary campus for the National Federation of Canadian University Students.

Although the appetite for an independent university remained, the CSU did not actively pursue the matter until October 1963, when Walter Johns declared that an autonomous University of Calgary would be “useless and uncalled for.” This made the front page of the Calgary Herald, as Johns' statement attracted the ire of students and staff alike at the Calgary campus. The CSU held a referendum on November 22, 1963, asking students to vote on whether they wished for the Calgary branch to achieve “complete academic and administrative autonomy” from the University of Alberta; 78.5% voted yes. Johns, in turn, blamed the conduct of Calgarians for causing “bitterness and bad feeling on both sides which should not have occurred.”

Rising tension between Calgary and Edmonton spooked some student councillors, who feared the University of Alberta would retaliate by withholding their degrees. The CSU nonetheless continued supporting independence efforts in 1964, selling stickers and badges emblazoned with slogans in favour of autonomy to fund its work. By one account, these made their way on to Johns’ car in Edmonton.

The University of Alberta’s Board of Governors ultimately responded by granting the Calgary branch two independent governance bodies in late 1964. The branch would receive its own General Faculties Council, responsible for academic affairs and the supervision of student affairs; and its own Senate, responsible for external relations. This was still insufficient to pacify the Calgary University Committee, which petitioned the province to revisit the idea of granting the Calgary campus independence.

The University of Alberta subsequently recommended a full separation between both institutions, prompting the Government of Alberta to introduce a bill to that end in 1966. On April 15, 1966, royal assent was given to the Universities Act. The University of Calgary became an independent institution, and the Students’ Union, University of Calgary was incorporated as its official undergraduate representative.

== Finances ==
The UCSU derives 10% of its operating revenue from student fees and 90% from its own commercial activity. This allows UCSU to charge one of the lowest students’ association fees in Canada as of 2019, at $65 per academic year for an average full-time undergraduate. The UCSU has traditionally put any and all fee increases to a vote, even when continuing to offer services without an increase would mean operating at a loss, such as the referendum on increasing its Health and Dental Plan in 2022. As such, the UCSU’s core operating student fee has not increased since 1995. Annual financial audits are available on its website.

== MacEwan Hall ==
The UCSU's base of operations is MacEwan Hall, located on the University of Calgary's main campus. The building consists of the original Hall, which opened in 1967, and the MacEwan Student Centre, an extension that opened in 1988. Colloquially, the building is known on campus and in Calgary as 'Mac Hall.' Two UCSU subsidiaries manage concert bookings and events using spaces within the Hall: the MacEwan Conference and Event Centre, and Mac Hall Concerts.

=== History of MacEwan Hall: 1951-1967 ===
Until 1960, the Calgary Branch shared a campus with the Provincial Institute of Technology and Arts (PITA), precursor to the Southern Alberta Institute of Technology (SAIT) and Alberta University of the Arts. The building PITA shared with the Calgary Branch remains in use today as SAIT's Heritage Hall. Initially, the CSU operated out of one room and shared this space with student clubs, whose members often left furniture owned by the CSU strewn across campus. Andrew Doucette sympathized with the shortage of space for student activities, so in 1951, once the Branch received its own Committee on Student Affairs, began working with the CSU to find a more appropriate space for its operations.

On the grounds was a hut that had been used by army medics during the war. Doucette secured permission from the University of Alberta to turn the building over to the CSU. Students renovated and furnished the hut themselves, except for a rug gifted by Doucette. The building housed offices for the campus newspaper, clubs, councillors, and the yearbook team. It also contained meeting chambers and a games room. During the building’s lifetime, students continued to conduct its maintenance.

In 1962, the CSU asked students to vote on whether they would accept a temporary $10 increase to their association fee in order to fundraise for the construction of a new building. The referendum passed with 94% of the vote and work began on construction. Student contributions paid for 55% of the costs; the University of Calgary's Board of Governors paid the remaining 45%. The Hall was named after Grant MacEwan, then-Lieutenant-Governor of Alberta, who attended its 1967 opening. With services ranging from office space to dining facilities, it was managed by a committee of five university delegates and six UCSU delegates.

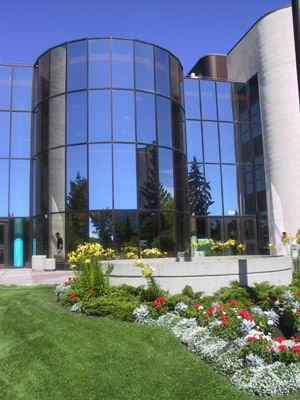
MacEwan Student Centre

=== History of MacEwan Student Centre: 1967-1988 ===
By 1980, enrolment at the university had broadly increased year on year to the point that MacEwan Hall was no longer large enough to accommodate them. Students were again asked by the UCSU if they would pay a temporary building fee, this time to facilitate an expansion of MacEwan Hall; the referendum passed. The Government of Alberta, which at the time was part-funding several other developments on the university's campus in anticipation of the 1988 Winter Olympics in Calgary, contributed funding to the Centre's development.

Successive UCSU Presidents oversaw construction of the expansion, MacEwan Student Centre, including Myles McDougall. McDougall, who later became Alberta's Minister for Advanced Education in 2025, participated in the groundbreaking ceremony when construction began in 1985. The expansion opened in 1988, adding 16,500 square metres of space to MacEwan Hall. It contained facilities such as a counselling clinic, a health centre, study spaces, club spaces, Native Student Services, the campus bookstore, and a ten-outlet food court.

=== Notable performances and events ===
The first act to perform at MacEwan Hall was Ian & Sylvia on October 13, 1967. Rock band The Tragically Hip performed at the MacEwan Ballroom in 1989 and used footage from the show in the music video for their single, New Orleans Is Sinking. In October 1995, Edmontonian punk band Jr. Gone Wild played their final show at the Ballroom before disbanding for over a decade.

== Services and programming ==
=== Student financial assistance ===
==== Awards and bursaries ====
The UCSU’s first scholarship was established in 1969, after incoming university president Alfred Carrothers declined a monetary welcome gift from the UCSU and instead asked that the money be put to good use. The UCSU established the A.W.R. Carrothers Scholarship, which it continues to offer annually. The UCSU’s second ongoing financial award, the Ray Alward Memorial Bursary, began a decade later, in honour of MacEwan Hall's long-serving caretaker who was popular among students.

As of 2025, the UCSU offers a range of merit-based and needs-based scholarships and bursaries for the University of Calgary’s undergraduates. Students can also apply for funding to support their academic and professional development. These funds include conference and research funding, as well as employment subsidies and funding to support student-led sustainability efforts.

==== Volunteer tax clinic ====
The SU oversees an annual tax filing clinic, staff by student volunteers who are trained to Canada Revenue Agency standards. Low-income members of the campus' community, including students, staff and faculty, may take advantage of free tax filing services. The clinic, first established in 2000, generally files over 1,000 returns annually.

=== Health services ===
==== Health plan ====
The UCSU administers a health and dental plan for undergraduates. Health insurance was first introduced in the 1988-89 academic year by the 46th Students’ Legislative Council, and dental coverage was added in 1991. The cost of these plans combined did not increase between 1993 and 2021. Students were asked to vote on whether they would accept an increase to the cost of their health plan in 2022 in order to increase coverage; the majority voted no. As of 2022, the UCSU’s student health and dental plan remains one of the cheapest in Canada.

==== On-campus health ====
The UCSU began exploring ways to introduce on-campus mental health provision for students on campus in 1970. Financial constraints limited these early efforts to the funding of a counselling hotline, the Crisis Centre. The hotline was primarily staffed by volunteers, and fielded inquiries from students seeking help on various issues, ranging from loneliness to academic stress.

In 2008, the UCSU funded the development of the SU Wellness Centre to provide health services on-campus. Located within the UCSU’s building, this Centre is staffed by medical and mental health professionals who provide care to the university’s community. In 2016, provincial funding facilitated the hiring of more social workers and psychologists at the Centre to meet growing demand for mental health support.

=== Quality Money ===
In 2003, the UCSU proposed that the university should reinvest a percentage of tuition revenue into projects designed to improve campus amenities and academic offerings. The university agreed, and, since 2004, the UCSU has received a funding allocation of between $1.4 and $1.6 million for disbursement under the Quality Money initiative. A committee of students, elected and voluntary, reviews project proposals and decides which applications should be funded. Projects may span multiple years, such as the introduction of free menstrual products to MacEwan Hall that began in 2021 to run for at least three years.

=== SU Campus Food Bank ===
The UCSU can trace its history of participating in charitable efforts to combat food insecurity to its early incarnation under the Calgary Normal School. The Students’ Council organized winter fundraising galas for the benefit of the Sunshine Society, a philanthropic arm of the Calgary Herald that provided necessities to low-income families in the city.

In 1993, a student club, the Students’ Food Action Committee, began raising awareness of the issue of food insecurity on campus. The UCSU coordinated a partnership with the Calgary Interfaith Food Bank, thus maintaining its own food bank for the first time. In its first year, the bank was utilized by 170 students and their relatives, including 60 children. In 1996, the UCSU began managing the food bank independently, which it continues to operate as of May 2025.

Between 2021 and 2024, the SU Campus Food Bank entered a period of rising demand. The UCSU completed 227 requests for food hampers in the academic year of 2021-22, and 526 for the academic year of 2022-23. In August 2024, the UCSU reported that usage for the 2024-25 academic year was on track to surpass previous records. Also in late 2024, the UCSU began offering an affordable meal program through its on-campus restaurant, The Den, in a bid to address food insecurity on campus.

Every October, the SU Campus Food Bank runs an annual food drive in partnership with the university. Students and faculty alike are encouraged to form teams and compete to collect the most donations. These events are generally themed, such as the 2022 drive entitled ‘Stack the Mac.’ Participants were tasked with collecting enough non-perishable pasta that the UCSU could build a tower taller than the university's mascot, Rex. The SU Campus Food Bank’s operations are also supported by year-round donations.

=== LGBT+ programming ===
==== Early initiatives ====
February 1969 saw the UCSU invite Harold Call, American LGBT rights activist and U.S. army veteran, to give a talk at MacEwan Hall. This was four months before same-sex sexual activity was decriminalized in Canada. Call’s talk focused on the negative experiences of the LGBT community during interactions with North American police. Three plainclothes undercover officers from the Calgary Police were in attendance at the talk; they left when Call identified them as police officers from the podium.

==== Q Centre ====
The SU Q Centre is a centre offering peer support services, events, and space to socialize for students who are members or allies of the LGBT+ community. Primarily staffed by volunteers, the Q Centre opened on November 3, 2010. Within a decade of its opening, the Centre had expanded from 10 volunteers to 40.

==== Other initiatives ====
Every August since 2012, the UCSU participates in Calgary Pride. In 2021, the Q Centre and wider UCSU campaigned to simplify the process for students who legally change their names to update their records with the University of Calgary. Students also received the option to submit a preferred name.

=== Academic and campus services ===
The UCSU has connected students in need of academic assistance with tutors since 2012 via the SU Tutor Registry. The UCSU also manages over 6,000 lockers throughout the institution, maintains a guide to study spaces across the university, and operates the only Lost and Found on campus.

=== Philanthropic ventures ===
==== Refugee Student Program ====
In March 1986, students voted in favour of establishing a small levy to support the enrollment of at least one refugee student every year at the university. In partnership with the World University Service of Canada, students supported by the program include survivors of the Second Sudanese Civil War and students from refugee camps in Malawi and Kenya. 97% of students supported by the program go on to graduate.

==== The Committee of 10,000 ====
Each year, the UCSU collects a small levy from undergraduates for the benefit of the Committee of 10,000. This committee, composed of student volunteers, accepts applications from charitable causes in Calgary and Alberta, and decides which should receive the funds raised from the student body. The UCSU’s primary permanent off-campus charitable effort, it was founded in honour of Olga Valda, who had been both a student and benefactor of the University of Calgary.

Valda, a ballerina by profession, arrived in Canada in 1919 and moved with her second husband to Calgary in 1950, where she established the Calgary Ballet School. In 1961, aged 69, Valda enrolled at the University of Calgary to pursue a bachelor's degree in archeology. She quickly established a warm relationship with the UCSU, founding a Ballet Club that also conducted showcases of Russian folk dancing during her first year on campus. The UCSU presented Valda with an award in 1963 for her contributions to campus life and deemed her to be one of the campus’s “most celebrated” students in 1966. In a profile of Valda’s academic life for the Calgary Herald, Grant MacEwan wrote that she was the oldest graduate in Canada at the time of her graduation in 1969.

Valda maintained a relationship with the university until her death in 1973. She bequeathed a portion of her estate to the University of Calgary to provide bursaries for students who needed it. This bursary, which the university named after her, ran until 2005. The UCSU decided to honour Valda as well by establishing the “Committee of 10,000,” so named due to the number of students enrolled at the time of its 1973 founding.

== Student clubs ==
Student clubs may sign up with the UCSU to become an SU Registered Club, which entitles them to access services provided by the students' association, including free event spaces and activities funding. As of 2024, there are more than 300 SU Registered Clubs active at the university. In the 21st century, organizations that have registered with the SU include clubs for aquaponics and improvisational comedy.

Notable clubs that have been registered with the UCSU include the Conservative Party of Canada club, of which Pierre Poilievre was a member during his time as a student at the University of Calgary. Otafest, an annual anime convention that has taken place in Calgary since 1999, began as a student club.

=== Early student clubs: 1911-1945 ===
The student government of the Calgary Normal School, the respective predecessors to the UCSU and University of Calgary, initially consisted of two committees that were responsible for arranging extracurricular activities. The first was the Literary Executive, which organized weekly assemblies known as the ‘Friday Lit.’ Each class was invited to put on a short dramatic performance for the enjoyment of the student body. Most were student-run, though staff would sometimes be enlisted to help if a class wished to perform a musical. The second student committee was the Athletic Executive, tasked with organizing sporting events for their fellow students. Representatives were each responsible for a sport, with early portfolios including lawn tennis, baseball, and hockey.

== Events ==
The UCSU hosts a series of regular events for the benefit of campus life. It has also hosted events that have been discontinued.

=== Ongoing events ===
==== Teaching Excellence Awards (1983-) ====
The UCSU began distributing awards for outstanding performances by University of Calgary instructors in the 1976-77 academic year. This initiative was introduced by Patricia Ruby, the first woman to be elected president of the post-1945 UCSU. These awards were formalized into the Teaching Excellence Awards in the 1983-84 year.

Every fall, the UCSU invites students to nominate instructors and teaching assistants at the University of Calgary that have positively impacted their education and experience. Winners are awarded at a presentation ceremony in April. Notable winners include writer Aritha Van Herk and electrochemical scientist Viola Birss.

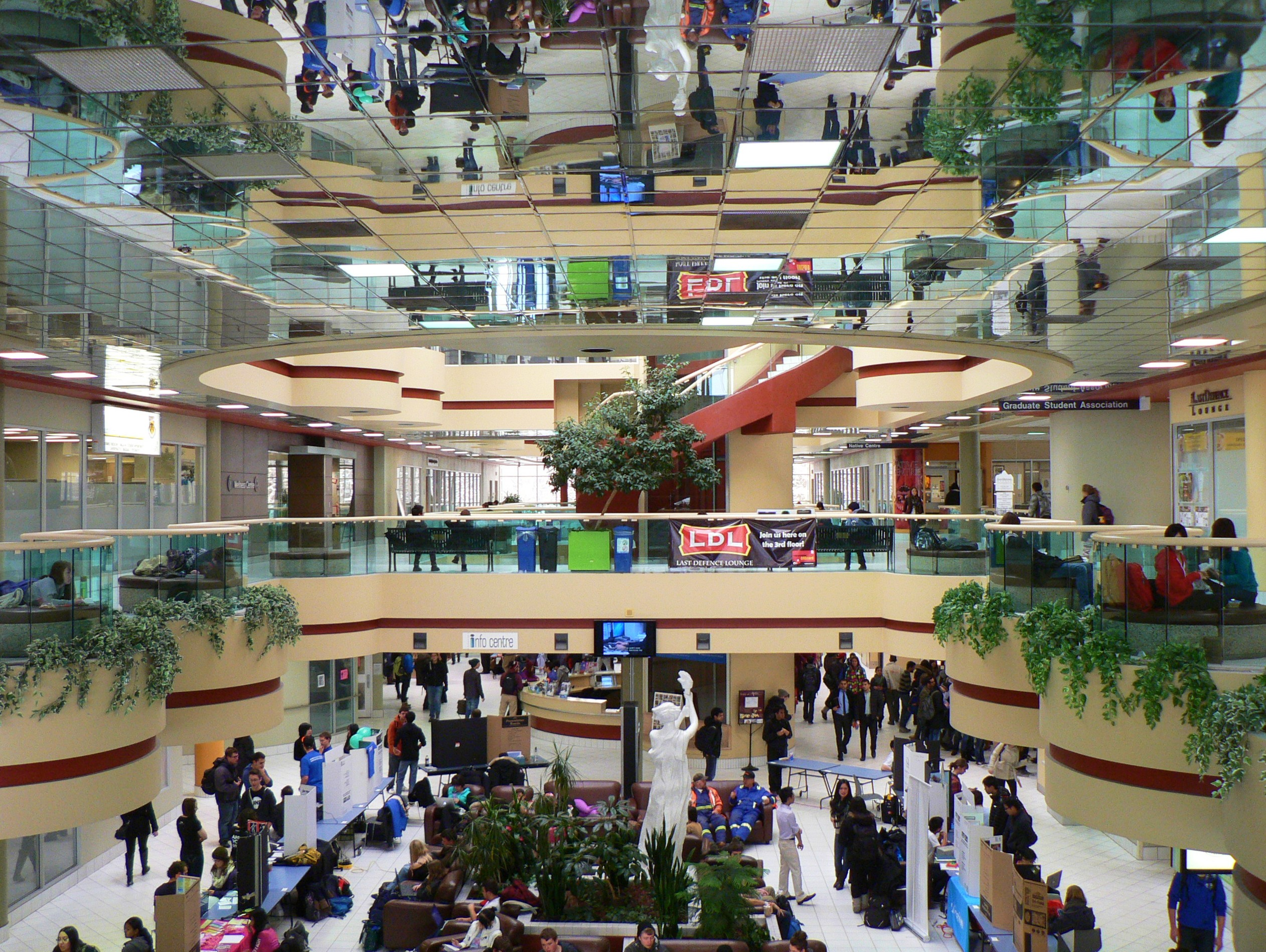
Clubs Week in MacEwan Hall, 2013.

==== Clubs Week (1993-) ====
Once every semester, student clubs are invited to set up displays in MacEwan Hall to showcase their club's activities and recruit new members.

===== Undergraduate Research Symposium (2009-) =====
Since 2006, the annual SU Undergraduate Research Symposium has celebrated research by the university's undergraduates. Students who have participated in research while enrolled at the institution showcase their work and receive awards.

==== Sex Week (2012-) ====
In 2012, the UCSU and its Q Centre first partnered with the Women’s Resource Centre and campus Wellness Centre to host Sex Week, which has been held every year since. The occasion features workshops and events intended to further sexual education, and make students aware of resources available to them for matters such as sexual assault or sexual identity.

==== StressLess Week (2013-) ====
In the final week of November, the UCSU hosts a series of activities designed to help students alleviate stress ahead of exams in December.

=== Discontinued events ===
==== Bermuda Shorts Day (1961-2023) ====
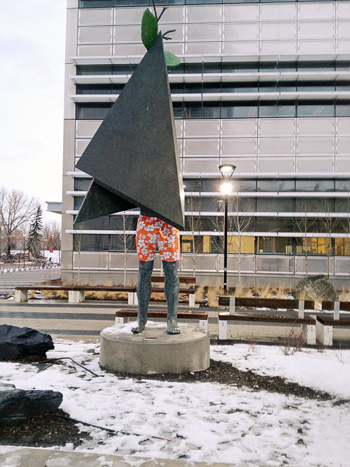
A statue outside the University's Energy Environment and Experiential Learning Building is vandalized with a pair of Bermuda shorts (April 2015).

In 1961, a student named Alan Arthur, who had recently purchased his first pair of Bermuda shorts, wrote on a blackboard ahead of the last day of classes: "Tomorrow is Bermuda Shorts Day. Everyone wear Bermuda Shorts." 250 students participated, assembling to play marbles. (Although the event is occasionally attributed to Maurice Yacowar, the first editor of The Gauntlet and later SU President, Yacowar confirmed that Arthur was the event's unwitting founder in 2005.)

Students subsequently made an annual tradition of wearing shorts on the last day of classes. The UCSU began organizing events including live music and beer gardens in 1979, though it would not become the primary organizer until 1989, when the university asked the students' council to consolidate festivities. The event attracted recognition by Canadian media as a local tradition, and criticism for unsafe or disorderly activities. Events that took place outside the UCSU's control were occasionally disbursed by the police, with one notable example occurring in 2010, when students celebrated by racing modified couches that they pushed down a hill.

An off-campus Bermuda Shorts Day party was the location of the 2014 Calgary stabbings. One of the attack's victims, Lawrence Hong, was an urban studies undergraduate who had volunteered at the SU's Q Centre for three years, where he was a popular mentor to other students. The Q Centre held a vigil in Hong's memory.

In its final few years of operation as an SU event, Bermuda Shorts Day ran at a deficit. By 2019, the UCSU reported that it had incurred a loss of over $98,000. In 2018 and 2019, the UCSU attributed the expense to falling attendance numbers, exacerbated by the university's expectation that the UCSU would bear rising security costs for the event. The university contended in 2016 that it did not expect the UCSU to cover all security expenses, but did not dispute that it had begun charging the UCSU nearly $100,000 a year by 2017. The most recent UCSU-organized Bermuda Shorts Day occurred in 2023. By 2024, the UCSU was no longer able to pay the university's rising costs, and events were reported as having been driven off-campus.

== Students' Legislative Council ==
The UCSU's highest governing body is the Students' Legislative Council, where all resolutions, major policies, and positions are voted on. All undergraduates enrolled at the university are eligible to participate in the council's yearly general election.

The council consists of four executives, who work in their positions full-time, and at least twelve faculty representatives from the University of Calgary's various academic Faculties. Each faculty may elect an additional representative for every additional 2,000 students enrolled. Undergraduates also elect two representatives to the University of Calgary's Senate, and one representative to the university's board of governors.

== 2025-26 Students' Legislative Council ==
Role	Office
President	Naomie Bakana
Vice President Academic	Gabriela Dziegielewska
Vice President External	Julia Law
Vice President Internal	Lorraine Ndovi
Faculty of Arts Representatives	Malia Jolly, Simchah Atanda, Mahad Rzain, Aitazaz Shah
Faculty of Science Representatives	Haris Naveed, Abdu Negmeldin, Emil Rasmussen
Haskayne School of Business Representatives	Joey Szasz, Griffin Stewart
Schulich School of Engineering Representatives	Ibad Rehman, Emmanuel Fasesan, Wania Nabi
Werklund School of Education Representative	Siena Yee
Faculty of Kinesiology Representative	Amanat Panech
Faculty of Law Representative	Faisal Baghazal
Cumming School of Medicine Representatives	Nikhil Srivalsan, Hannah Kim
Faculty of Nursing Representative	Taylor Strelow
Faculty of Social Work Representative	Jenna Purna
Faculty of Veterinary Medicine Representative	Stephanie Cheung
Faculty of the School of Architecture, Planning, and Landscape	Matthew Moreau

Non-Voting Officials

Role	Office
Board of Governors	Lujaina Eldelebshany
Senate	Laiba Nasir, Amber Quo
Speaker of the Legislative Council	
Deputy Speaker

== Provincial and federal representation ==
The UCSU is a member of the Canadian Alliance of Students Associations, a federal advocacy organization that unites students' associations throughout Canada. Previously, the organization belonged to provincial advocacy organization Council of Alberta University Students.

== Notable former student leaders ==
=== Former presidents and vice-presidents ===
- Jim Hawkes: (1953-54); Member of Parliament for Calgary West from 1979 until 1993.
- Paul Unongo: (1963-64); the first international student to become President of the UCSU, Unongo went on to become a federal minister in his native Nigeria.
- Stella Thompson (née Margery Lee): Vice President (1965-66); Alberta Order of Excellence recipient and one of the first women to become an executive in the province's energy industry.
- John Zaozirny: Vice-President (1967-68); Member of the Legislative Assembly of Alberta between 1979 and 1986, where he served as Minister of Energy from 1982 to 1986.
- Douglas R. Mah (1977-78); appointed Justice of the Court of King's Bench of Alberta in 2016.
- Tag Goulet: (1980-81); author, publisher, and film producer. Goulet, the first Indigenous person to lead the UCSU, is Canadian Metis, and has worked in advocacy roles for the Indigenous community.
- Myles McDougall: (1984-85); Member of the Legislative Assembly of Alberta for Calgary-Fish Creek and current Albertan Minister of Advanced Education.
- Nima Dorjee: (1989-90); engineer and entrepreneur. Dorjee, himself born into a Tibetan refugee family, was appointed a Member of the Order of Canada in 2024 for his work in refugee resettlement and mentoring aspiring engineers.
- Naheed Nenshi: (1993-94); thrice-elected mayor of Calgary, current leader of the Alberta New Democratic Party.
- Lauren Webber: (2010-11); daughter of former Member of Parliament, Len Webber, and one recipient of the 2020 Nobel Peace Prize, for her work with the United Nations World Food Programme.

=== Former SU faculty representatives and student officers ===
- Douglas Wiens: Faculty of Arts Representative (1971); statistician and editor of the Canadian Journal of Statistics.
- Gerry 'Gus' Thorson: Faculty of Physical Education Representative (1981-82); equipment manager for the Calgary Flames for 11 years and prominent figure in Calgary's hockey community.
- Pratima Bansal: Faculty of Social Sciences Representative (1982-83); a prominent economist and fellow of the Royal Society of Canada.
- Christopher J. Coates: two-time Faculty of Science Representative (1985-86, 1986-87); Lieutenant-General of the Royal Canadian Air Force who served as commander of Canadian Joint Operations Command.
- Goldy Hyder: External Affairs (1987-88); former Hill+Knowlton executive, appointed as president and CEO of the Business Council of Canada in 2018.
- Nicholas Devlin: Finance Committee (1991-92); a Justice of the Court of King's Bench of Alberta who previously served as a prosecutor in high-profile cases, including R v. Antic.
- Oliver Ho: Events (2001-02); a Justice of the Court of King's Bench of Alberta and recipient of several awards for mentoring activities.
