= University of Calgary Faculty of Arts =

Canadian university faculty

Faculty of Arts
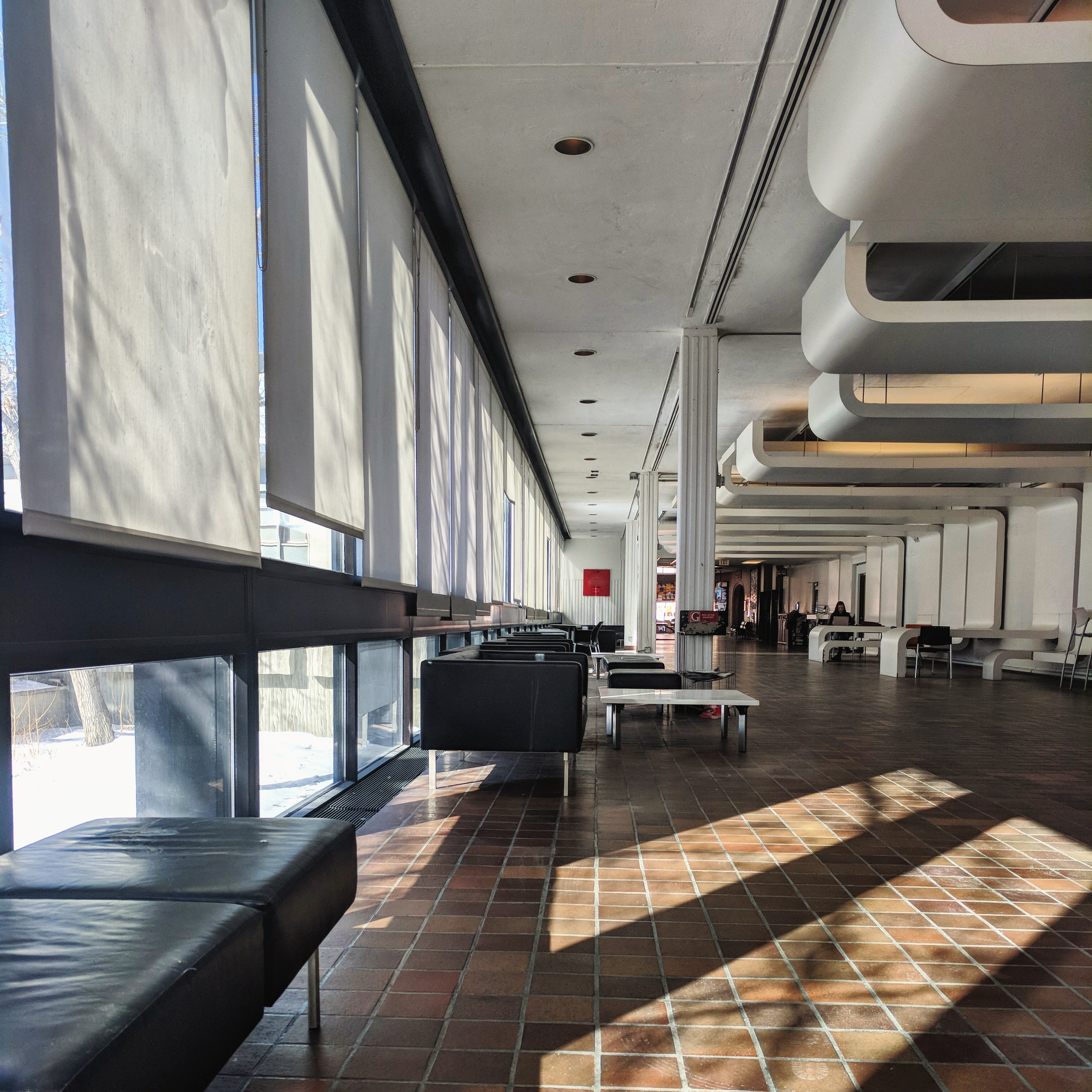
- Former names: Faculty of Communications and Culture; Faculty of Fine Arts; Faculty of Humanities; Faculty of Social Science; Faculty of General Studies; Faculty of Arts and Sciences
- Motto: Mo Shùile Togam Suas (Scottish Gaelic)
- Motto in English: I will lift up mine eyes
- Type: Public
- Established: 10 April 2010
- Academic affiliation: University of Calgary
- Dean: Dr. Leslie Reid (interim)
- Academic staff: 359
- Administrative staff: 132
- Undergraduates: 7,100 +
- Postgraduates: 725 +
- Location: Calgary, Alberta, Canada; 51.079154°N 114.126859°W
- Website: arts.ucalgary.ca

The Faculty of Arts is the largest faculty of the University of Calgary. It is also one of the university's founding faculties, along with commerce, education, engineering, graduate studies, science, and physical education. The official establishment of the current Faculty of Arts was in 2010, following the amalgamation of the four former Faculties of Communication and Culture, Fine Arts, Humanities, and Social Sciences. However, the Faculty of Arts can further trace its origins back to 1951 under the Faculty of Arts and Science, as it was originally merged with the university's natural sciences departments. This curious measure of dates makes the Faculty of Arts the second oldest faculty as well as the youngest faculty of the university simultaneously, depending on where one counts. Since then, the Faculty of Arts has expanded to become the university's most comprehensive and interdisciplinary faculty, incorporating fields from the humanities, fine arts, and social sciences.

Due to its extensive nature, the Faculty of Arts is housed in various buildings throughout the main campus. The Faculty of Arts currently has more than 7,100 undergraduate students with more than 725 graduate students. The student population is overseen by 378 academic faculty members with the aid of 132 administrative and support staff. Since 1966, the Faculty of Arts has produced 10 Canada Research Chairs, 20 fellows of the Royal Society of Canada, and well over 46,000 alumni throughout the world.

== History ==
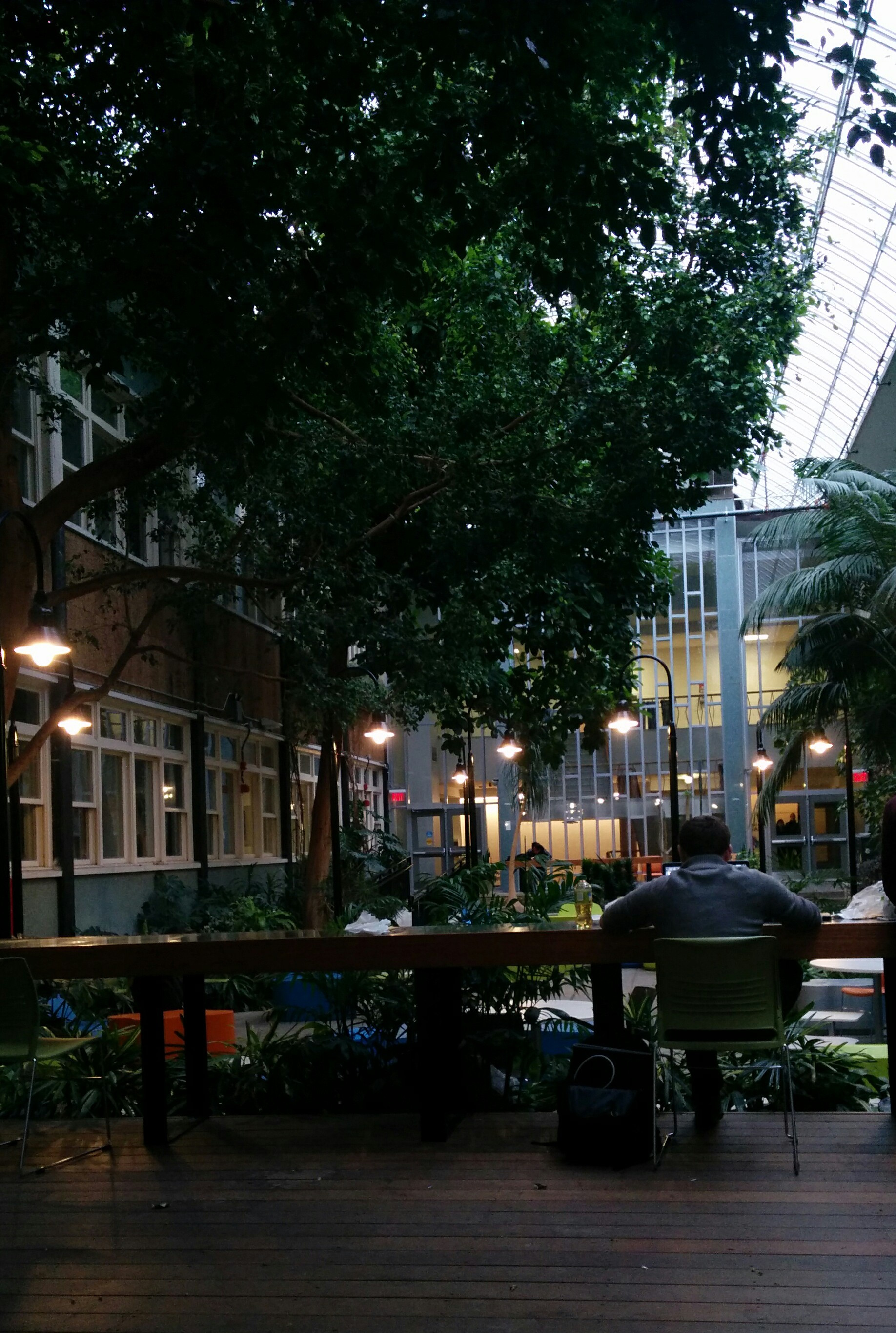
Completed in 1960, the Administration building along with Science A are the two oldest buildings on the university campus. Currently, Administration houses the Department of Psychology and senior administrative offices.

The Faculty of Arts can trace its history back to 1906, when the Calgary Normal School was established as a vocational school for teaching. Initially housed in Central School (later as James Short School), the school later moved in 1908 to the McDougall School to accommodate the growing student body. The school over time, began to offer introductory courses from the arts, sciences, engineering, and commerce. During this early history, the school moved several times: as an occupant of the west wing of the Provincial Institute of Technology and Art (then referred simply as Tech), to King Edward School in 1940, and back to the west wing of the Tech campus in 1945. By 1945, the school was replaced with university level courses, operating as an extension of the University of Alberta Faculty of Education. During this time, Calgary had become the largest Canadian city without a home-grown University. Calgarians were determined to change that fact and formed the University Committee as a vehicle to accelerate the effort to transform the Calgary branch into a full-fledged University. In 1948, the Committee published its first official proposal addressing the need for a "University of Southern Alberta," to the Calgary Chamber of Commerce. The name was later rejected due to its acronym, USA, as to prevent confusion with the United States of America. In 1951, the Calgary branch started to offer first-year Bachelor of Arts and Sciences programmes under the newly established Faculty of Arts and Sciences. In the same year, the Arts and Science Society (ASS) was created to address student "grievances" for the newly established Faculty. This organisation would later become the Faculty of Arts Student's Association (FASA). In 1960 the Calgary branch, known then as the University of Alberta in Calgary (UAC), had moved from the west wing of the Tech campus, to its current location near University Heights. The founding buildings of the new campus were the Arts and Education (present-day Administration) and the Science and Engineering (present-day Science A) buildings, providing instructional courses for the "soft and hard sciences" respectively.

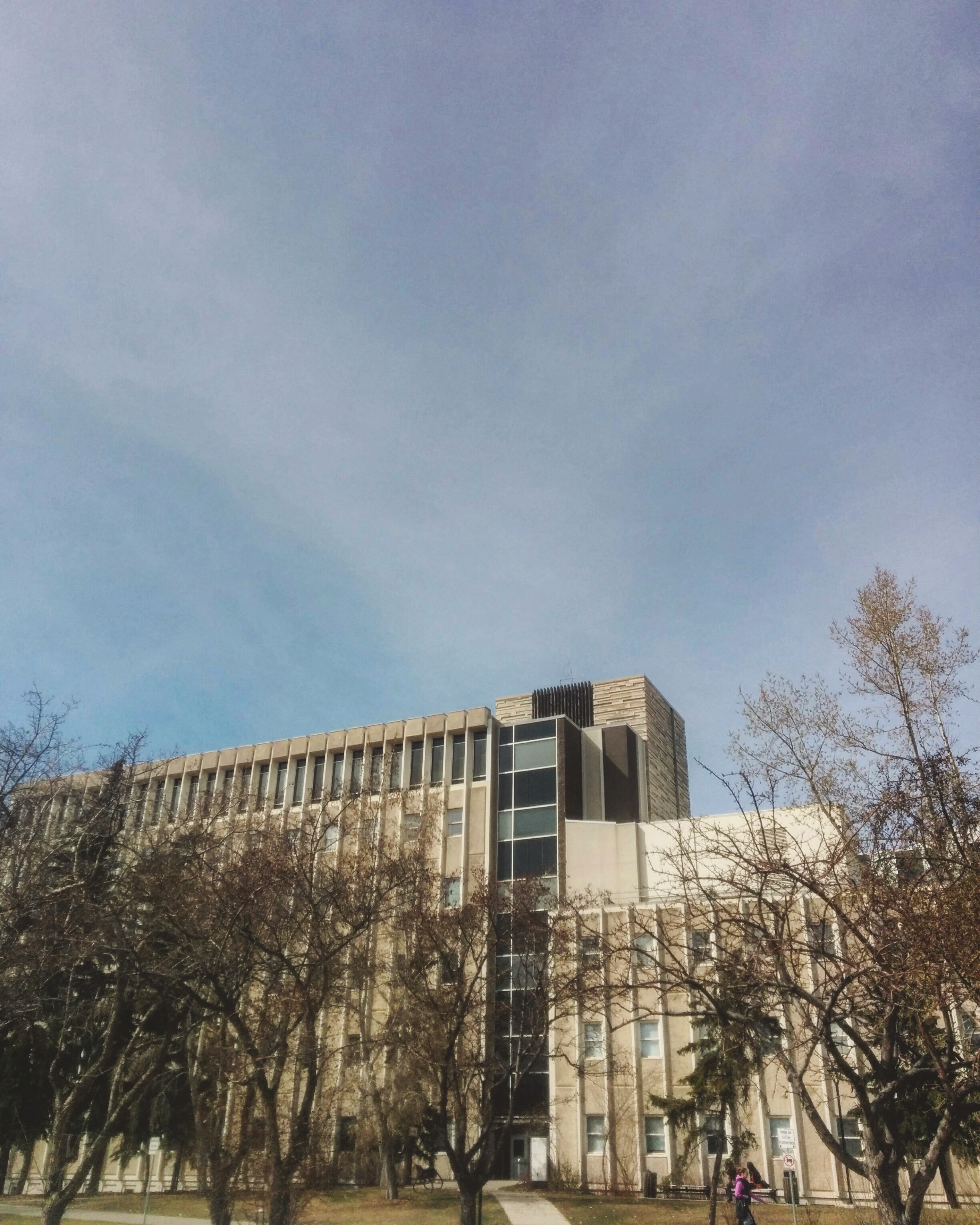
Craigie Hall was originally named Calgary Hall when it was built in 1965, but was renamed after the untimely death of former vice-president (Academic) Peter C. Craigie in 1987.

=== Creation of the University of Calgary ===
The first wave of construction conducted throughout early 1960s reignited conversations among students and citizens about the future of UAC with respect to the main campus in Edmonton. On 8 November 1963, a massive student protest dubbed "the Great Autonomy Demonstration of '63" occurred during a UAC Board of Governors' meeting, where protesters demanded autonomy for the budding UAC. The demonstration featured a headless mannequin with the words "Give UAC her head" and an engineering cog wheel with the words "Autonomy 196?." This secessionist movement would be realised in 1966, when the Universities Act was passed, which declared the University of Calgary an autonomous institution from the University of Alberta. The resulting provincial Act granted the university full academic, financial, and administrative independence. In the same year, the Calgary Hall (renamed Craigie Hall) was officially open, which gave space to the university's diverse humanities and performing arts departments. Concurrently, the university became a trustee of the Banff School of Fine Arts, previously a satellite to the University of Alberta. The Banff School would remain an affiliated body to the university's fine arts departments until 1978, when it became an autonomous institution from the university. To pay homage to its past, the university adopted the colours red and yellow – the former from the Calgary Normal School's azure, navy, and red and the latter from the University of Alberta's evergreen and gold. In 1967, the Faculty of Fine Arts was established, incorporating the departments of dance, drama, music, and visual arts. Shortly afterwards, in 1969, the Social Sciences building reached completion. The brutalist tower would become home to the university's various social science departments.

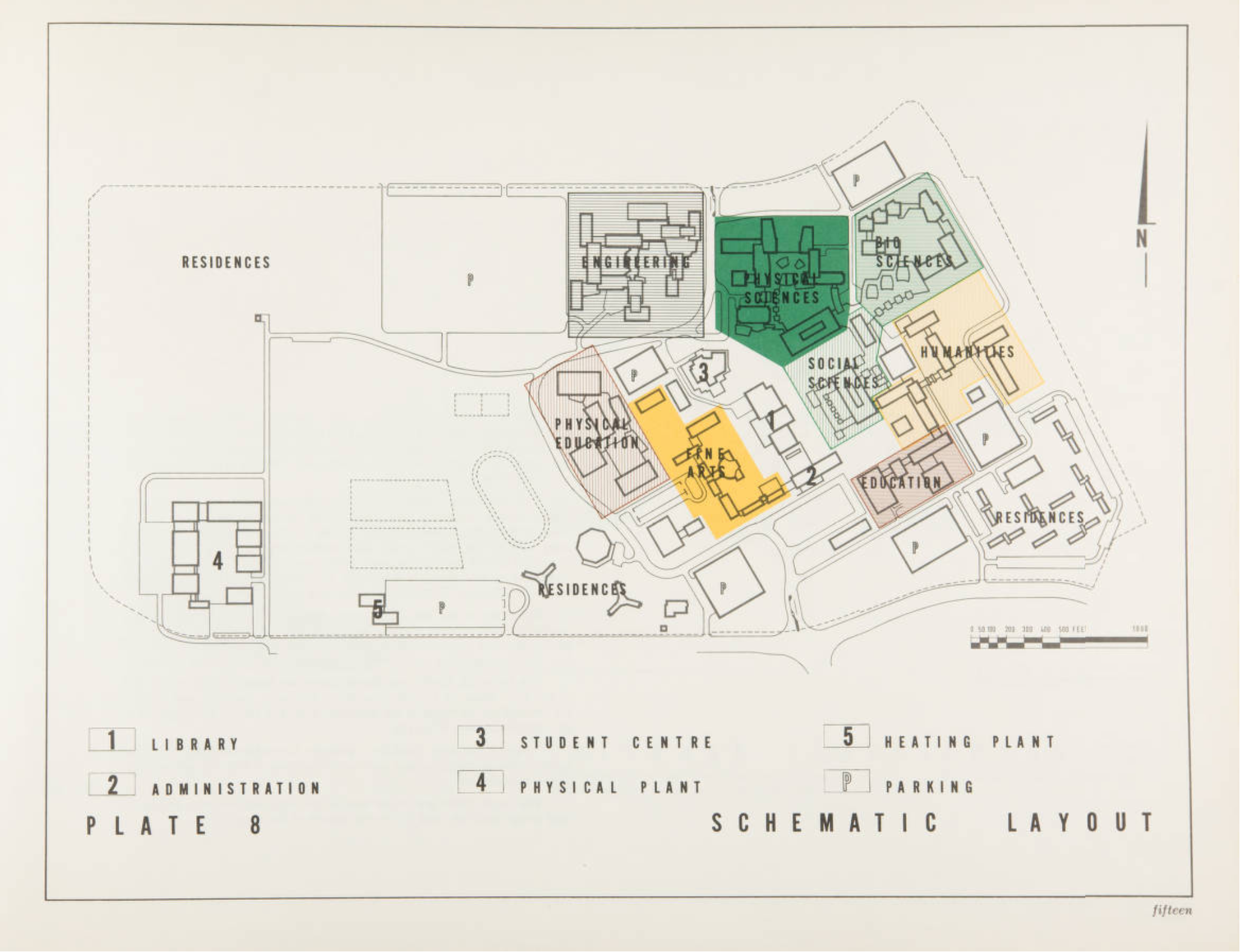
Early plans for the university included an ambitious expansion plan for the major clusters of the present-day Faculty of Arts. Most of these plans were quietly abandoned.

The university experienced a rapid period of growth just five years into autonomy. This led the university into considering ambitious expansion plans for the main campus. According to early schematic plans in 1967, the university desired to create building complexes that represent the major clusters of the present Faculty of Arts: fine arts, humanities, and social sciences. The Humanities Complex would have comprised six buildings of seven to nine stories tall along with a tower of over 13 stories tall, all of which would have been located directly east of present-day Administration – none of these plans materialised. The Social Sciences complex would have comprised the Social Sciences Tower along with several four to seven story tall buildings surrounding present-day Administration – only the Tower was completed. Only the Fine Arts Complex was built in its entirety, however not as originally planned. Due to the unbuilt Humanities Complex, the departments of fine arts have to share their intended space with the university's language, literature, and culture departments. It would take another two decades for the visual arts to obtain their own independent space, albeit reduced from the original plan. The incomplete Social Sciences and Humanities complexes were later abandoned by the mid-1970s for unknown reasons.

=== Decentralised Period ===
In 1972, the Earth Sciences building was completed, housing the departments of earth science, including anthropology, archeology, and geography. University enrolment increased from 3,740 undergraduates in 1966 to 10,864 by a mere decade later. This started to cause administrative problems and efficiency costs for the giant Faculty of Arts and Sciences. This led to the eventual breakup of the faculty in 1976, resulting into the creation of the University College and three separate faculties: the Faculty of Sciences, the Faculty of Social Sciences, and the Faculty of Humanities. In the same year, the interdisciplinary Arctic Institute of North America took up residence on the university campus. In 1981, the University College, whose duties were to register first-year students into general studies, humanities, science, and social science programmes, renamed itself into the Faculty of General Studies.

The university would later experience a second wave of growth when it was announced that Calgary (as well as the university) would host the XV Winter Olympic Games. In preparation for the Games, the university undertook several construction projects such as the Olympic Oval, the Athlete's Village (currently part of Residence), the Jack Simpson Gymnasium, and the Arts Building and Parkade which would house the university's visual arts departments. In 1994, the university played host to the Learned Societies Conference, an academic convention of scholars from the social sciences and humanities. The event witnessed about 8,000 delegates from more than 100 academic organisations, discuss and present their research from their respective fields of discipline. In 1998, following the trends of many North American universities, the university flirted with the idea of reorganising and condensing various departments and faculties as a measure to "encourage collaboration while maintaining their separate identities." If realised, this move would have led to the creation of academic strategic clusters or "super-Faculties," which would have merged fine arts, general studies, and humanities into the Faculty of Arts and Humanities, while merging education and social sciences into the Faculty of Education and Social Science. In 2000, the Faculty of General Studies renamed itself again to become the Faculty of Communications and Culture, which better reflected the faculty's teaching and research activities

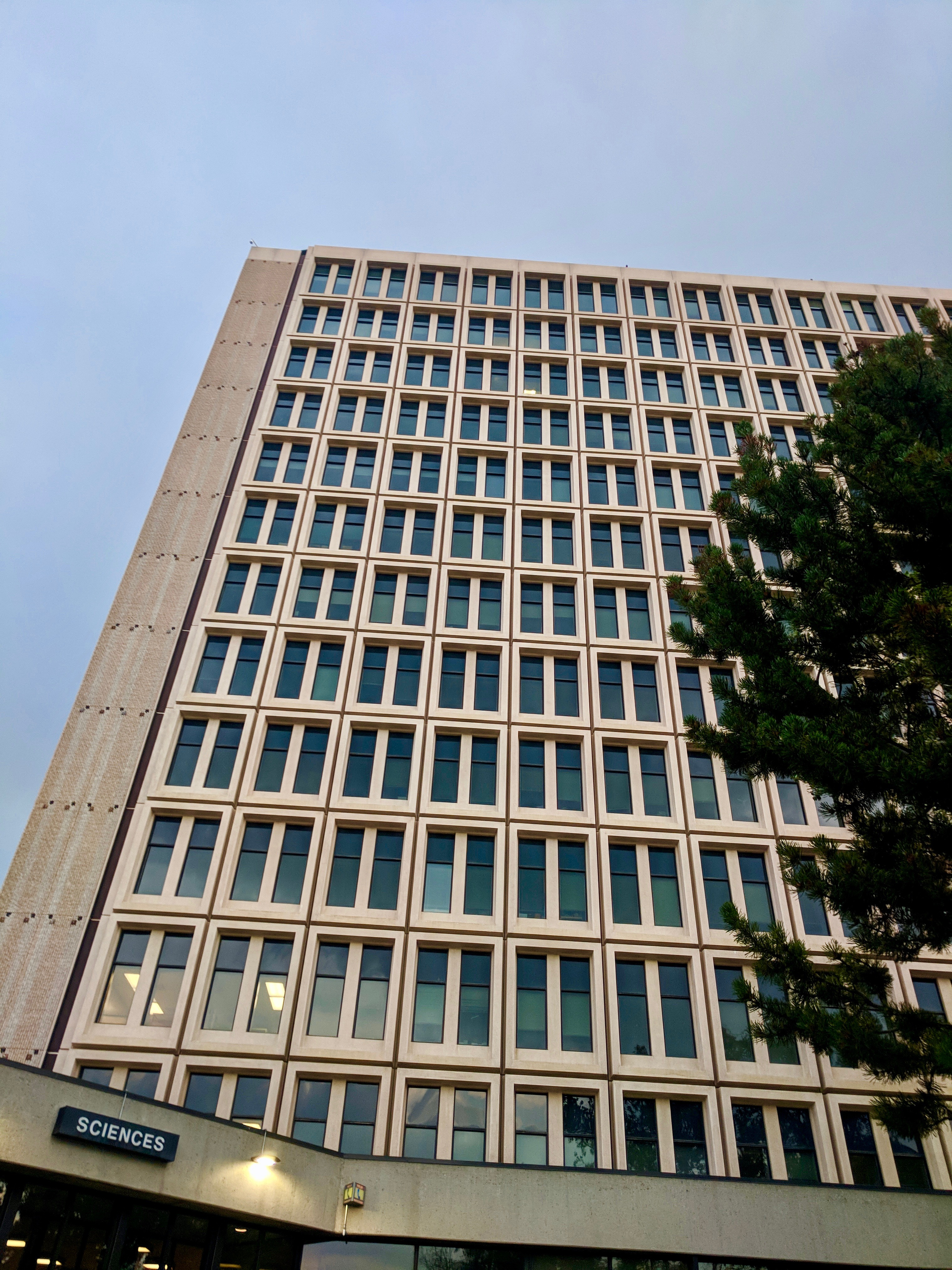
Like most buildings during the Calgary oil boom, the Social Sciences Tower was constructed under the brutalist architectural design.

=== Creation of the Faculty of Arts ===
On 25 June 2009, the University Board of Governors voted to reunify the four separate faculties of Communication and Culture, Fine Arts, Humanities, and Social Sciences into a single amalgam, the Faculty of Arts. The new streamlined Faculty was finalised on 1 April 2010, and was designed to conform with other Canadian research universities, most of whom "have two or fewer arts and social science-type faculties." The departments of Music, Dance, and Drama would later merge in July 2013 to form the School of Creative and Performing Arts. In the same year, plans were announced that the university would no longer offer 19 undergraduate programmes in the upcoming academic year—10 of which belonged to the Faculty of Arts. Among these suspended programmes included the History and Philosophy of Science programme – the only such programme offered in the province of Alberta. In 2014, it was announced that the departments of Greek and Roman Studies and Religion had merged into a single department of Classics and Religion. Simultaneously, the department of Archaeology and Anthropology had merged in the same year. The year of 2016 was celebrated as the university's semicentennial, marking 50 years of autonomy and academia. On 28 May to 3 June 2016, the university played host again to the 75th Congress of the Humanities and Social Sciences, welcoming 8,000 delegates, 70 academic organisations, and more than 5,000 research papers to be housed on the university campus. In June 2016, negotiations for the School of Languages, Linguistics, Literatures, and Cultures (SLLLC) were finalised as an effort to condense the university's humanities departments into a single collective entity. SLLLC was officially inaugurated in February 2019.

== Student life ==
The Faculty of Arts is governed from the Office of the Dean of Arts, whose facilities are housed on the 13th floor of the Social Sciences tower. The faculty, however, encourages student participation through the use of department groups such as the Faculty of Arts Students' Association, whose duties include the management of the Arts Lounge found on the 2nd floor of the Social Sciences tower in room SS 217. Arts students have a variety of opportunities provided by the faculty to supplement their undergraduate and graduate experience. Co-op work experience programmes are made available for students who wish to pursue them. Various student-run clubs exist around campus to cater to the interests of arts students and non-arts students alike. Undergraduate department associations, ranging from archaeology to women's studies, provide services and a sense of community among students of similar programmes. Due to the size of the Arts student population, the faculty is granted 4 Students' Union representatives, to oversee the affairs of arts students with the University Administration.

=== Campus Culture ===
Being the second oldest and largest Faculty, the Arts has contributed a great deal to the history of the university.

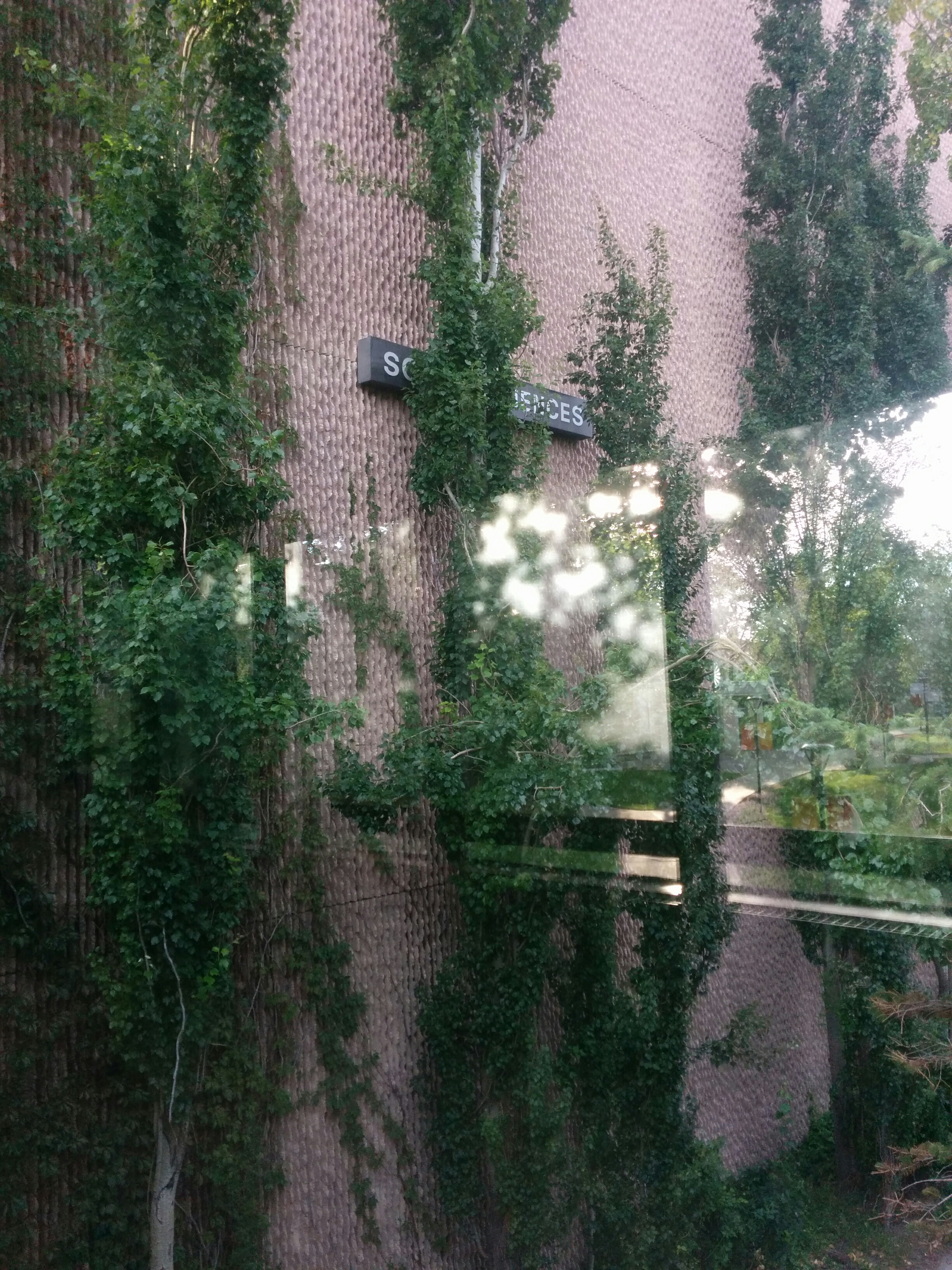
The Social Science building's southern wall has been subject to student folklore. In current day, due to rain exposure, plants have grown onto the formerly acidic stone wall. Above the first E on the Social Science sign, one can faintly see a black ball, supporting evidence of the climbing myth.

==== Climbing the Social Sciences building ====
Completed shortly after autonomy, the building was one of the oldest towers to overlook the current University campus. There is an old myth among arts students that the original architects envisioned a green-ivy-grown southern face, hence the lattice like design. As the myth continues, the architects did not take into account the acidity of the building's exterior structure, which made it unsuitable to support such climbing plants. However, years of rain exposure has washed the building's exterior to lower acidic levels, giving reason to the minimal plants that grow along the tower's base.

Social Sciences would become intertwined with similar campus legend. This time involving a student, who for reasons unknown, attempted to mount an expedition along the southern face of the beige Tower. The event has been said to have occurred during the Bermuda Shorts Day of 1982 or 1983. Former students, university staff, and members of the faculty have recalled a similar incident, however the event remains unconfirmed. The University Archives and Special Collections do maintain that they have a photograph of two people climbing the building with rock climbing equipment in their collections from April 1985. Strangely enough, students have noticed a mysterious black tennis ball wedged just above the Social Sciences building sign, which used to be visible from the connecting bridge from Social Science to Administration. This ball is no longer visible due to exterior renovations of the Tower in the 2016–2017 academic year.

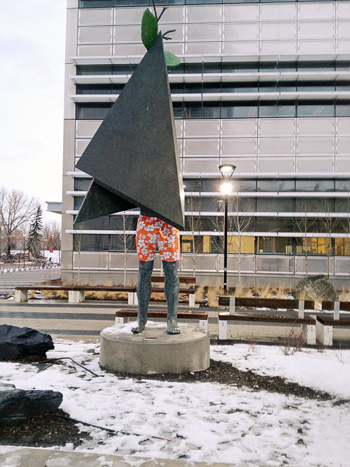
The "Nature is an Eternal Mystery" statue on Bermuda Shorts Day is often a target by BSD celebrants. Main celebrations typically occur off campus on Unwin Road NW – specifically between Urquhart Road NW and Ulster Road NW. This area is referred to as "D-Block" by students.

==== Bermuda Shorts Day ====
Bermuda Shorts Day is a cornerstone event of student life, however this event had more modest origins. In the summer of 1959, arts student Alan Arthur was ridiculed for wearing shorts in public, an apparent uncommon occurrence for men during the time. In the following year, on Thursday, 31 March 1960, Arthur who was the inaugural Associate-Editor for the newly created student-run newspaper the Gauntlet at the time, took to the campus advertisement board and wrote in chalk, words of what would become the start of a campus tradition. It is hotly contested what the original words were exactly, but one variant goes that Arthur wrote "Tomorrow is Bermuda Shorts Day. Everyone wear Bermuda Shorts." Arthur has stated that he wrote the now immortal words, in part to the arrival of warm spring weather, in jest as a light-hearted April Fools joke, and as an unlikely way to reduce stigma around men donning short-cut trousers. The famed arts alumnus, Maurice Yacowar – who was The Gauntlet's inaugural Editor-in-Chief at the time – was a contemporary and personal friend of Arthur. Yacowar recalls that many individuals of the UAC's 250 student population stayed true to Arthur's announcement, and wore Bermuda shorts that April Fools of 1960. The first BSD, according to Arthur and Yacowar, was a more innocent affair, featuring a highly competitive marbles tournament.

Due to a controversial article entitled "Don't Wear a Poppy," Yacowar was abruptly fired from his position as Editor-in-chief just five months in, receiving a 56.4% student-wide favourability rating against his dismissal. He was then succeeded by his friend Arthur, becoming the second Gauntlet Editor-in-chief. The pair would later graduate in 1962 to pursue lives in academia. Arthur who received a degree in History would later become a – now retired – Professor of History from Brock University while Yacowar, who received a degree in English, would become Emeritus Professor of English and future Dean of Humanities here in the University of Calgary. However, little did Arthur know just how powerful those 9 words would become, as the event gained increasing popularly for students to destress before exams. The BSDs of later years would feature pie duels with the University President, musical gatherings in Administration, games of squamish, and a tricycle race between SU representatives. In 1989, the university with the Students' Union introduced the BSD of modern day, with a single area which included the concert grounds and beer gardens.

In 2014, the University Administration held its first UCalgaryStrong Festival, which was initially meant to honour the victims of the 2014 Calgary Stabbing. The festival has since become a wholesome year-end celebration, featuring carnival-style games and crafts. It functions as a non-alcoholic alternative to Bermuda Shorts Day.

==== Calgary School ====
There is a prevalent myth among students, alumni, and outsiders alike of the perceived conservative or right-leaning themes that surround factions of the social science departments of the faculty, particularly in the departments of political science, economics, and history. This is due, in part, by the so-called Calgary School, which was a loose, informal collection of former graduates and faculty members who have contributed in some measure, to the modern conservative movement in Alberta and Canada. The existence of the "School" has become common knowledge among students and members of the faculty. Several arts graduates and faculty members have been known to place prominently in the Conservative Party of Canada and have held various notable positions in government of arts alumnus Stephen Harper. This perception is strengthened by the popular presence of student-run campus clubs representing centre-right political parties on both the provincial and federal level.

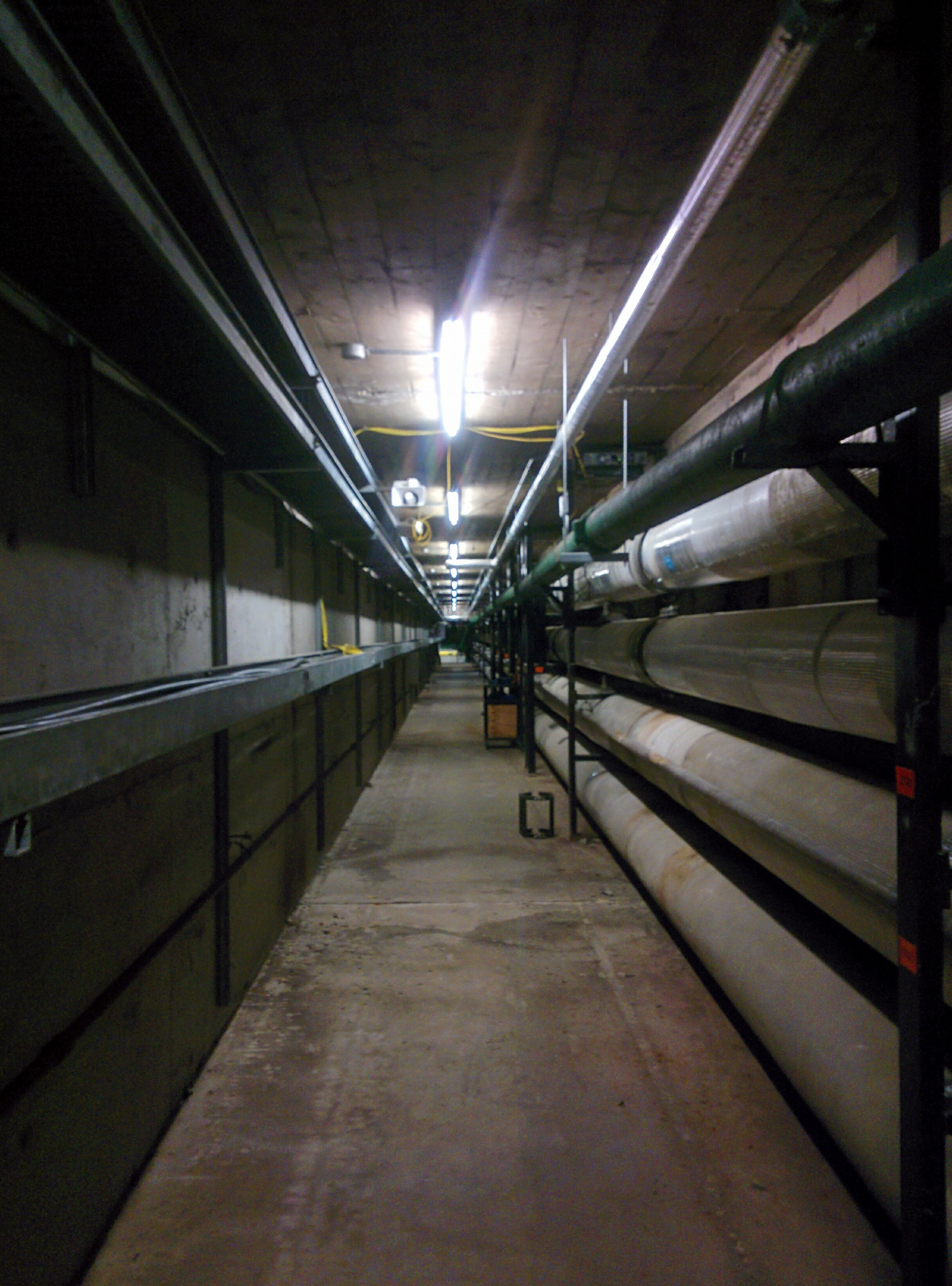
In an effort to re-open the Science A - Administration tunnel, a 1966 Gauntlet editorial proposed that "the underground central heating system tunnels could symbolize the purpose of the University: to guide us to the light of knowledge."

==== Science A - Administration Tunnel ====
The existence of tunnels on campus has sparked the imagination of students since the early years of the university. There are, of course, the tunnels that connect the residence buildings with the Dining Centre, as well as the multiple maintenance tunnels which provide central heating and water to every building on campus. However, the oldest of these tunnels is the one that connects the two oldest buildings on campus, Science A with Administration. Then called the Science and Engineering building and the Arts and Education building respectively, this tunnel provided students passage from the harsh prairie winters between 1960 and 1963. This tunnel usage was described by a 1961 editorial from the Gauntlet: "A tunnel between Arts-Education Building and the Science-Engineering Building does exist...but this tunnel more closely resembles a catacomb than a tunnel," only suitable for "troglodytes [who] never come out in the sun." This tunnel however, also functioned as a central heating tunnel, carrying pipes containing pressurised water, hot steam, and electrical wiring. It was for this reason that they were closed by the board of governors, due to the potential hazards that the central heating pipes could have on transiting students. Reactions from students were widely negative, and several attempts to re-open the tunnels continued well into the late 1960s. A 1963 Gauntlet editorial summarised the general student reaction: "The tunnel was closed closed to spare us the danger of being parboiled, and this shows a gratifying concern for our welfare. But I, for one, would prefer to die warm." This tunnel still exists today. The tunnel empties its steam from surface vents that protrude the earth in front of the southwest door of Science A and the west doors of Administration. They can only be accessed from Rooms SA 01V, AD 10A, and AD 39V. This tunnel can be seen the Interactive Room Finder under Room SA 01Z.

==== UAC Student Council Election 1964 ====
Prior to the tradition of painting rocks, a curious incident occurred during the 1964 UAC Student's Council election, where Education candidate Francis Somerville brought "Sylvia", a donkey from the Calgary Zoo, as a publicity vehicle for his election campaign. Under the helm of campaign manager Ron Dougan, Sylvia was adorned with a blanket etched onto it "Don't be a jackass vote Francis." Unfortunately, Somerville would lose that election by a handful of votes to his two female opponents. However, in the same year, he would become the president of the Education Undergraduate Society. Ironically, Dougan would have more luck than his client, when in the following year, he would become the UAC Council representative for Education in 1965.

==== Soft drink dispute ====
In 1997, the university decided to make Pepsi Cola Canada Beverages the exclusive supplier of cold drinks on campus, which was a common trend among North American universities. This infuriated some students who regarded the move as undermining institutional independence to a multinational corporation. The rock became a figurative soapbox for "pop soda libertarians", adopting red and white slogans Always Coca-Cola. An underground "anti-Pepsi movement" emerged on campus, advocating for the protection of soft drink alternatives to the Pepsi brand. The "movement" did very little to hurt the university's business relations with the soda giant. However, on certain department floors of Social Science (history and political science particularly), vintage Pepsi machines have been known to offer selections of Coca-Cola products with labels saying Always Coca-Cola attached to the machine's dispensary hole. The existence of such soda machines is quite curious, but it points to the possibly that some arts students and faculty members are still continuing the cause for campus-wide soda freedom. In September 2017, the Board of Governor's announced their decision to switch from Pepsi Cola to Coca-Cola, as the former's contract had expired.

==== "I. M. Hungry" student protest ====
Strangely enough, this was not the first incident where students took up arms over Campus food. On 28 September 1965, a group of former arts and sciences UAC students, Charles Szuch, Michael "Mike" McEwan, Patrick "Pat" Tivy and Donald "Don" Dewar, along with former engineer UAC student Terrance "Terry" Peressini, staged a fake funeral for the figurative fallen student I. M. Hungry in front of the Food Centre (now Dining Centre). According to the participants, the event was done to protest "only the quantity of the food, not the quality." The protest featured a shaky rendition of Taps interpreted by McEwan and a makeshift horn from newspaper. The funeral protest laid to rest the soul of I. M. Hungry, symbolised by the 'body' of former commerce student Stephanie Baker."

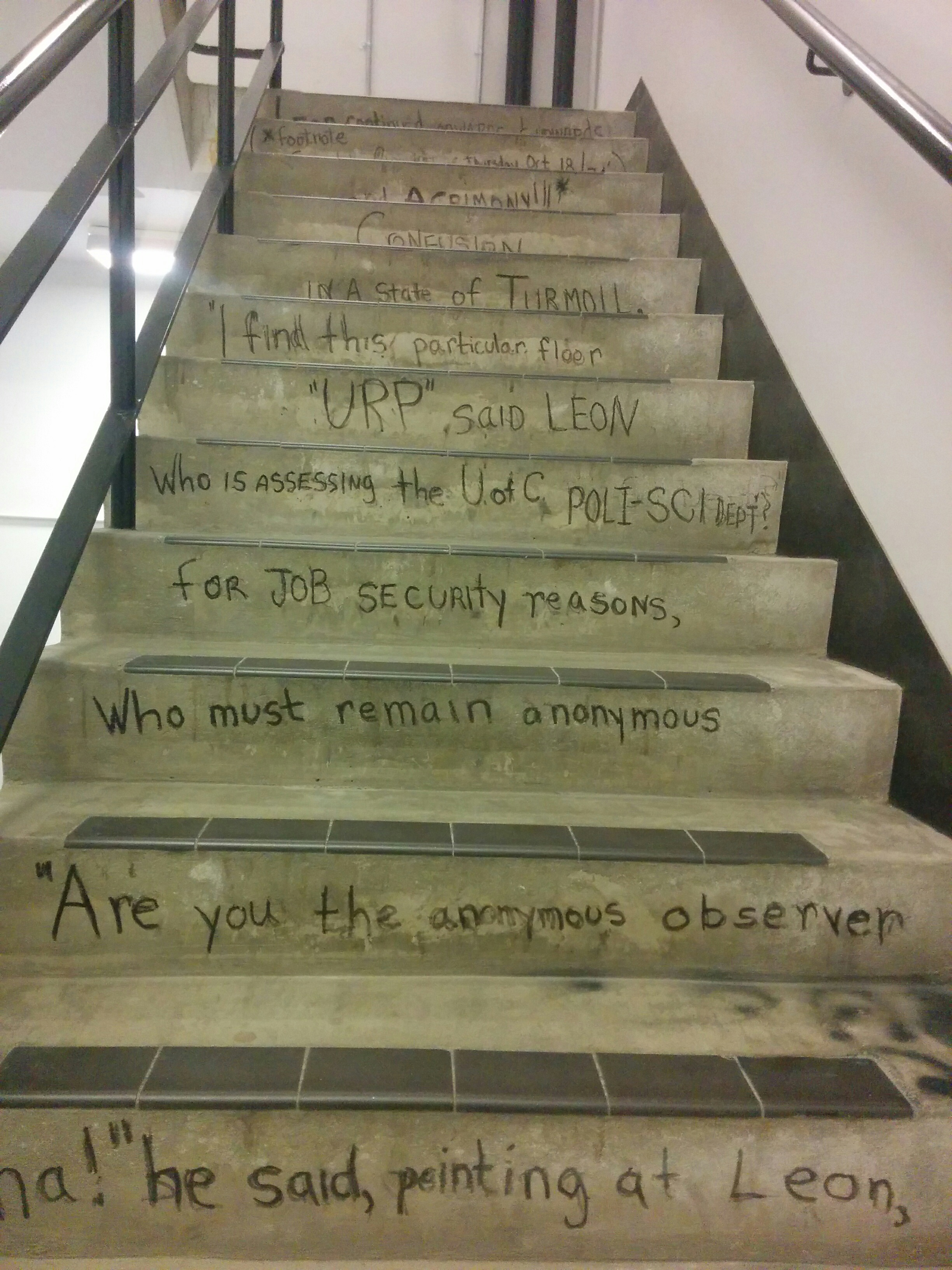
Leon the Frog, written in the early 1970s, has constantly been revitalised by consecutive generations of students due to stairwell renovations and usage wearing down the original words.

==== Tale of Leon the Frog ====
One of the most beloved features among arts students is the saga known as "The Tale of Leon the Frog" which was originally written in the early 1970s on top of the stairwell in Social Sciences. It chronicles the journey of a young frog named Leon and features overheard conversations of students from the time. Such existentialist musings from the 13-flights-of-stairs long poem include:

"What is art? Where is?... am I here? Where is my will power? These are barbaric conditions. Is this the hallmark of my life?"

Former writer for the now-defunct University of Calgary Gazette, Cathy McLaughlin summarises that "Leon begins, on the basement floor of the Social Sciences stairwell, an existential search for identity and the 'light at the top of the stairs.' He escapes dissection, crucifixion, sexual harassment and an attempt to sell him insurance before hopping, finally, to the 13th floor, where art and a chance to 'express and communicate his experiences to society,' offers some solace." The suspects who knowingly vandalised campus property have consistently claimed the work was done for the art. The five individuals responsible, who have been later identified as arts alumni, were Joane Cardinal-Schubert, Tony Acosta, Robin Laurence, Catherine McAvity, and Rita McKeough. Cardinal-Schubert has stated that the amphibious hero of the poem is a "metaphor for a student...lost in space." The exact dating of this self-termed "happening" has not been entirely confirmed. However, McLaughlin, has hypothesised "the sixth floor segment quotes from a Gauntlet article of Oct. 18, 1974, citing "turmoil, confusion and acrimony" in the political science department, and narrowing Leon's probable date of authorship.," indicating that the "happening" took place around 1974:

"I find this particular [seventh] floor in a state of turmoil, confusion, and acrimony!*" (Footnote: see the Gauntlet of Thursday Oct. 18/74)

The main character himself has been a source of debate, particularly the stylistic naming choice of Leon for an adventurous frog. Campus historians Peter Fortna, Martina King, and Doug McColl have theorised that the name Leon might have been inspired by professor emeritus of Biological Sciences, Dr. Leon W. Browder. This was partly due to his academic tenure coinciding with the speculated period of the early 1970s. Strangely enough, Browder was fondly remembered for his research on early embryonic development for Xenopus laevis, commonly referred to as the African Clawed Frog.

In April 2017, the Tale of Leon the Frog was painted over by the university maintenance for being mistaken for graffiti. To much of the dismay of arts students and alumni, efforts to restore the Tale were undertaken. This effort was completed in May 2017.

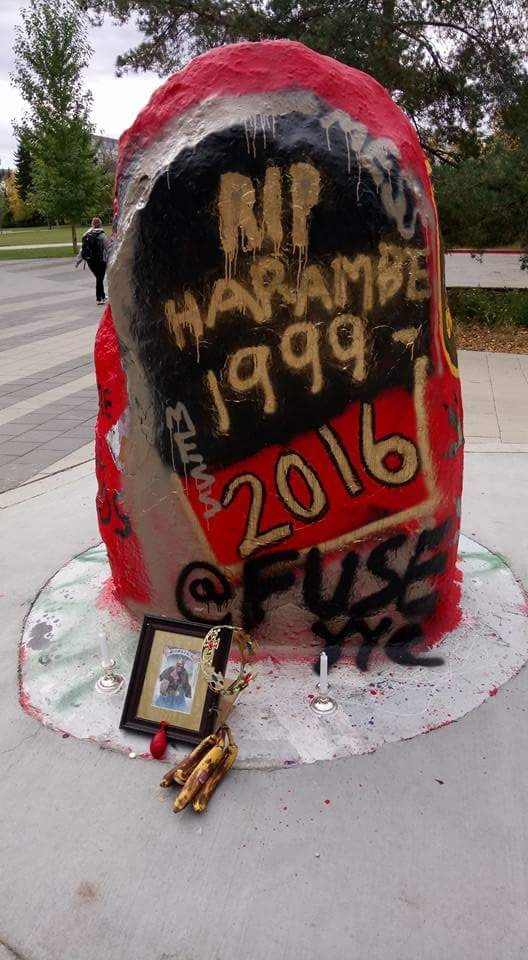
Graffiti on the Rocks are often reflections of student opinions. A prominent example occurred in October 2016, when student activists staged a candlelight vigil for the slain gorilla Harambe, transforming one rock as an makeshift shrine.

==== The campus rocks ====
The infamous paint-covered boulders that are found throughout the campus, affectionately known as "the Rocks," have become an integral part of campus culture. This is reflected in the University Registrar's phone numbers sometimes ending with the four digits -7625 (ROCK). The original rock has moved about the campus three times, initially placed north of Craigie Hall for a month, and was later moved east of the MacEwan Student Centre (MacHall). It was then moved to its current location adjacent to Swann Mall and the Registrar, to make way for the 2000 expansion of MacHall. The original rock was unearthed in the summer of 1968 during excavation for the future Social Science building. Campus geologists have determined the rock's origins to be of the Jasper National Park region prior to the last glacial age. The rock was scheduled for removal, but was rescued by members of the Arts Faculty who thought it would serve as an "excellent forum for students to voice their opinion."

Since that summer, the rock has become a common target for students to paint messages and other graphics, as well as to provide for an unmistakable meeting place for students and faculty alike. Soon messages of congratulation such as "Yay Finally Graduated" to the more political "Lougheed is a bum," began to grace the façade of these no-longer-grey rocks. The Administration accepted this curious trend willingly, as it seemed to remove desire from the students to vandalise other buildings on campus. The rocks are often painted to advertise campus events, signal the start of new semesters, and in protest to current affairs.

==== Ghost of Earth Science ====
Rumours of a resident ghost have sprung up by arts students and alumni alike, claiming to have seen sightings of a brown-haired woman in the Department of Anthropology and Archaeology in Earth Sciences. The Faculty Club was a former cafeteria and bar for the university's staff, originally located on the 7th floor of Earth Sciences in 1973, but permanently moved to the 4th floor of MacHall in 1985. Individuals have noticed strange apparitions regarding a "pleasant looking woman" with medium brown hair. The identity of this brunette, sweater wearing poltergeist is unknown, but several people have speculated it to be the former University Advisor to Women's Studies (1960-1966), Dr. Aileen A. Hackett Fish. Dr. Fish died on 3 March 1977, but left a long legacy of civil service, women's rights advocacy, and community involvement In 1973, Dr. Fish was awarded the Order of Canada medal and an honorary degree from the University of Calgary in 1976, both for her outstanding service at the community level. The Beta Sigma Phi Sorority established the Dr. Aileen Fish Memorial Bursary award shortly after her death, due to her strong relations with the sorority.

== Notable alumni and faculty ==
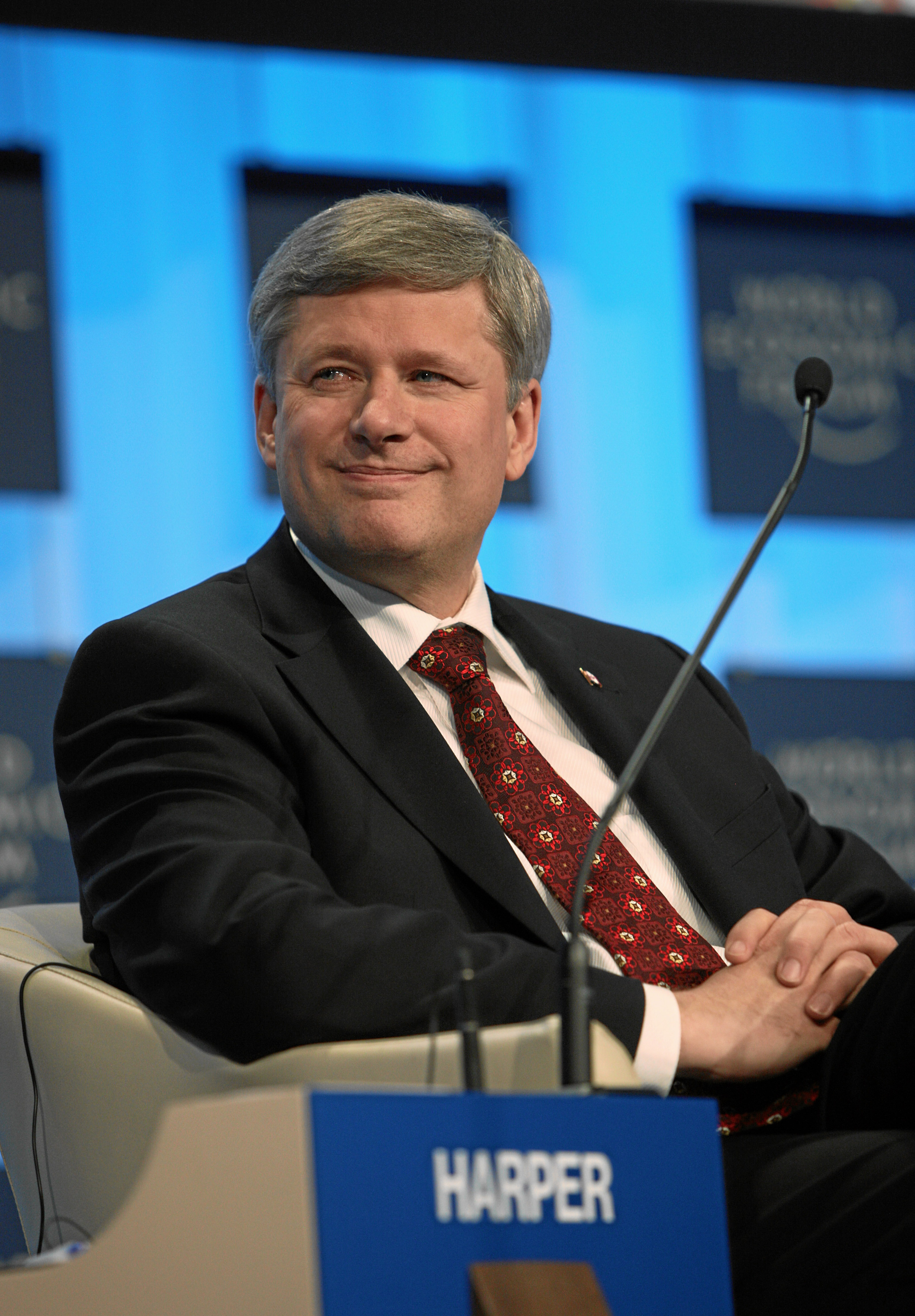
Rt. Hon. Stephen Harper PC MP, 22nd prime minister of Canada. (BA in Economics, 1985; MA in Economics, 1991)

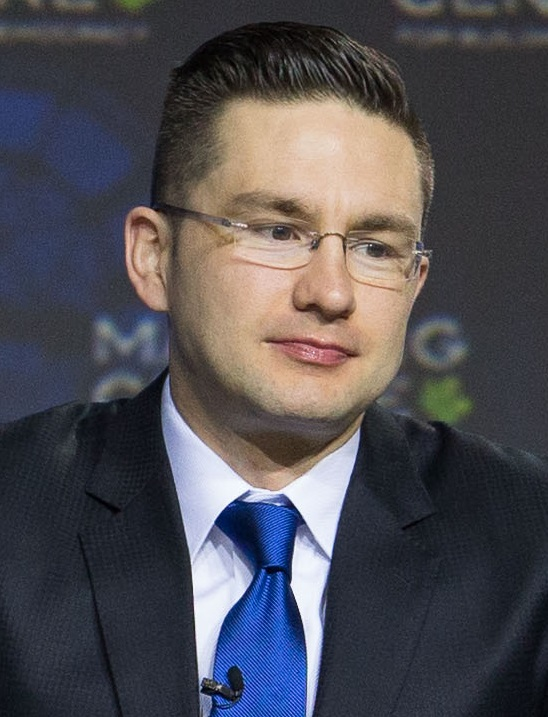
Hon. Pierre Poilievre PC MP, Official Opposition Critic for the Treasury Board. (BA in International Relations)

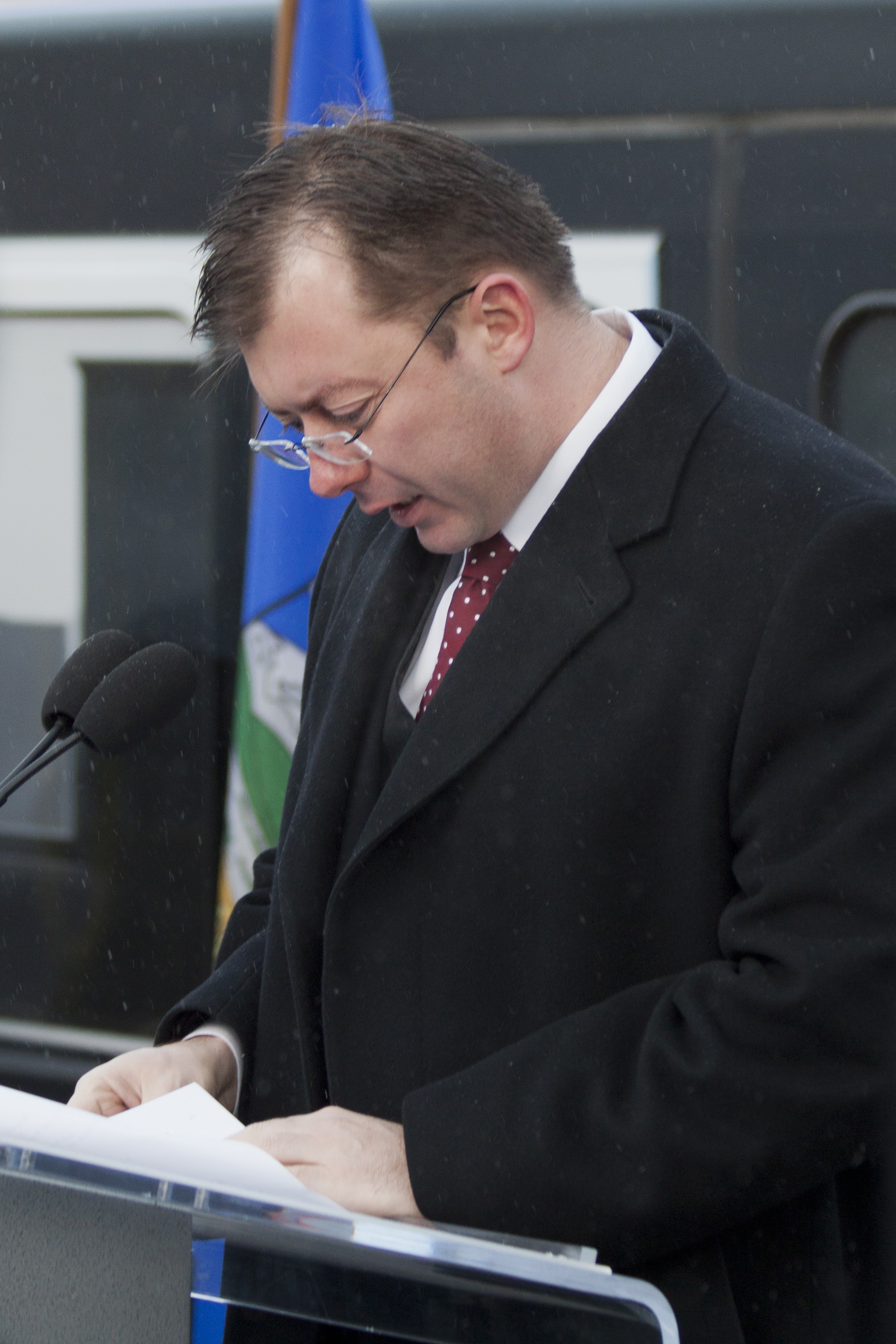
Robert Anders MP, former Member of the Canadian Parliament for Calgary West. (BA in Political Science)

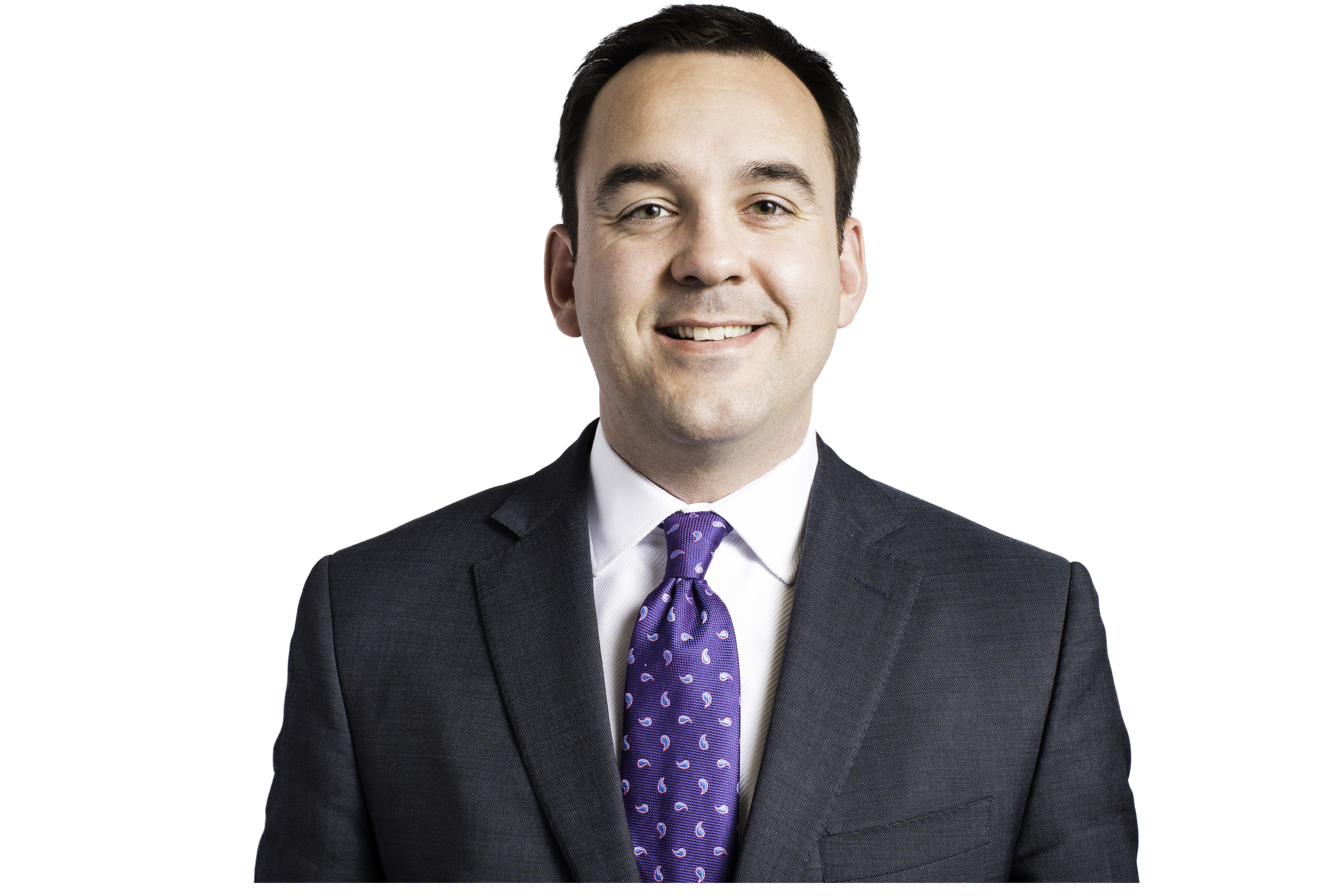
Blake Richards MP, Official Opposition Critic for Tourism. (BA in Political Science)

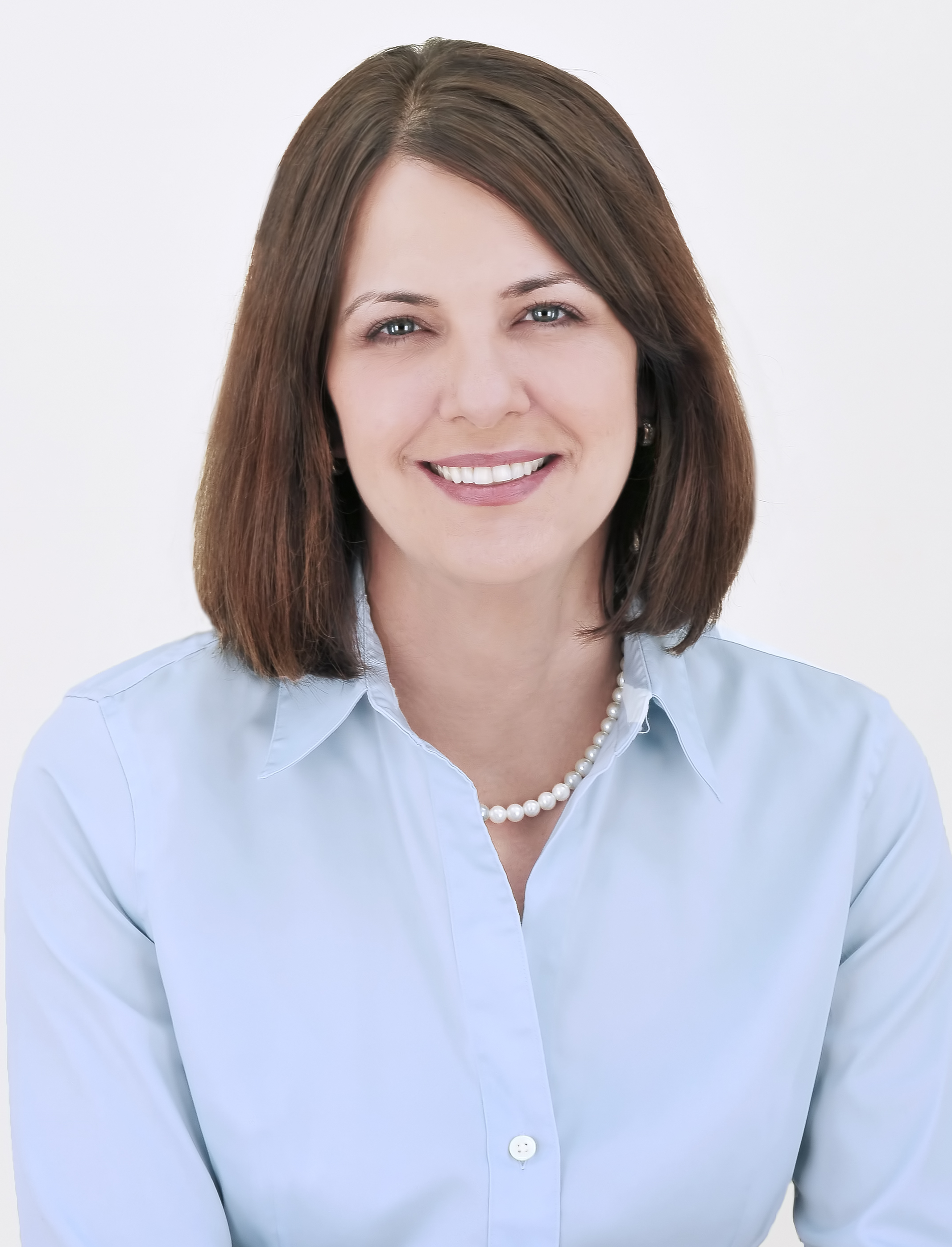
Danielle Smith MLA, 19th premier of Alberta. (BA in Economics and English, 1997)

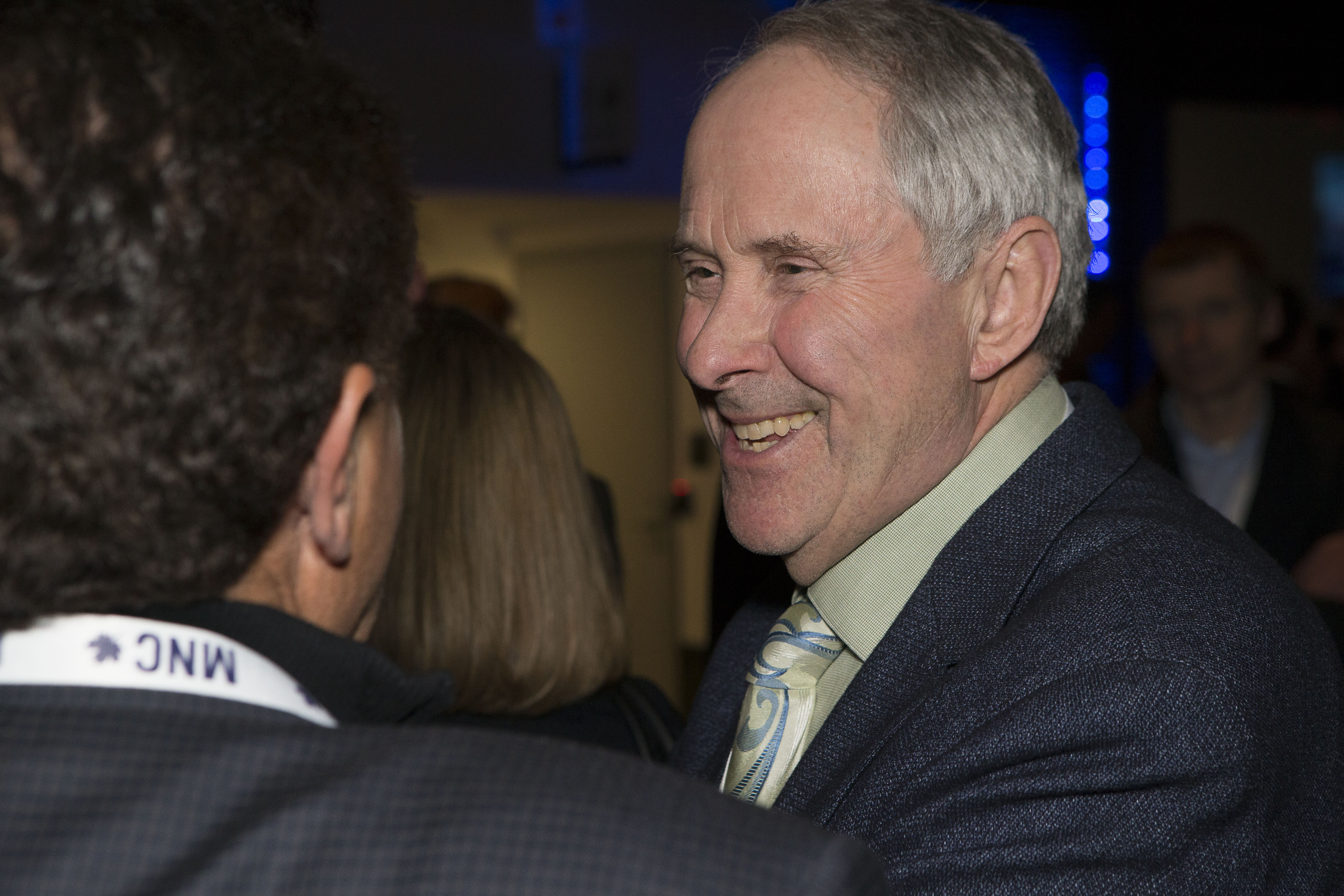
Thomas Flanagan CM FRSC, Professor Emeritus of Political Science.
