= Viola Birss =

Canadian electrochemistry researcher

Viola Ingrid Birss
- Born: Crowsnest Pass, Alberta
- Education: University of Auckland
- Known for: Electrochemistry; Solid oxide fuel cells
- Awards: David C. Grahame Award (2017)
- Scientific career
- Workplaces: University of Ottawa; University of Calgary

Viola Ingrid Birss is a Professor of Chemistry at the University of Calgary and has been the holder of a Tier 1 Canada Research Chair in Fuel Cells and Related Clean Energy Systems for two 7-year terms. She works on electrochemical and nanomaterial technologies to advance clean energy and environmental applications.

== Early life and education ==
Birss grew up in Crowsnest Pass, Alberta. She moved to Calgary at the age of ten. When she was deciding what to study at college, she felt that physics was "too abstract" and biology "too descriptive", so settled on chemistry. Having grown up with the wilderness close to her home, Birss was always aware of the environment, and interested in identifying clean ways of storing, converting and using energy. This attracted her to materials science and electrochemistry. Birss earned her doctorate at the University of Auckland as a Commonwealth Scholar, where she studied the electrochemistry of metal halide and metal sulfide monolayers and thin films on silver electrodes. Her doctoral thesis was titled Electrochemical studies of anodic films on silver. She was a postdoctoral research scientist at the University of Ottawa, where she worked on the supercapacitive properties of hydrous metal oxides. During this post, she specialized in studies of Ru oxide.

== Research and career ==
Birss began her independent career at Alcan International, where she helped develop techniques to evaluate the susceptibility of aluminum alloys to stress corrosion and pitting. Her efforts included efforts to understand how to stabilize and protect a high-strength corrosion-resistant alloy: Al-Mg-Si alloy. She moved to the University of Calgary in 1983 where she was an Assistant Professor until 1987, an Associate Professor until 1991, then promoted to Full Professor.

Birss prepares, characterizes and optimizes nanomaterials for a range of different electrochemical applications, including in fuel cells, electrolysis cells, batteries, capacitors and sensors. In her earlier work in Calgary, Birss and her team focused on understanding and modifying the electrochemical, chemical, physical and morphological properties of thin films on electrode surfaces, ranging from conducting polymers to a range of redox-active, hydrous, metal oxides. In 2002, she was a founder and leader of the Western Canada Fuel Cell Initiative, which included over 35 research groups at eight institutions. This was supported by $2 million of funding under Birss' leadership. She subsequently co-founded the pan-Canadian Solid Oxide Fuel Cells Canada NSERC Research Network, an umbrella organization for groups working on solid oxide fuel cells. The focus of this 5 year network, which involved over 16 research groups at 8 universities across Canada, as well as government and industry partners, was focused mostly on the development of anodes that resist both sulfur contaminant poisoning and coking when operated on hydrogen from natural gas.

Birss became a Tier 1 Canada Research Chair in Fuel Cells at the University of Calgary in 2004, holding the chair for two 7-year terms. The majority of her efforts as a CRC were focused on solid oxide fuel cells (SOFCs) and proton-exchange membrane fuel cells (PEMFCs), carbon nanomaterials, and electrochemical biological sensing. Some of her main contributions have involved determining the kinetics and mechanisms of oxidation and reduction reactions in fuel cells using electrochemical methods, as well as developing new fuel cell materials. Her team improved the performance and lifetime of low temperature PEMFCs through the development of ordered nanoporous carbon powders as well as self-supported, nanoporous carbon scaffolds. For use in high temperature solid oxide cells, Birss has further developed metal oxide perovskite catalysts that can be used as both the anode and cathode in both solid oxide fuel cells and solid oxide electrolysis cells, catalyzing carbon dioxide splitting, water splitting, hydrogen and carbon monoxide oxidation, and oxygen reduction. Other areas of research have included the development of core shell nanoparticles, protective coatings and other novel strategies to combat the corrosion of metals, as well as selective and sensitive electrochemical biosensors for the detection of pathogens.

Birss is currently the Scientific Director of CAESR-Tech (Calgary Advanced Energy Storage and Conversion Research Technologies), a large cluster of scientists and engineers who are focused on electrochemical technologies. This includes electrolysis cells, fuel cells, a variety of batteries and electrochemical capacitors, as well as electricity management and LCA, all at the University of Calgary. The CAESR-Tech cluster then spawned the ME2 NSERC CREATE student training center. Birss currently also serves as the Co-Lead of the Electrolysis Theme of HyPT (Hydrogen Production Technologies), a Global Research Center.

=== Awards and honours ===
Her awards and honours include;

- 2021 Fellow, Royal Society of the UK
- 2019 Peak Scholar, University of Calgary
- 2018 Killam Research Excellence Award
- 2018 Order of the University of Calgary
- 2017 David Grahame Award, Electrochemical Society Inc.
- 2016 Highlighted in ‘Successful Women Ceramic and Glass Scientists and Engineers, p. 13-18, Edited by Lynnette D. Madsen, Wiley
- 2014 Honorary Professor, University of Science and Technology, Beijing
- 2014 China Distinguished Materials Scientist, Univ. of Science and Technology Beijing
- 2012 Featured in U of Calgary promotional video (‘Eyes High – Reaching the Community’)
- 2011 Fellow, Royal Society of Canada
- 2010 Finalist for Outstanding Leadership in Alberta Technology (ASTECH Award)
- 2007 Awardee (Women’s Resource Center, U. of Calgary) for outstanding achievements as a research scientist, student supervisor, and mentor
- 2007 Fellow, Electrochemical Society Inc.
- 2006 Top 40 Alumni in the last 40 years, University of Calgary, 2006
- 2004 - 2018 Tier I CRC, Fuel Cells and Related Energy Applications
- 2005 NSF ADVANCE Distinguished Lectureship, Cleveland, Ohio
- 2003-2005 Honeywell Foundation Research Award
- 2002 Killam Resident Research Fellowship, University of Calgary
- 1998 CIC Lecture Award, University of Sherbrooke, Quebec
- 1996 Fellow, Canadian Society for Chemistry
- 1995 Faculty of Science, University of Calgary, Excellence in Research Award
- 1994 YWCA Woman of Distinction Award in Science and Technology, Calgary
- 1993 C. Benson Award, Canadian Society for Chemistry, Inaugural Recipient
- 1986 W. Lash Miller Award in Electrochemistry, Electrochemical Soc. Inc. (Canadian Section)
- 1985 Electrochemical Society W. Lash Miller Award

She is a Fellow of the Royal Society (UK), Royal Society of Canada, the Chemical Institute of Canada and the Electrochemical Society.

=== Selected publications ===
Her publications include:

- Birss, Viola (2024). "Energetics and Redox Kinetics of Pure Ferrocene-Terminated N-Heterocyclic Carbene Self-Assembled Monolayers on Gold". Langmuir : the ACS journal of surfaces and colloids. 40 (33): 17367–17377. doi:10.1021/acs.langmuir.4c01446. PMID 39106183.
- Birss, Viola (2022). "Hydrophobic nanoporous carbon scaffolds reveal the origin of polarity-dependent electrocapillary imbibition". Chemical science. 14 (6): 1372–1385. doi:10.1039/d2sc05705k. PMID 36794181.
- Birss, Viola (2022). "Deciphering the Interaction of Single-Phase La0.3Sr0.7Fe0.7Cr0.3O3-δ with CO2/CO Environments for Application in Reversible Solid Oxide Cells". ACS applied materials & interfaces. 14 (11): 13388–13399. doi:10.1021/acsami.2c00857. PMID 35274931.

Birss serves as associate editor of the Journal of Materials Chemistry A.
