= Trumpism =

American right-wing to far-right populist political ideology

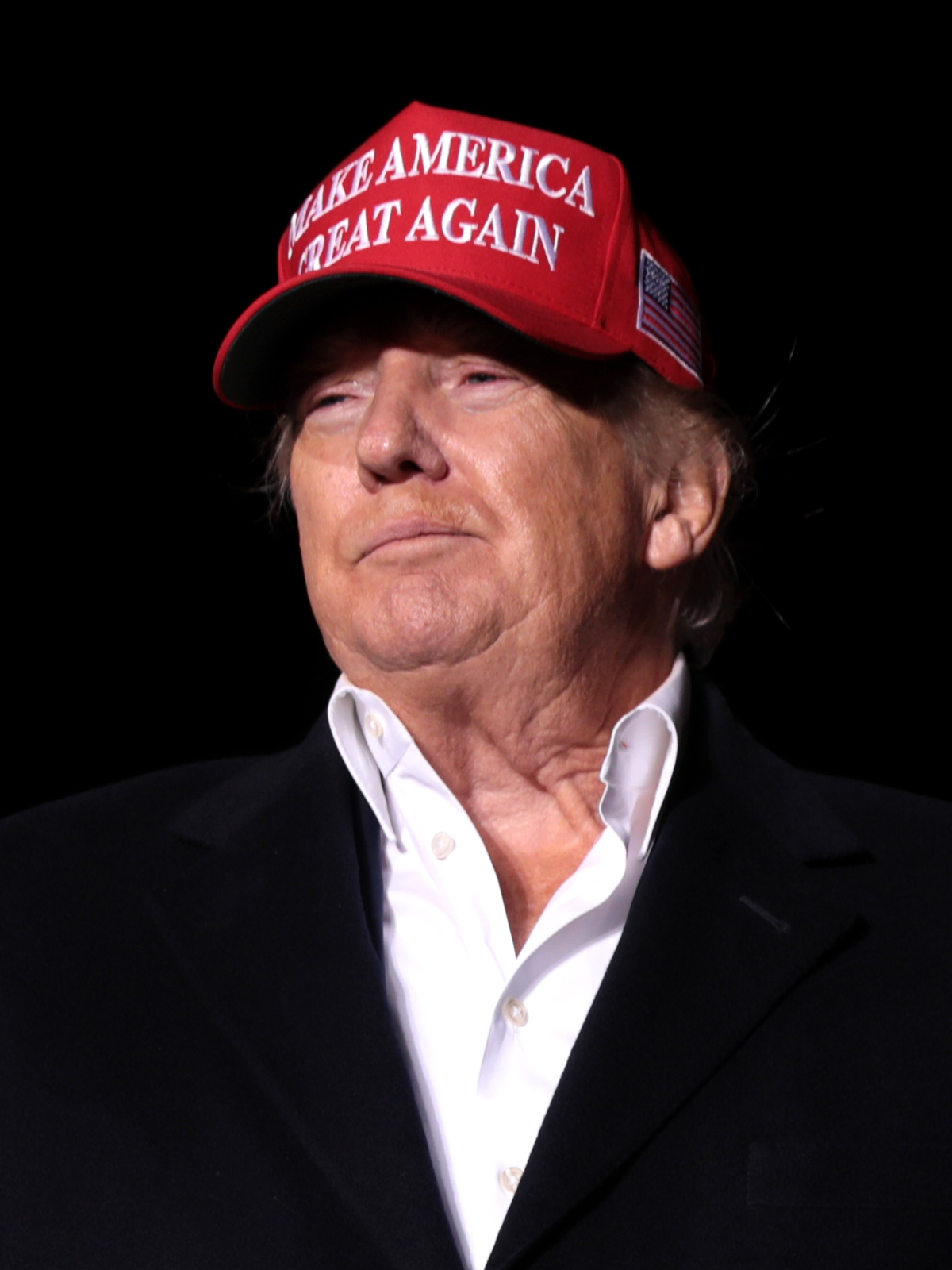
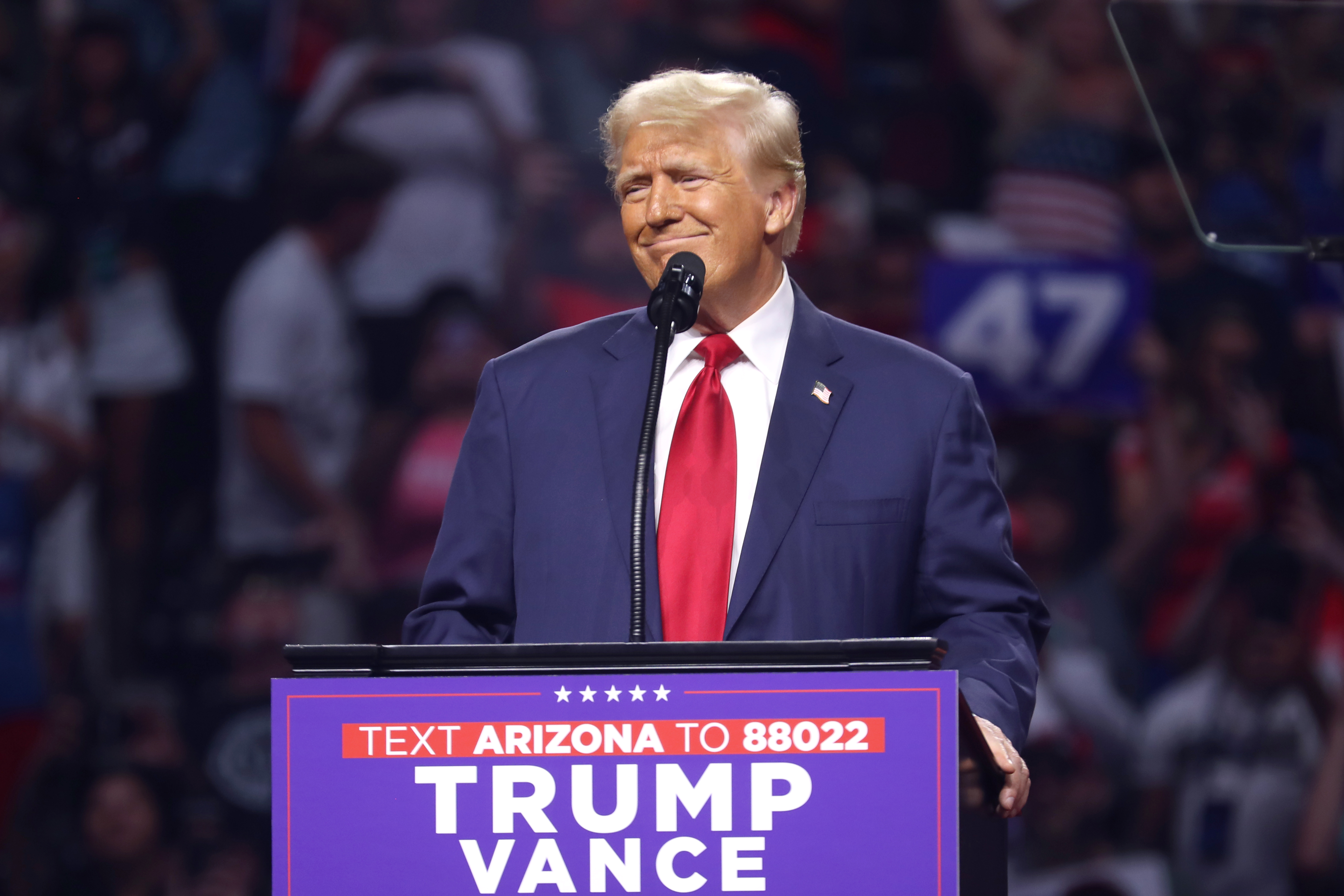
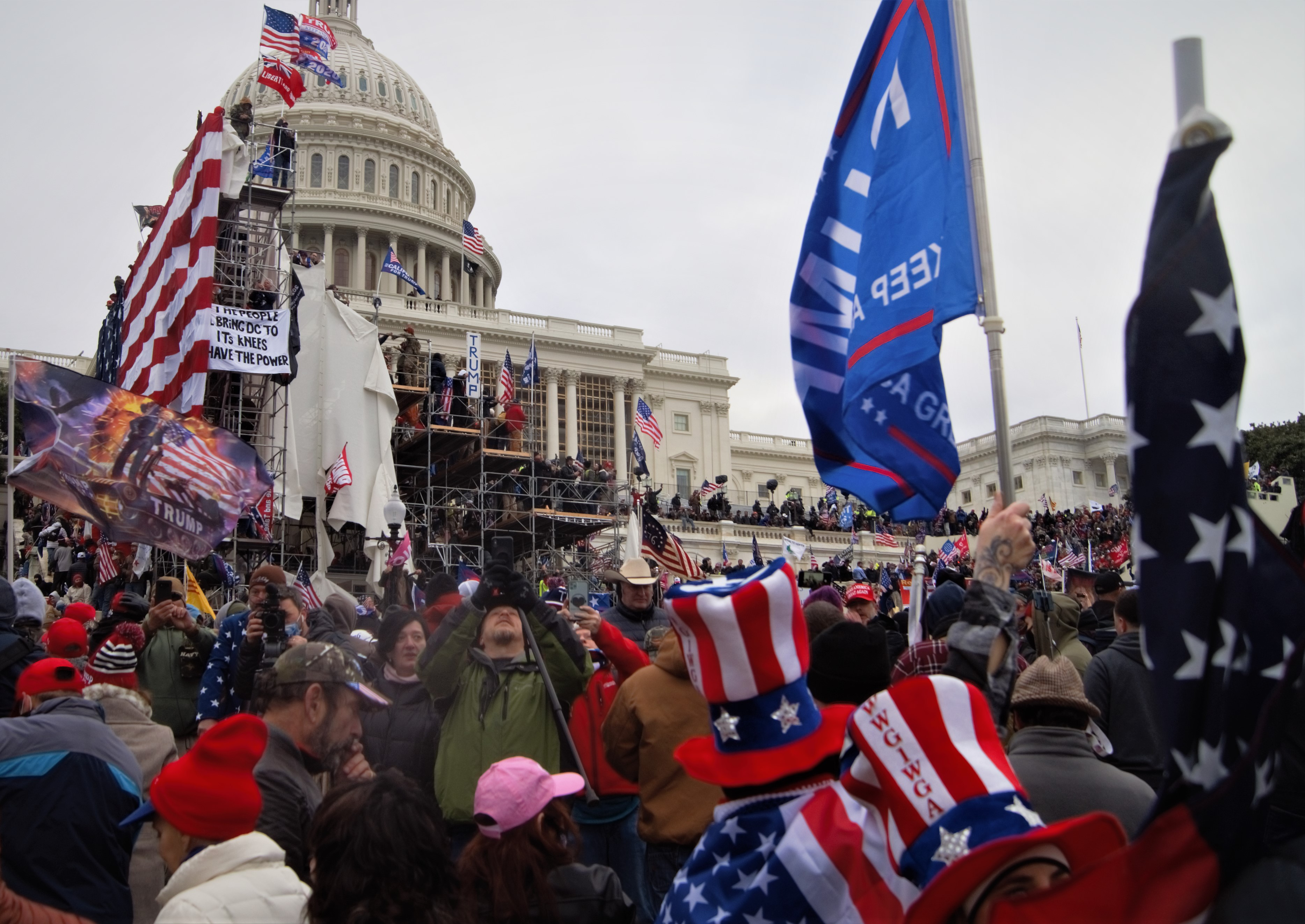
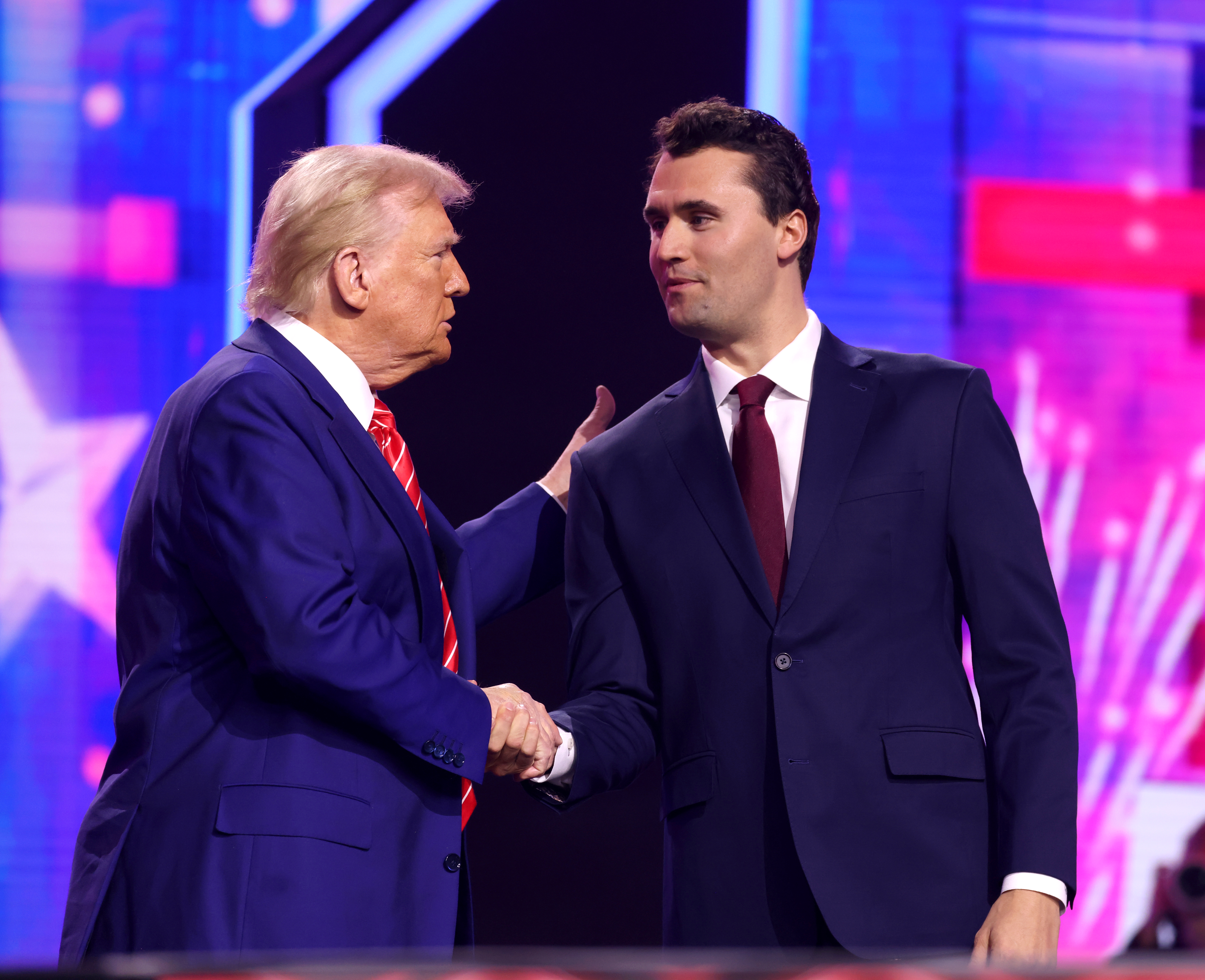
- From left to right, top to bottom: Trump wearing a MAGA hat at a rally in 2022; Trump at a 2024 campaign rally in Arizona; Trump supporters storming the Capitol Building on January 6, 2021; Trump with TPUSA founder Charlie Kirk, one of Trump's closest allies, in 2024
- Leader: Donald Trump
- Founder: Donald Trump
- Founded: June 16, 2015; 11 years ago
- Ideology: Right-wing populism; Authoritarianism; Business nationalism; American neo-nationalism; Right-wing antiglobalism; Nativism (US); Economic nationalism; Anti-intellectualism; Neo-fascism (debated) (Note: Books and journal articles: Cox & O'Connor 2025, p. 1: "This debate has unfolded in stark binary terms of presence or absence. Alarmists argue that Trumpism bears all of the hallmarks of fascism and should therefore be labelled as such. Sceptics suggest that this conclusion is premised on shallow historical analogizing that mistakes form for substance... although Trumpism does not conform to inter-war European iterations of fascism, and while the conditions under which they emerged are strikingly different, Trumpism nonetheless exhibits fascistic tendencies that have intensified in recent years. We refer to this as 'proto-fascism', and suggest that neoliberal capitalism has been centrally implicated in its emergence."; Jackson 2021; Maher 2023, p. 393; McGaughey 2018: "Trump is closely linked to neo-conservative politics. It is too hostile to insider welfare to be called 'fascist'. Its political ideology is weaker. If we had to give it a name, the social ideal of Donald Trump is 'fascism-lite'."; Tourish 2024; DiMaggio 2021; Opinion pieces: Homans 2024: "No major American presidential candidate has talked like he now does at his rallies—not Richard Nixon, not George Wallace, not even Donald Trump himself."; Bender & Gold 2023; Lehmann 2023; Basu 2023; Cassidy 2023; Lutz 2023; Browning 2023; Kim & Ibssa 2023; Ward 2024: "It's a stark escalation over the last month of what some experts in political rhetoric, fascism, and immigration say is a strong echo of authoritarians and Nazi ideology."; Applebaum 2024: "In the 2024 campaign, that line has been crossed. ... The deliberate dehumanization of whole groups of people; the references to police, to violence, to the 'bloodbath' that Trump has said will unfold if he doesn't win; the cultivation of hatred not only against immigrants but also against political opponents—none of this has been used successfully in modern American politics. But neither has this rhetoric been tried in modern American politics."; Rubin 2024; Brooks 2024: "Trump, however, has also used the term fascist to describe Harris as he has doubled down on his insults against Harris and ratcheted up the intensity of his own rhetoric against political opponents. 'She's a marxist, communist, fascist, socialist', Trump said at a rally in Arizona in September. Johnson and McConnell made no mention of Trump's rhetoric in their statement, keeping the focus on their political rival."; Schmidt 2024; Balk 2024); Factions: National conservatism; Paleoconservatism; Christian nationalism (US); Ultraconservatism
- Political position: Right-wing to far-right
- National affiliation: Republican Party; Freedom Caucus (factions)
- Slogan: Make America Great Again

Trumpism is the political ideology behind Donald Trump, the 45th and 47th president of the United States, and his political base. It is often used in close conjunction with the Make America Great Again (MAGA) political movement. It comprises ideologies such as right-wing populism, right-wing antiglobalism, national conservatism, Christian nationalism, neo-nationalism and illiberalism, and features significant authoritarian and autocratic beliefs and practices. (Note: Attributed to multiple sources: LeVine & Arnsdorf 2023; Bender & Gold 2023; Baker 2023; Arnsdorf, Dawsey & Barrett 2023; Colvin & Barrow 2023; Stone 2023; Beinart 2019; Breslin 2021; Baker 2022; Gessen 2020) Other ideologies include nativism, economic nationalism, anti-environmentalism, interventionism, and anti-intellectualism. Trumpists and Trumpians are terms that refer to individuals exhibiting its characteristics. There has been significant academic debate on-going over the prevalence of alt-right and neo-fascist elements of Trumpism.

Trumpism has been characterized by scholars as having authoritarian leanings, and has been associated with the belief that the president is above the rule of law. (Note: Attributed to multiple sources: Havercroft et al. 2018; Fassassi 2020; Strauss 2019, p. 440: "what has been for me the disturbing trend toward essentially unchecked presidential exercise of authority: Reagan presidency (Strauss, 1986) Clinton presidency (Strauss, 1997), Bush II presidency (Strauss, 2007), Obama Presidency (Strauss, 2015). With President Trump, this trend has, if anything, accelerated."; Darby 2024; Lusane 2024) It has been referred to as an American political variant of the populist, radical right and the far-right, as well as the national-populist and neo-nationalist sentiment seen in multiple nations starting in the mid–late 2010s. Trump's political base has been compared to a cult of personality. (Note: Attributed to multiple sources: Sundahl 2022; Franks & Hesami 2021; Adams 2021; Reyes 2020; Goldsmith & Moen 2024; Diamond 2023: "The cult of Trumpism fosters and exploits paranoia and allegiance to an all-powerful, charismatic figure, contributing to a social milieu at risk for the erosion of democratic principles and the rise of fascism."; Hassan 2019; Butler 2020; Haltiwanger 2021; Tharoor 2022; Ben-Ghiat 2020)

Over the course of the late 2010s and early 2020s, Trump supporters became the largest faction of the Republican Party, with the remainder often characterized as "the elite", "the establishment", or "Republican in name only" (RINO) in contrast. In response to these developments, many American conservatives opposed to Trumpism formed the Never Trump movement which opposes Trump and his political practices, often advocating to achieve a more traditional Republican Party. After Trump's victory in 2024, many of them were either defeated in primaries or left voiceless.

== Background and context ==
Some political scientists have attempted to explain support for Trumpism from a societal perspective and in the broader context of a wave of right-wing populism that came to prominence in the 2010s, underpinning Brexit and Trump's 2016 election. Theories cited by scholars include the "left behind" thesis that posits that the rise of right-wing populism in the West finds its roots in individuals or communities that feel that they have been neglected by the development of society and political decision-makers. Trends of globalization and deindustrialization have been identified by scholars as having contributed to economic and social deprivation that underpins this theorized phenomenon. (Note: Examples of what has been termed "left behind places" include La France périphérique (peripheral France), abgehängte Regionen (suspended regions) in Germany, Aree Interne (inner areas) in Italy, Krimpgebieden [nl] (shrinkage areas) in the Netherlands, la España vaciada [es] (the hollowed out Spain), and the Rust Belt in the United States.)

Some American scholars characterize the left behind thesis as a growing divergence between so-called "brain hubs" and "superstar cities" at one extreme and former manufacturing cities that have lost jobs and residents at the other. Others characterize the problem as being a divergence between regions that have enjoyed the benefits of globalization and technological advance and those that have borne the brunt of disruptive impacts related to these phenomena. A contested characterization of the left behind thesis is as a cultural backlash to long-term structural changes in gender equality, urban growth, education, immigration, economic instability, and terrorist attacks. The left behind theory has been supported and disputed by scholars and empirical research.

Eric Kaufmann's Whiteshift (Note: Kaufmann defines Whiteshift as "a process by which white majorities absorb an admixture of different peoples through intermarriage, but remain oriented around existing myths of descent, symbols and traditions".) describes a Western societal trend in the 21st century that he says is perceived to be eroding white ethnic identity. (Note: Kaufmann characterized this as "a set of myths and symbols to which people are attached" similar to other ethnic identities. According to Kaufmann, this demographic process is inevitable even without immigration due to the rates of intermarriage occurring in many Western countries.) He argues that Whiteshift and a progressive trope celebrating the projected demise of white majorities have been responsible for much of the reactionary populism since 2015. Kaufmann's thesis was criticised by Kenan Malik for omitting social context that Malik asserts is key to understanding politics.

== Themes ==
Trumpism emerged during Trump's 2016 presidential campaign. Trump's rhetoric has its roots in a populist political method that suggests nationalistic answers to political, economic, and social problems. They are more specifically described as right-wing populist. Policies include immigration restrictionism, trade protectionism, isolationism, and opposition to entitlement reform.

Former national security advisor and close Trump advisor John Bolton disputes that Trumpism exists in any meaningful sense, adding that "[t]he man does not have a philosophy. And people can try [to] draw lines between the dots of his decisions. They will fail." Writing for the Routledge Handbook of Global Populism (2019), Olivier Jutel notes, "What Donald Trump reveals is that the various iterations of right-wing American populism have less to do with a programmatic social conservatism or libertarian economics than with enjoyment."

Trump has been described as a demagogue, and there exists a significant scholarly study on the use of demagogy and related themes within Trumpism. Trump explicitly and routinely disparages racial, religious, and ethnic minorities, and scholars consistently find that racial animus regarding blacks, immigrants, and Muslims are the best predictors of support for Trump. Trumpist rhetoric heavily features anti-immigrant, xenophobic, and nativist attacks against minority groups. Other identified aspects include conspiracist, isolationist, Christian nationalist, evangelical Christian, protectionist, anti-feminist, and anti-LGBTQ beliefs.

=== Grievance ===
Sociologist Michael Kimmel states that Trump's populism is "an emotion. And the emotion is righteous indignation that the government is screwing 'us.'" Kimmel posits that Trump manifests "aggrieved entitlement", a "sense that those benefits to which you believed yourself entitled have been snatched away from you by unseen forces larger and more powerful. You feel yourself to be the heir to a great promise, the American Dream, which has turned into an impossible fantasy ..."

=== Vagueness ===
Communications scholar Zizi Papacharissi explains the utility of being ideologically vague and using terms and slogans that can mean anything the supporter wants them to mean. "When these publics thrive in affective engagement it's because they've found an affective hook that's built around an open signifier that they get to use and reuse and re-employ ... MAGA; that's an open signifier ... it allows them all to assign different meanings to it. So MAGA works for connecting publics that are different, because it is open enough to permit people to ascribe their own meaning to it." (Note: Papacharissi notes that examples can also be found on the left for the use of open signifiers when affectively engaging their bases ("publics").)

Exit polling data suggests the campaign was successful at mobilizing the "white disenfranchised", the lower- to working-class European-Americans who are experiencing growing social inequality and who often have stated opposition to the American political establishment.

Some prominent conservatives formed a Never Trump movement, seen as a rebellion of conservative elites against the base.

=== Right-wing authoritarian populism ===
Asked: Are there limits on your global power?

Yeah, there is one thing. My own morality. My own mind. It's the only thing that can stop me. I don't need international law. I'm not looking to hurt people.

— Donald Trump, January 7, 2026

New York Times White House correspondents wrote that "Mr. Trump's assessment ... was the most blunt acknowledgment yet of his worldview. At its core is the concept that national strength, rather than laws, treaties and conventions, should be the deciding factor as powers collide."

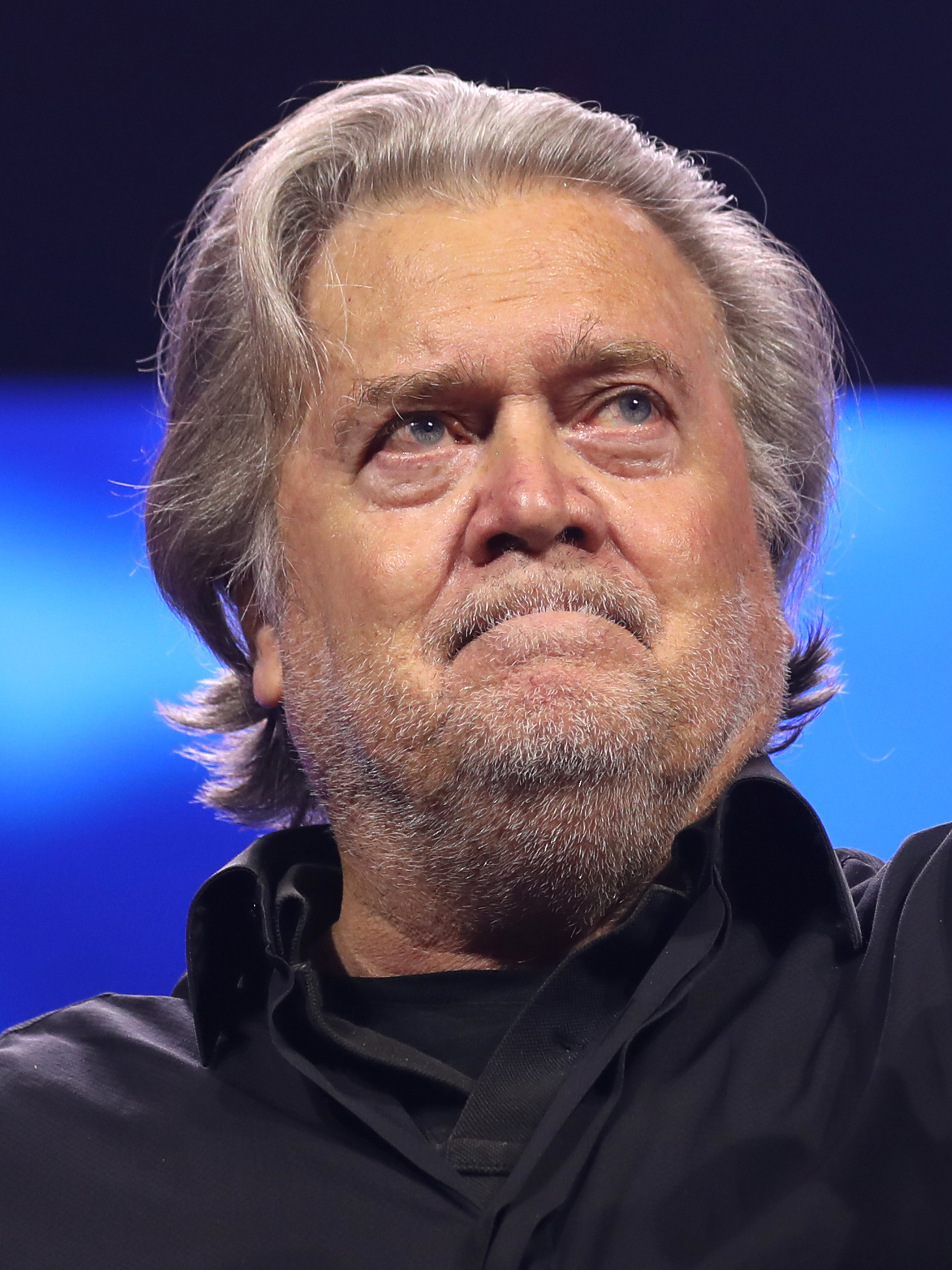
Former Chief Strategist for the first Trump administration Steve Bannon supported many national populist political movements including creating a network of far-right groups in Europe.

Trumpism has been described as right-wing authoritarian populist, and is broadly seen among scholars as posing an existential threat to American democracy. His presidency sparked renewed focus and research on restraining presidential power and the threats of a criminal presidency that had died down since the Nixon administration. Trump advocated for an extreme position of unitary executive theory, arguing that Article II gave him the right to "do whatever I want". The theory is a maximalist interpretation of presidential power formulated during the Reagan administration and pushed by the Federalist Society to undo post-Nixon reforms. Future presidents ran with "unitary-adjacent ideas" and aspects of theory held bipartisan support as part of the growing powers of the presidency. In February 2025, Trump wrote and pinned a comment on Truth Social and X: "He who saves his Country does not violate any Law", which the White House later reposted on X that day. The phrase itself is a variation of one attributed to Napoleon Bonaparte, and was noted to be in line with his administration's aggressive push for expanding presidential power under the theory.

Yale sociologist Philip S. Gorski warned against the threat of Trumpism, writing that

"the election of Donald Trump constitutes perhaps the greatest threat to American democracy since the Japanese attack on Pearl Harbor. There is a real and growing danger that representative government will be slowly but effectively supplanted by a populist form of authoritarian rule in the years to come. Media intimidation, mass propaganda, voter suppression, court packing, and even armed paramilitaries—many of the necessary and sufficient conditions for an authoritarian devolution are gradually falling into place."

Some academics regard such authoritarian backlash as a feature of liberal democracies. Disputing the view that the surge of support for Trumpism and Brexit is a new phenomenon, political scientist Karen Stenner and social psychologist Jonathan Haidt state that

the far-right populist wave ... did not in fact come out of nowhere. It is not a sudden madness, or virus, or tide, or even just a copycat phenomenon—the emboldening of bigots and despots by others' electoral successes. Rather, it is something that sits just beneath the surface of any human society—including in the advanced liberal democracies at the heart of the Western world—and can be activated by core elements of liberal democracy itself.

Stenner and Haidt regard authoritarian waves as a feature of liberal democracies, noting that the findings of their 2016 study of Trump and Brexit supporters was not unexpected. They wrote:

... normative threat tends either to leave non-authoritarians utterly unmoved by the things that catalyze authoritarians or to propel them toward being (what one might conceive as) their 'best selves.' In previous investigations, this has seen non-authoritarians move toward positions of greater tolerance and respect for diversity under the very conditions that seem to propel authoritarians toward increasing intolerance.

Author and authoritarianism critic Masha Gessen contrasted the "democratic" strategy of the Republican establishment making policy arguments appealing to the public, with the "autocratic" strategy of appealing to an "audience of one" in Donald Trump. Gessen noted the fear of Republicans that Trump would endorse a primary election opponent or otherwise use his political power to undermine any fellow party members that he felt had betrayed him.

The 2020 Republican Party platform simply endorsed "the President's America-first agenda", prompting comparisons to contemporary leader-focused party platforms in Russia and China. In January 2025, a CNN-SSRS poll found that 53% of Republicans viewed loyalty to Trump as central to their political identity and very important to what being a Republican is, beating values such as "a less powerful federal government (46%), supporting congressional Republicans (42%) or opposing Democratic policies (32%)".

Trumpism has been described as borrowing from the anti-parliamentarian political theory advocated by Carl Schmitt, and has received renewed attention as a historical reference.

=== Gender and masculinity ===
Google Trends search term for "Toxic masculinity" began a substantial increase in 2016, at the time of the campaign for the U.S. presidential election.

After the December 2020 introduction of COVID vaccines, a partisan gap in death rates developed, indicating the effects of vaccine skepticism. As of March 2024, more than 30 percent of Republicans had not received a COVID vaccine, compared with less than 10 percent of Democrats. Aversion to wearing masks has been associated with Trumpism's celebration of masculinity.

According to Philip Gorski, in Trumpian nostalgia, "decline is brought about by docility and femininity and the return to greatness requires little more than a reassertion of dominance and masculinity. In this way, 'virtue' is reduced to its root etymology of manly bravado." Michael Kimmel describes male Trump supporters who despaired "over whether or not anything could enable them to find a place with some dignity in this new, multicultural, and more egalitarian world. ... These men were angry, but they all looked back nostalgically to a time when their sense of masculine entitlement went unchallenged. They wanted to reclaim their country, restore their rightful place in it, and retrieve their manhood in the process."

Social psychologists Theresa Vescio and Nathaniel Schermerhorn note that "In his 2016 presidential campaign, Trump embodied HM [hegemonic masculinity] while waxing nostalgic for a racially homogenous past that maintained an unequal gender order. Trump performed HM by repeatedly referencing his status as a successful businessman ("blue-collar businessman") and alluding to how tough he would be as president. ... Trump was openly hostile to gender-atypical women, objectified gender-typical women, and mocked the masculinity of male peers and opponents." In their studies involving 2,007 people, they found that endorsement of hegemonic masculinity better predicted support for Trump than other factors, such as support for anti-establishment, anti-elitist, nativist, racist, sexist, homophobic, or xenophobic perspectives.

Kimmel was surprised at the sexual turn the 2016 election took and thinks that Trump is, for many men, a fantasy figure, an uber-male free to indulge every desire. "Many of these guys feel that the current order of things has emasculated them, by which I mean it has taken away their ability to support a family and have [a] great life. Here's a guy who says: 'I can build anything I want. I can do anything I want. I can have the women I want.' They're going, 'This guy is awesome!'"

Gender role scholar Colleen Clemens describes toxic masculinity as "a narrow and repressive description of manhood, designating manhood as defined by violence, sex, status and aggression ... where strength is everything while emotions are a weakness; where sex and brutality are yardsticks by which men are measured, while supposedly 'feminine' traits—which can range from emotional vulnerability to simply not being hypersexual—are the means by which your status as "man" can be taken away." Writing in the Journal of Human Rights, Kimberly Theidon notes the COVID-19 pandemic's irony of Trumpian toxic masculinity: "Being a tough guy means wearing the mask of masculinity: Being a tough guy means refusing to don a mask that might preserve one's life and the lives of others."

Tough guy bravado appeared on the internet prior to the attack on Congress on January 6, 2021, with one poster writing, "Be ready to fight. Congress needs to hear glass breaking, doors being kicked in ... . Get violent. Stop calling this a march, or rally, or a protest. Go there ready for war. We get our President or we die." Of the rioters arrested for the attack on the U.S. Capitol, 88% were men, and 67% were 35 years or older. (Note: The 88% figure is based on the CBS news report that as of April 16, 2021, 45 out of the 370 arrested were arrested were women.)

Opposition to transgender rights is a theme of Trumpism.

=== Christian Trumpism ===
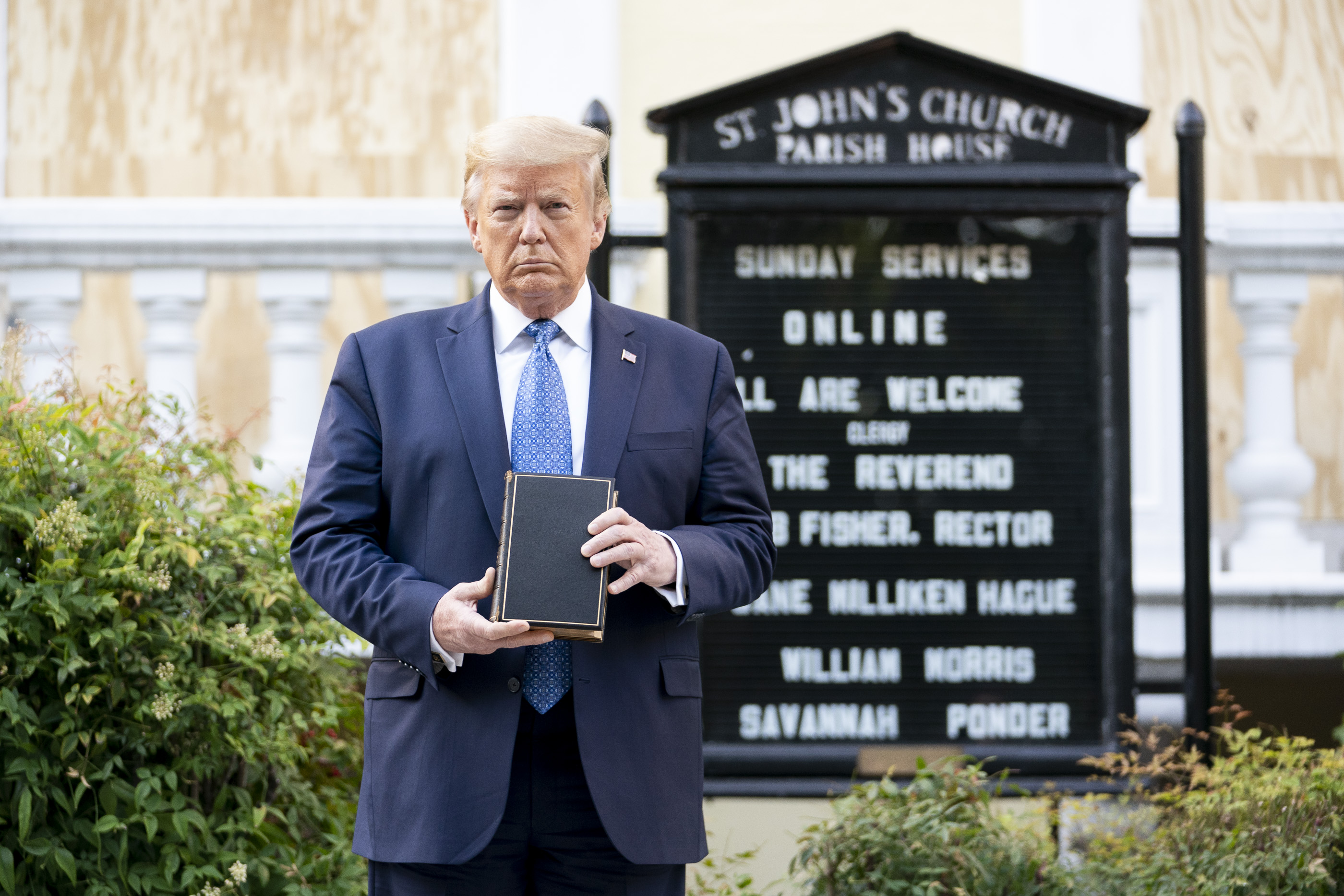
During the 2020 George Floyd protests, Trump held a photo-op at St. John's Episcopal Church, which had been defaced the night before. Law enforcement controversially cleared a path, using riot control tactics, for Trump to walk from the White House to the church. For more information, see Donald Trump photo op at St. John's Church.

Donald Trump has strong support among white evangelical Christians, particularly among those who do not attend church regularly. Trump also maintains strong support with Christian nationalists, and his rallies take on the symbols, rhetoric and agenda of Christian nationalism. Trump described his 2024 presidential campaign as a "righteous crusade" against "atheists, globalists and the Marxists".

Some Christian Trump supporters view him as divinely ordained and "chosen by God", and some compare him to Jesus, with opposition to him seen as spiritual warfare. Trump shared and played a video entitled "God Made Trump" at several of his rallies explicitly comparing him to a messianic figure in religious terms. Trump is frequently described among some of his Christian supporters as an Old Testament hero, with Cyrus the Great or David frequently mentioned. The New York Times describes his supporters seeing him as one of several "morally flawed figures handpicked by God to lead profound missions aimed at achieving overdue justice or resisting existential evil". This framing has been described as "vessel theology" which allows for support of Trump and excuses his prior sexual misconduct and adultery. Trump has strong support with members of the dominionist New Apostolic Reformation, and many Trump administration officials are aligned with the group.

== Methods of persuasion ==
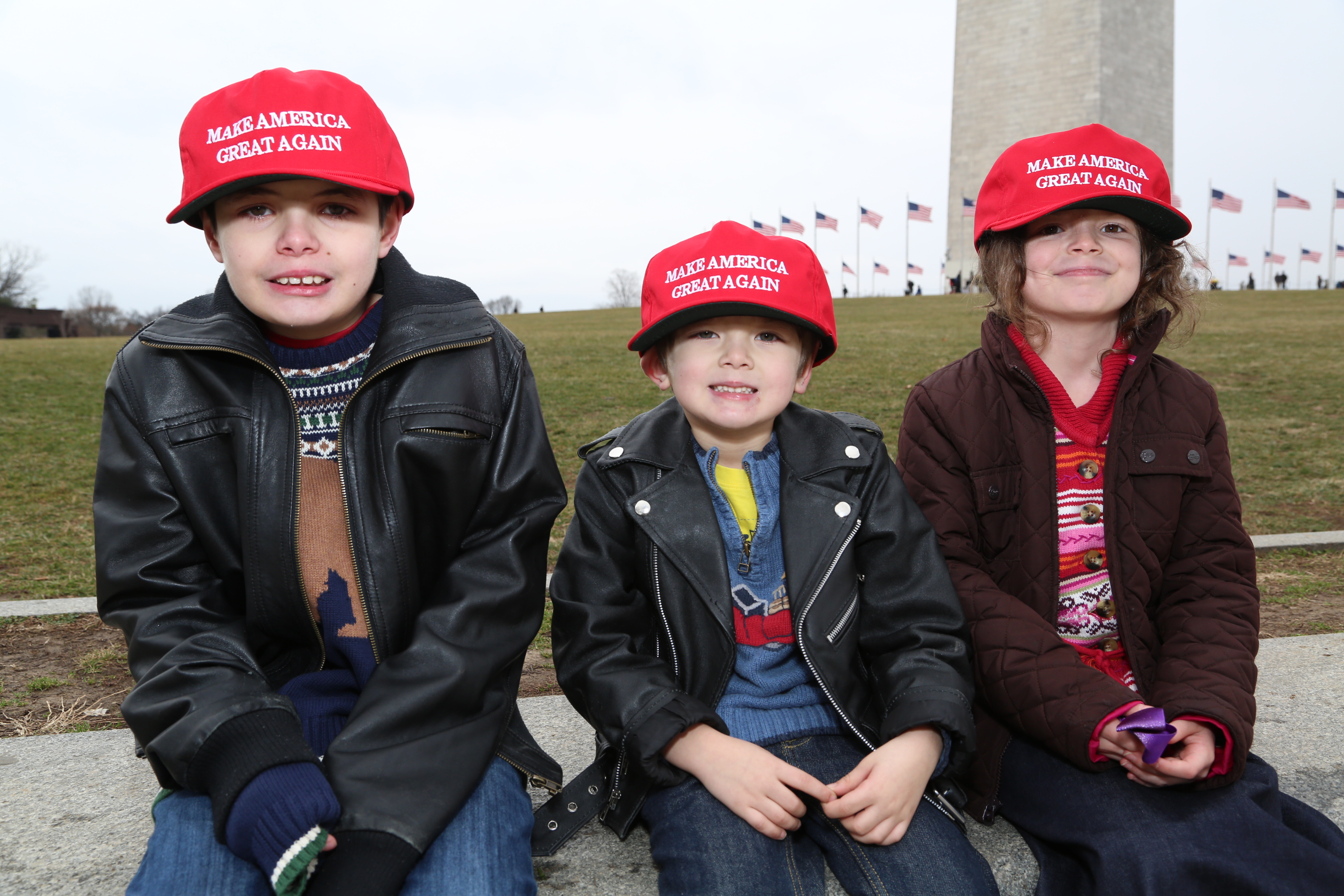
Children wearing "Make America Great Again" hats at the 2017 inauguration, a theme earlier established by Reagan to elicit a sense of restoration of hope

Sociologist Arlie Hochschild writes that Trump's "speeches—evoking dominance, bravado, clarity, national pride, and personal uplift—inspire an emotional transformation" in followers, deeply resonating with their "emotional self-interest". Hochschild states that Trump is an "emotions candidate", appealing to the emotional self-interests of voters. To Hochschild, this explains the paradox raised by Thomas Frank's book What's the Matter with Kansas?, an anomaly which motivated her five-year immersive research into the emotional dynamics of the Tea Party movement which she believes has mutated into Trumpism.

Her book Strangers in Their Own Land was named one of the "6 books to understand Trump's Win" by The New York Times. Hochschild claims that voters were not persuaded by rhetoric to vote against their self-interest through appeals to the "bad angels" of their nature: (Note: A reference to a metaphor found at the close of U.S. President Abraham Lincoln's first inaugural address. Cognitive scientist Steven Pinker explains the impact of these appeals in his book The Better Angels of Our Nature.) "their greed, selfishness, racial intolerance, homophobia, and desire to get out of paying taxes that go to the unfortunate." She grants that the appeal to bad angels is made by Trump, but states that it "obscures another—to the right wing's good angels—their patience in waiting in line in scary economic times, their capacity for loyalty, sacrifice, and endurance", qualities she describes as a part of a motivating narrative she calls their "deep story", a social contract narrative that appears to be widely shared in other countries as well. She thinks Trump's approach towards his audience creates group cohesiveness by exploiting a crowd phenomenon Emile Durkheim called "collective effervescence", "a state of emotional excitation felt by those who join with others they take to be fellow members of a moral or biological tribe ... to affirm their unity and, united, they feel secure and respected." (Note: For a detailed description of this evocation of intense collective emotions in order to engineer group identity, see Cui 2018. Cui writes: "The collective emotions that audiences feel during media events is the modern day equivalent of the collective effervescence in totemic worship (Dayan & Katz, 1992). In primitive societies, intense feelings about the collectivity are generated through the participants physically enacting rituals together. Possessed by these intense feelings, they experience themselves as sharing the collective identity represented by the symbolism in the rituals. In sophisticated industrial societies, people often participate in rituals through the media. Through the live broadcast of ceremonial events, a geographically dispersed population can be temporally synchronized through the symbolic representation of a higher reality. The intense collective emotions these events generate reinforce social identity (Jiménez-Martínez, 2014; Uimonen, 2015; Widholm, 2016).")

Trumpian rhetoric employs absolutist framings and threat narratives rejecting the political establishment. The absolutist rhetoric emphasizes non-negotiable boundaries and moral outrage at their supposed violation. (Note: Trump's scenic construction (introduction of characters and setting stage depicting an issue) use black and white terms to describe malevolent forces, or the coming victory. John Kerry is a "total disaster" and Obamacare would "destroy American health care forever"; Kenneth Burke referred to this "all or none" staging as characteristic of "burlesque" rhetoric. Instead of a world involving a variety of complex situations requiring nuanced solutions acceptable to a multiplicity of interested groups, for the agitator the world is a simple stage populated by two irreconcilable groups and dramatic action involves decisions with simple either-or choices. Because all players and issues are painted using black and white terms, there is no possibility of working out a common solution.)

=== Money-Kyrle pattern ===
"Stopping" people
you have nothing in common with

And if you don't stop people that you've never seen before, that you have nothing in common with, your country is going to fail. ... This double-tailed monster [of green energy and immigration] destroys everything in its wake, and they cannot let that happen any longer. You're doing it because you want to be nice, you want to be politically correct, and you're destroying your heritage.

— President Donald Trump
to the UN General Assembly,
September 23, 2025

A particular pattern is common for authoritarian movements. First, elicit a sense of depression, humiliation and victimhood. Second, separate the world into two opposing groups: a demonized set of others versus those who have the power and will to overcome them. This involves identifying the enemy supposedly causing the current state of affairs and then promoting conspiracy theories and fearmongering to inflame fear and anger. After cycling these first two patterns through the populace, the final message aims to produce a cathartic release of pent-up ochlocracy and mob energy, with a promise that salvation is at hand because the leader will deliver the nation back to its former glory. This three-part pattern was identified in 1932 by Roger Money-Kyrle who wrote Psychology of Propaganda. Reporting on Trumpist rallies has documented expressions of the Money-Kyrle pattern and associated stagecraft.

=== Trump rallies ===
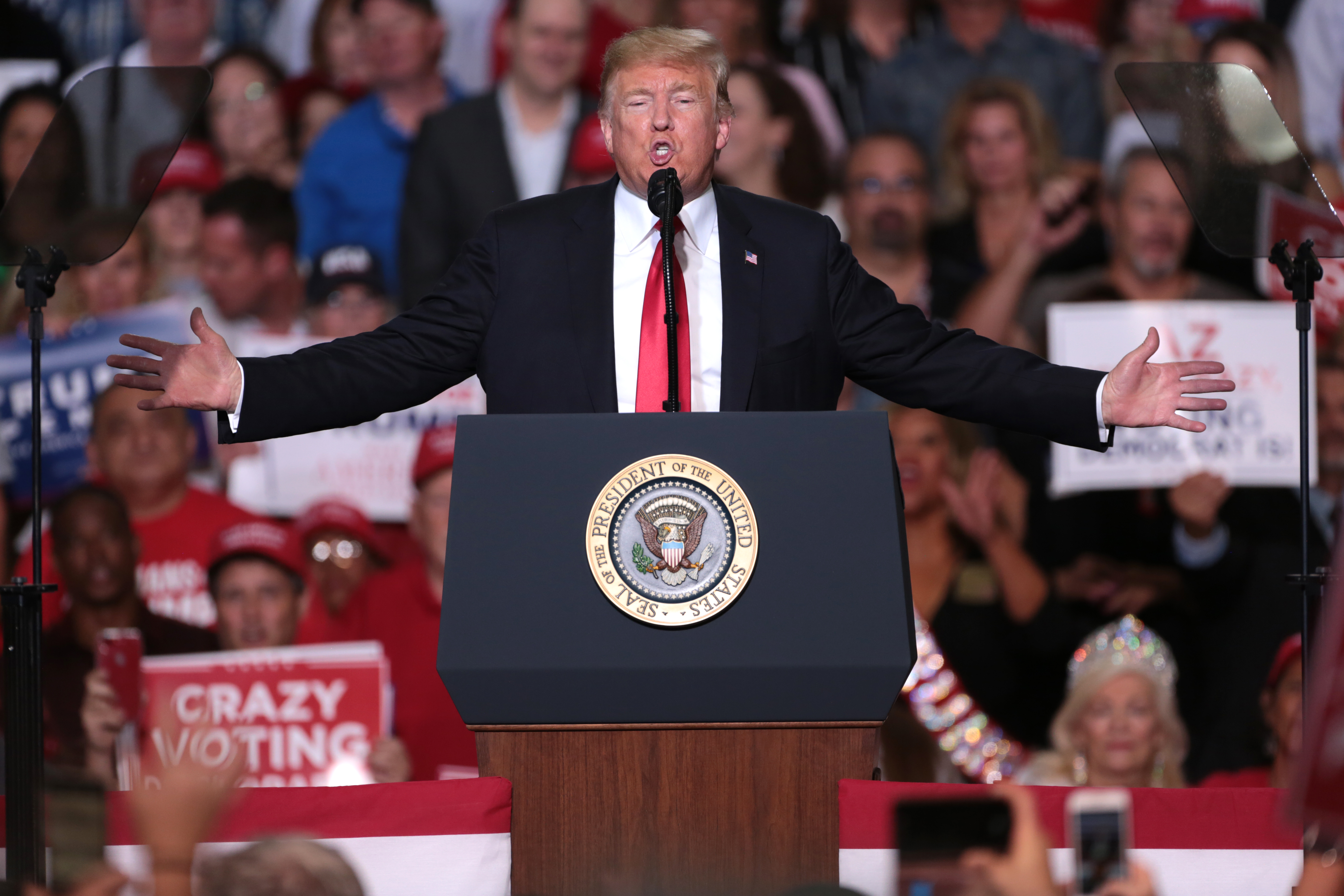
Trump at a Make America Great Again rally in Arizona, 2018

Critical theory scholar Douglas Kellner compares the elaborate staging of Leni Riefenstahl's Triumph of the Will with that used in Trump rallies using the example of the preparation of photo op sequences and aggressive hyping of huge attendance expected for Trump's 2015 primary event in Mobile, Alabama, when the media coverage repeatedly cuts between the Trump jet circling the stadium, the rising excitement of rapturous admirers below, the motorcade and the final triumphal entrance of the individual Kellner claims is being presented as the "political savior to help them out with their problems and address their grievances".

Connolly thinks the performance draws energy from the crowd's anger as it channels it, drawing it into a collage of anxieties, frustrations and resentments about malaise themes, such as deindustrialization, offshoring, racial tensions, political correctness, a more humble position for the United States in global security, economics and so on. Connolly observes that animated gestures, pantomiming, facial expressions, strutting and finger pointing are incorporated as part of the theater, transforming the anxiety into anger directed at particular targets, concluding that "each element in a Trump performance flows and folds into the others until an aggressive resonance machine is formed that is more intense than its parts." Some compare the symbiotic dynamics of crowd pleasing to that of the professional wrestling style of events which Trump was involved with since the 1980s.

Some academics point out that the narrative common in the popular press describing the psychology of such crowds is a repetition of a 19th-century theory by Gustave Le Bon when organized crowds were seen by political elites as potential threats to the social order. In his book The Crowd: A Study of the Popular Mind (1895), Le Bon described a sort of collective contagion uniting a crowd into a near religious frenzy, reducing members to barbaric, if not subhuman levels of consciousness with mindless goals. Since such a description depersonalizes supporters, this type of Le Bon analysis is criticized because the would-be defenders of liberal democracy simultaneously are dodging responsibility for investigating grievances while also unwittingly accepting the same us vs. them framing of illiberalism. Connolly acknowledges the risks but considers it more risky to ignore that Trumpian persuasion is successful due to deliberate use of techniques evoking more mild forms of affective contagion.

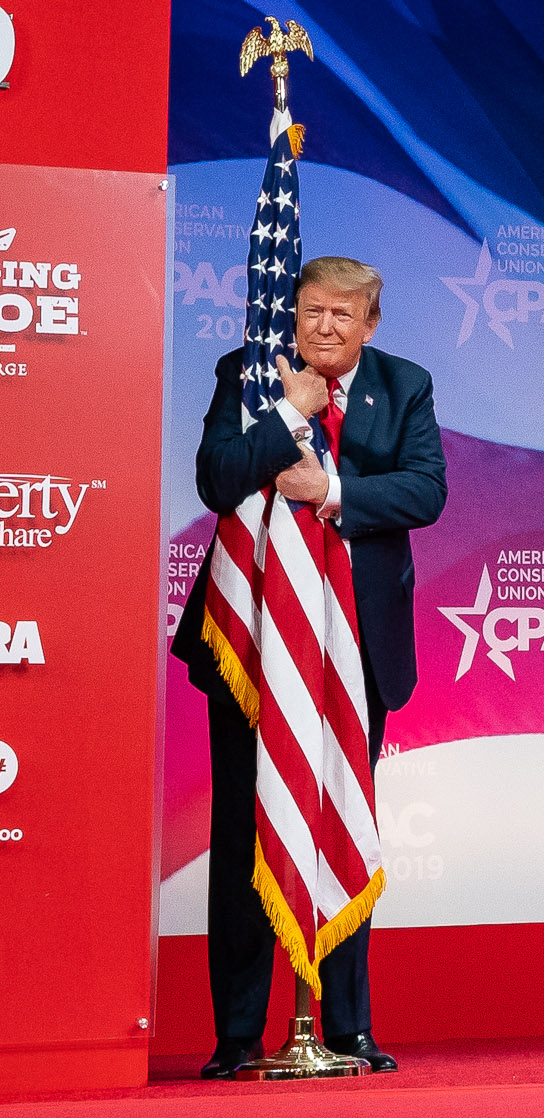
Trump relies on theatrical devices to market his messages, including animated gestures, pantomiming and facial expressions. Photo is from the 2019 Conservative Political Action Conference.

=== Rhetoric ===
A constant barrage of rhetoric rivets media attention while obscuring actions such as neoliberal deregulation. One study concluded that significant environmental deregulation occurred during the first year of the Trump administration but, due to its concurrent use of racist rhetoric, escaped much media attention. According to the authors, the rhetoric served political objectives of dehumanizing its targets, eroding democratic norms, and consolidating power by emotionally connecting with and inflaming resentments among the base of followers and distracted media attention from deregulatory policymaking by igniting media coverage of the distractions.

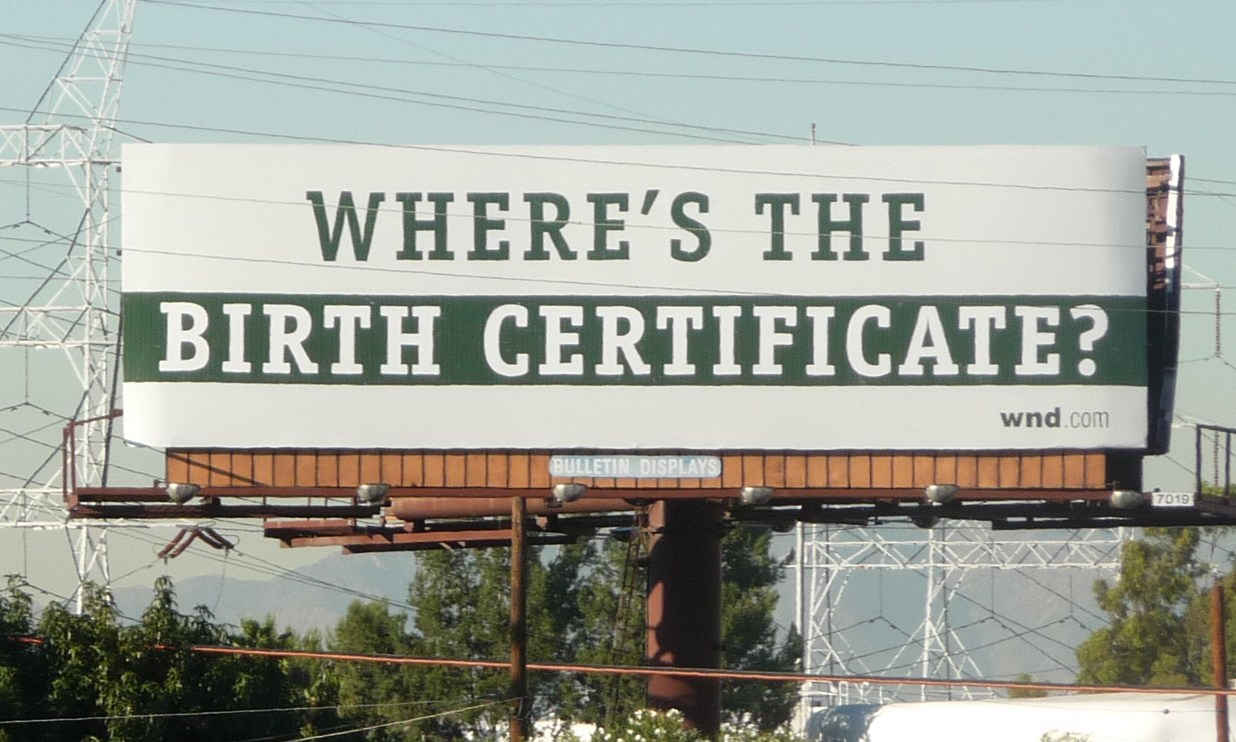
Trump was the most prominent promoter of the birther conspiracy theory used to delegitimize his political rival by employing a political tactic known as the big lie.

According to civil rights lawyer Burt Neuborne and political theorist William E. Connolly, Trumpist rhetoric employs tropes similar to those used by fascists in Germany to persuade citizens (at first a minority) to give up democracy, by using a barrage of falsehoods, half-truths, personal invective, threats, xenophobia, national-security scares, religious bigotry, white racism, exploitation of economic insecurity, and a never-ending search for scapegoats. Neuborne found twenty parallel practices, such as creating what amounts to an "alternate reality" in adherents' minds, through direct communications, by nurturing a fawning mass media and by deriding scientists to erode the notion of objective truth; organizing carefully orchestrated mass rallies; attacking judges when legal cases are lost; using lies, half-truths, insults, vituperation and innuendo to marginalize, demonize and destroy opponents; making jingoistic appeals to ultranationalist fervor; and promising to stop the flow of "undesirable" ethnic groups who are made scapegoats for the nation's ills.

Connolly presents a similar list in his book Aspirational Fascism (2017), adding comparisons of the integration of theatrics and crowd participation with rhetoric, involving grandiose bodily gestures, grimaces, hysterical charges, dramatic repetitions of alternate reality falsehoods, and totalistic assertions incorporated into signature phrases that audiences are encouraged to join in chanting. Despite the similarities, Connolly stresses that Trump is no Nazi but is "an aspirational fascist who pursues crowd adulation, hyperaggressive nationalism, white triumphalism, and militarism, pursues a law-and-order regime giving unaccountable power to the police, and is a practitioner of a rhetorical style that regularly creates fake news and smears opponents to mobilize support for the Big Lies he advances."

In his 2024 book Trump and Hitler: A Comparative Study in Lying, cultural theorist Henk de Berg points to a number of further parallels between Trump's and Hitler's rhetoric; namely, the use of jokes and personal insults; the deliberate creation of controversy; interpretative openness, allowing different groups to recognize themselves in the argument; and oratorical meandering in cases where a coherent narrative would draw attention to the argument's inconsistencies. De Berg also points out that extremist language used by Trump's followers is often perceived as authentic, because in real life we also tend to overstate things (e.g., "My new boss is worse than Stalin").

=== Branding ===
Trump used personal branding to market himself as an extraordinary leader by using his celebrity status and name recognition. As one of the communications directors for the MAGA super PAC put it in 2016, "Like Hercules, Donald Trump is a work of fiction." Journalism professor Mark Danner explains that "week after week for a dozen years millions of Americans saw Donald J. Trump portraying the business magus [in The Apprentice], the grand vizier of capitalism, the wise man of the boardroom, a living confection whose every step and word bespoke gravitas and experience and power and authority and ... money. Endless amounts of money."

Political science scholar Andrea Schneiker regards the branding strategy of the Trump public persona as that of a superhero who "uses his superpowers to save others, that is, his country. ... a superhero is needed to solve the problems of ordinary Americans ... Hence, the superhero per definition is an anti-politician. Due to his celebrity status and his identity as entertainer, Donald Trump can thereby be considered to be allowed to take extraordinary measures and even to break rules."

=== Appeal to emotions ===
Historian Peter E. Gordon observes that "Trump, far from being a violation of the norm, actually signifies an emergent norm of the social order" where the categories of the psychological and political have dissolved. (Note: Ann Stoler writes, "These are divisive cuts through our social, political, and affective landscapes that are not eruptions, as they are so often described. Rather, these figures [Trump, Le Pen, and Wilders] register deep tectonic shifts not readily visible with the conceptual tools at hand, nor by the metrics we have used to measure durable sensibilities or to capture sonics to which we are so adverse, askew to our shared radars. Prevailing political categories and concepts may now seem inadequate or inoperative.") In accounting for Trump's election and ability to sustain high approval ratings among voters, Erika Tucker writes in the book Trump and Political Philosophy that though all presidential campaigns have strong emotions associated with them, Trump was able to recognize, and then to gain the trust and loyalty of those who felt strong emotions about perceived changes in the United States. She notes, "Political psychologist Drew Westen has argued that Democrats are less successful at gauging and responding to affective politics—issues that arouse strong emotional states."

Examining the populist appeal of Trump, Hidalgo-Tenorio and Benítez-Castro draw on the theories of Ernesto Laclau, writing, "The emotional appeal of populist discourse is key to its polarising effects, this being so much so that populism 'would be unintelligible without the affective component.' (Laclau 2005, 11)"

Trump uses rhetoric that political scientists have deemed to be both dehumanizing and connected to physical violence by Trump's followers.

=== Emotion, trust, and media ===
Scholar Michael Carpini states that "Trumpism is a culmination of trends that have been occurring for...decades...we are witnessing...a fundamental shift in the relationships between journalism, politics, and democracy." Carpini identifies "the collapsing of the prior [media] regime's presumed and enforced distinctions between news and entertainment." Examining Trump's use of media in Language in the Trump Era, professor Marco Jacquemet writes that this approach "assumes (correctly, it appears) that his audiences care more about shock and entertainment value in their media consumption than almost anything else."

Plasser and Ulram describe a media logic which emphasizes "personalization ... a political star system ... [and] sports based dramatization." Olivier Jutel notes that "Trump's celebrity status and reality-TV rhetoric of 'winning' and 'losing' corresponds perfectly to these values", asserting that "Fox News and conservative personalities from Rush Limbaugh, Glenn Beck and Alex Jones do not simply represent a new political and media voice but embody the convergence of politics and media in which affect and enjoyment are the central values of media production."

Studying paranoia in media, Jessica Johnson writes, "Rather than finding accurate news meaningful, Facebook users find the affective pleasure of connectivity addictive, whether or not the information they share is factual, and that is how communicative capitalism captivates subjects as it holds them captive." Looking back prior to social media, researcher Brian L. Ott writes: "I'm nostalgic for the world of television that [Neil] Postman (1985) argued, produced the 'least well-informed people in the Western world' by packaging news as entertainment. Twitter is producing the most self-involved people in history by treating everything one does or thinks as newsworthy. Television may have assaulted journalism, but Twitter killed it." Commenting on Trump's support among Fox News viewers, Mark Lukasiewicz has a similar perspective, writing, "Tristan Harris famously said that social networks are about 'affirmation, not information'—and the same can be said about cable news, especially in prime time."

Arlie Russell Hochschild holds that Trump supporters trust their preferred sources of information due to the affective bond they have with them. As Daniel Kreiss summarizes Hochschild, "Trump, along with Fox News, gave these strangers in their own land the hope that they would be restored to their rightful place at the center of the nation, and provided a very real emotional release from the fetters of political correctness that dictated they respect people of color, lesbians and gays, and those of other faiths ... that the network's personalities share the same 'deep story' of political and social life, and therefore they learn from them 'what to feel afraid, angry, and anxious about.'"

From Kreiss' account of conservative personalities and media, information became less important than providing a sense of familial bonding, where "family provides a sense of identity, place, and belonging; emotional, social, and cultural support and security; and gives rise to political and social affiliations and beliefs." Hochschild gives the example of a woman who states, "Bill O'Reilly is like a steady, reliable dad. Sean Hannity is like a difficult uncle who rises to anger too quickly. Megyn Kelly (Note: Kelly left Fox in 2017) is like a smart sister. Then there's Greta Van Susteren. And Juan Williams, who came over from NPR, which was too left for him, the adoptee. They're all different, just like in a family."

Olivier Jutel notes that, "Affect is central to the strategy of Fox which imagined its journalism not in terms of servicing the rational citizen in the public sphere but in 'craft[ing] intensive relationships with their viewers' in order to sustain audience share across platforms." (Note: The "(Jones, 2012: 180)" quote appears in Jones, Jeffry P. (2012). "Fox News and the Performance of Ideology". Cinema Journal. 51 (4): 178–185. doi:10.1353/cj.2012.0073. JSTOR 23253592. S2CID 145669733.) In this segmented market, Trump "offers himself as an ego-ideal to an individuated public of enjoyment that coalesce around his media brand as part of their own performance of identity." Jutel states that news media companies benefit from offering spectacle and drama. "Trump is a definitive product of mediatized politics providing the spectacle that drives ratings and affective media consumption, either as part of his populist movement or as the liberal resistance."

Researchers give differing emphasis to which emotions are important to followers. Michael Richardson argues that "affirmation, amplification and circulation of disgust is one of the primary affective drivers of Trump's political success." Richardson agrees with Ott about the "entanglement of Trumpian affect and social media crowds" who seek "affective affirmation, confirmation and amplification. Social media postings of crowd experiences accumulate as 'archives of feelings' that are both dynamic in nature and affirmative of social values."

Social trust expert Karen Jones follows philosopher Annette Baier in explaining that the masters of the art of creating trust and distrust are populist politicians and criminals, who "show a masterful appreciation of the ways in which certain emotional states drive out trust and replace it with distrust." Jones sees Trump as an exemplar of this who recognize that fear and contempt are tools that can reorient networks of trust and distrust in social networks to alter how a potential supporter "interprets the words, deeds, and motives of the other." (Note: Jones elaborates on her view that trust is central to epistemology in a chapter entitled "Trusting Interpretations" which appeared in the book "Trust – Analytic and Applied Perspectives".) She holds that "A core strategy of Donald Trump...has been to manufacture fear and contempt towards some undocumented migrants (among other groups)", a strategy which "has gone global ... in Australia, Austria, Hungary, Poland, Italy and the United Kingdom."

=== Falsehoods and misleading statements ===
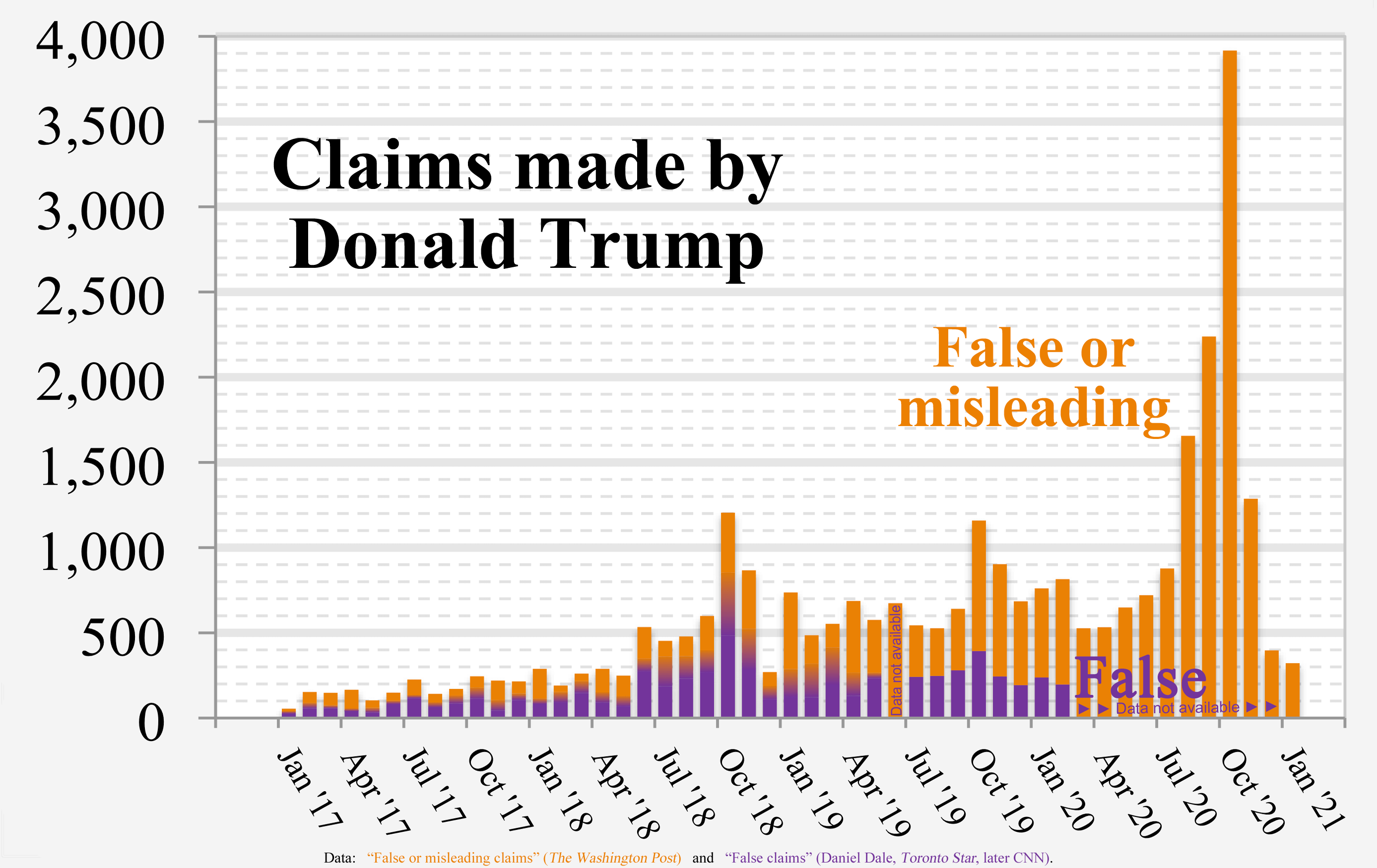
Fact-checkers from The Washington Post, the Toronto Star, and CNN compiled data on "false or misleading claims", and "false claims", respectively. The Post reported 30,573 false or misleading claims in four years, an average of more than 20.9 per day.

To sow election doubt, Trump escalated use of "rigged election" and "election interference" statements in advance of the 2024 election compared to the previous two elections—the statements described as part of a "heads I win; tails you cheated" rhetorical strategy.

Through early October 2026, Trump had attacked the integrity of US elections on more than 70% of the days following his 2025 inauguration, repeatedly making false claims.

Google Trends topic searches for "gaslighting" began a substantial increase in about 2016, around the time of the campaign for the U.S. presidential election. Numerous journalists used the term to describe Trump's statements.

Though the term fake news was known before the 2016 election, since Trump started using it soon after the election, it has been used continuously by Trump, other leaders, political operatives, journalists and ordinary people. Trump weaponized the term as a rhetorical tool to dismiss and discredit unfavorable reporting, undercutting journalism's truth-telling function and delegitimizing journalism for a large part of the electorate.

Despite claims of "landslide" victories, Trump won the 2016 and 2024 elections with respectively 56.9% and 58% of the electoral college—placing the wins in only the 23rd and 28th percentiles of all presidential elections.

Though Trump repeatedly promoted his 2024 victory as a mandate—to inflate the actual degree of voter support—he failed to receive 50% of the popular vote. His 1.5 percentage point margin of victory in 2024 (shown in chart) place it in only the 20th percentile of presidential elections since 1828.

Trump's opposition to wind power involves repeated deceptive claims that "windmills" "kill the birds". However, wind turbines in the U.S. are responsible for less than one one-hundredth of one percent of human-related bird deaths.

There are many falsehoods which Trump presents as facts. Drawing on Harry G. Frankfurt's book On Bullshit, political science professor Matthew McManus argues that Trump is a bullshitter whose sole interest is to persuade, and not a liar (e.g. Richard Nixon) who takes the power of truth seriously and so deceitfully attempts to conceal it. Trump by contrast is indifferent to the truth or unaware of it. Unlike conventional lies of politicians exaggerating their accomplishments, Trump's lies are egregious, making lies about easily verifiable facts. At one rally Trump stated his father "came from Germany", even though Fred Trump was born in New York City.

Leaders at the 2018 United Nations General Assembly burst into laughter at his boast that he had accomplished more in his first two years than any other United States president. Visibly startled, Trump responded to the audience: "I didn't expect that reaction." Trump lies about the trivial, such as claiming that there was no rain on the day of his inauguration when in fact it did rain, as well as making grandiose "Big Lies", such as claiming that Obama founded ISIS, or promoting the birther movement, a conspiracy theory which claims that Obama was born in Kenya, not Hawaii. Connolly points to the similarities of such reality-bending gaslighting with fascist and post Soviet techniques of propaganda including Kompromat (scandalous material), stating that "Trumpian persuasion draws significantly upon the repetition of Big Lies."

Robert Jay Lifton, a scholar of psychohistory and authority on the nature of cults, emphasizes the importance of understanding Trumpism "as an assault on reality". A leader has more power if he is in any part successful at making truth irrelevant to his followers. Trump biographer Timothy L. O'Brien agrees, stating: "It is a core operating principle of Trumpism. If you constantly attack objective reality, you are left as the only trustworthy source of information, which is one of his goals for his relationship with his supporters—that they should believe no one else but him." Lifton believes Trump is a purveyor of a solipsistic reality which is hostile to facts and is made collective by amplifying frustrations and fears held by his community of zealous believers.

Research published in the American Sociological Review found that Trump's lying helped boost his "authentic appeal". It argued that in systems viewed as flawed or with low political legitimacy, a "flagrant violator of established norms" is seen "as an authentic champion" by being perceived as "bravely speaking a deep and otherwise suppressed truth" against a political establishment that does not appear to be working on behalf of the people. While a perceived establishment candidate "may be more likable or perceived to be more competent", voters question the candidates opposition to "the injustice that is said to have permeated the established political system". Andrew Gumbel, writing for The Guardian after the 2024 presidential election, wrote that many Trump voters in Youngstown, Ohio, saw both parties as filled with crooks and liars, but that Trump "comes across as someone who doesn't pretend to be anything other than what he is, and that perceived authenticity counts for more with many Youngstown voters than his character flaws or even his policy positions". Gumbel argued that voters preferred "gut instincts" to "carefully scripted messaging of a Democrat like Kamala Harris or even a mainstream Republican".

== Social psychology ==
=== Dominance orientation ===
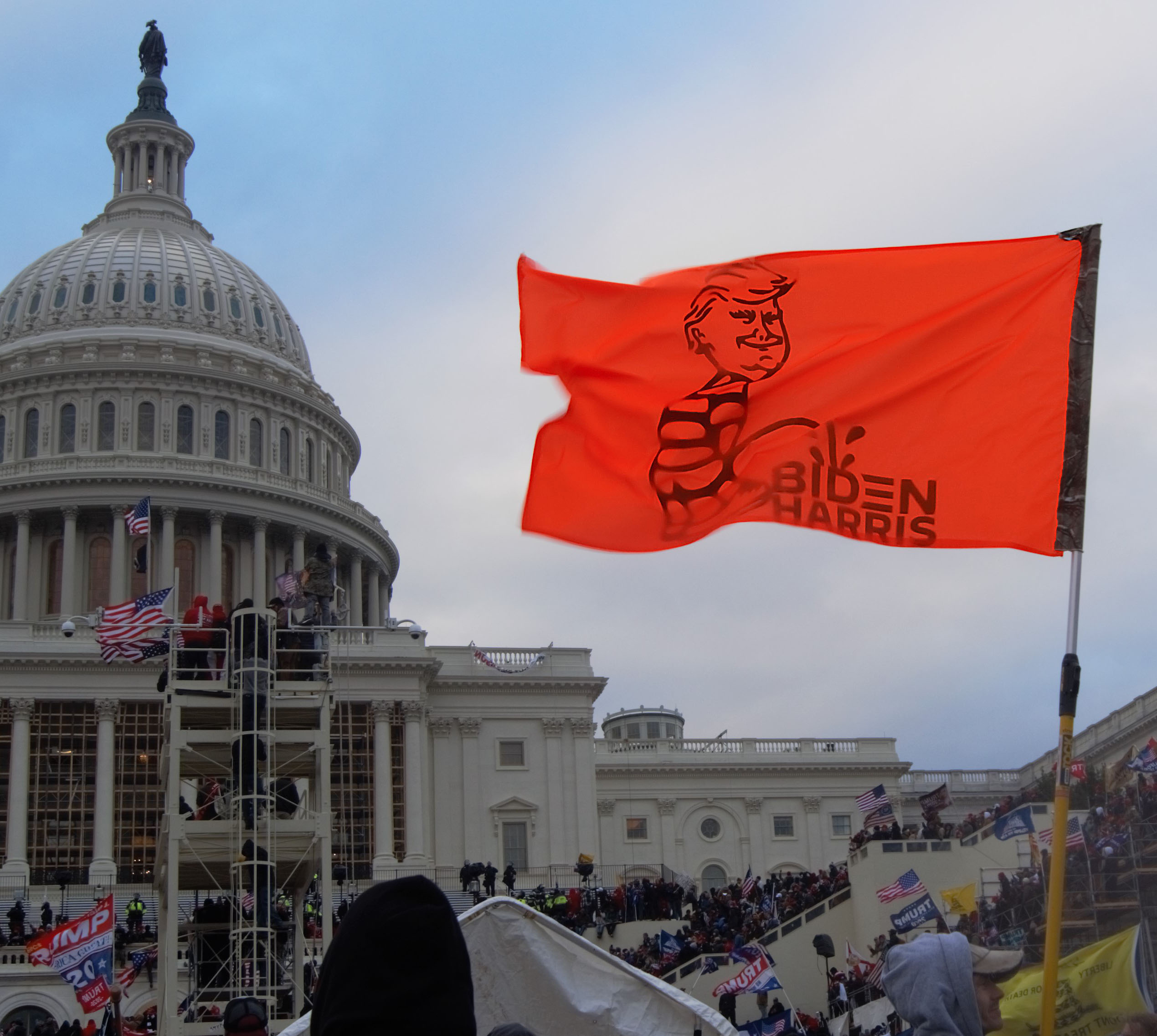
Trump supporters employed a variety of dominance imagery in flags, clothing and a mock gallows on January 6, 2021, when violent Trumpist rioters attempted to overturn the 2020 election, temporarily succeeding in preventing Congress from certifying Trump's loss.

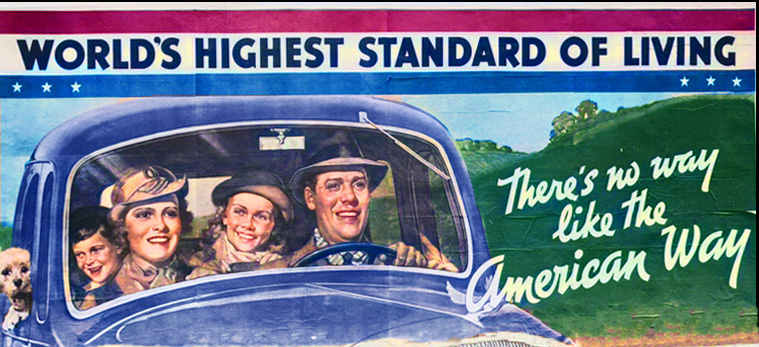
The American way of upward mobility for the deserving is, according to Kimmel and Hochschild, a promise that many Americans feel has been denied them due to forces described within a shared "deep story" commonly held among Trump supporters.

Social psychology research into the Trump movement, such as that of Bob Altemeyer, Thomas F. Pettigrew, and Karen Stenner, views the Trump movement as primarily being driven by the psychological predispositions of its followers, although political and historical factors (reviewed elsewhere in this article) are also involved. An article in Social Psychological and Personality Science described a study concluding that Trump followers prefer hierarchical and ethnocentric social orders that favor their in-group.

In the non-academic book, Authoritarian Nightmare: Trump and His Followers, Altemeyer and John Dean describe research which reaches the same conclusions. Despite disparate and inconsistent beliefs and ideologies, a coalition of such followers can become cohesive and broad in part because each individual "compartmentalizes" their thoughts and they are free to define their sense of the threatened tribal in-group in their own terms, whether it is predominantly related to their cultural or religious views (e.g. the mystery of evangelical support for Trump), nationalism (e.g. the Make America Great Again slogan), or their race (maintaining a white majority).

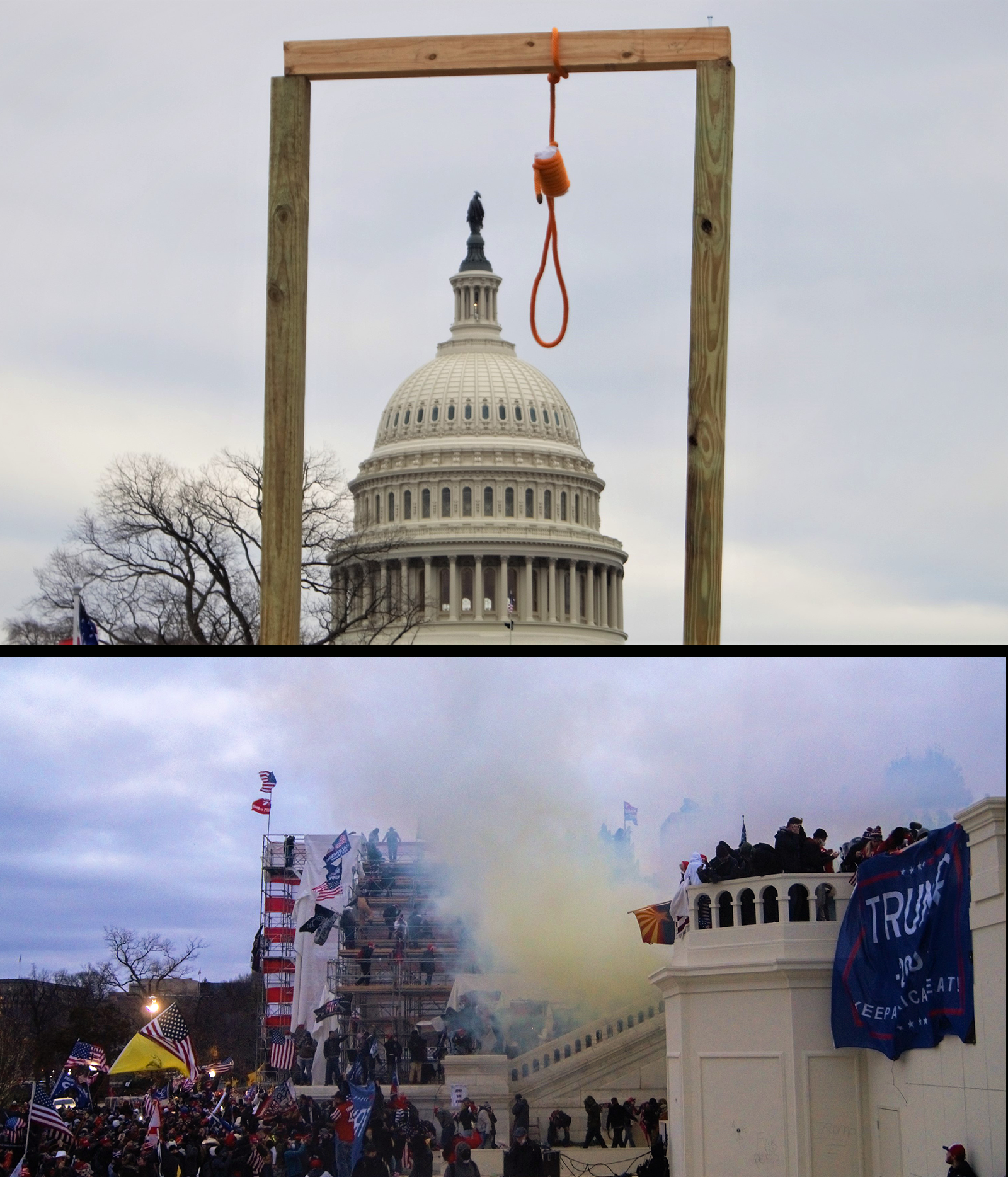
Mock gallows and Trump supporters attacking Congress on January 6, 2021

Altemeyer, MacWilliams, Feldman, Choma, Hancock, Van Assche and Pettigrew claim that instead of directly attempting to measure such ideological, racial or policy views, supporters of such movements can be reliably predicted by using two social psychology scales (singly or in combination), namely right-wing authoritarian (RWA) measures which were developed in the 1980s by Altemeyer and other authoritarian personality researchers, (Note: The measure is a refinement of the authoritarian personality theory published in 1950 by researchers Theodor W. Adorno, Else Frenkel-Brunswik, Daniel Levinson and Nevitt Sanford. Despite its name, RWA measures predisposition towards authoritarianism regardless of political orientation.) and the social dominance orientation (SDO) scale developed in the 1990s by social dominance theorists.

In May 2019, Monmouth University Polling Institute conducted a study in collaboration with Altemeyer in order to empirically test the hypothesis using the SDO and RWA measures. The finding was that social dominance orientation and affinity for authoritarian leadership are highly correlated with followers of Trumpism. This study further confirmed of the studies discussed in MacWilliams (2016), Feldman (2020), Choma and Hancock (2017), and Van Assche & Pettigrew (2016).

The research does not imply that the followers always behave in an authoritarian manner but that expression is contingent, which means there is reduced influence if it is not triggered by fear and what the subject perceives as threats. Similar social psychological techniques for analyzing Trumpism have been effective in identifying adherents of similar movements in Europe, including in Belgium and France (Lubbers & Scheepers, 2002; Swyngedouw & Giles, 2007; Van Hiel & Mervielde, 2002; Van Hiel, 2012), the Netherlands (Cornelis & Van Hiel, 2014) and Italy (Leone, Desimoni & Chirumbolo, 2014). Quoting comments from participants in focus groups made up of people who had voted for Democrat Obama in 2012 but flipped to Trump in 2016, pollster Diane Feldman noted the anti-government, anti-coastal-elite anger: "'They think they're better than us, they're P.C., they're virtue-signallers.' '[Trump] doesn't come across as one of those people who think they're better than us and are screwing us.' 'They lecture us.' 'They don't even go to church.' 'They're in charge, and they're ripping us off.'"

=== Comparisons to animal social behavior ===
Former speaker of the House Newt Gingrich explained the central role of dominance in his speech "Principles of Trumpism", comparing the needed leadership style to that of a violent bear. Psychology researcher Dan P. McAdams thinks a better comparison is to the dominance behavior of alpha male chimpanzees such as Yeroen, the subject of an extensive study of chimp social behavior conducted by renowned primatologist Frans de Waal. Christopher Boehm, a professor of biology and anthropology agrees, writing, "his model of political posturing has echoes of what I saw in the wild in six years in Tanzania studying the Gombe chimpanzees," and "seems like a classic alpha display."

Using the example of Yeroen, McAdams describes the similarities: "On Twitter, Trump's incendiary tweets are like Yeroen's charging displays. In chimp colonies, the alpha male occasionally goes berserk and starts screaming, hooting, and gesticulating wildly as he charges toward other males nearby. Pandemonium ensues as rival males cower in fear ... Once the chaos ends, there is a period of peace and order, wherein rival males pay homage to the alpha, visiting him, grooming him, and expressing various forms of submission. In Trump's case, his tweets are designed to intimidate his foes and rally his submissive base ... These verbal outbursts reinforce the president's dominance by reminding everybody of his wrath and his force."

Primatologist Dame Jane Goodall explains that like the dominance performances of Trump, "In order to impress rivals, males seeking to rise in the dominance hierarchy perform spectacular displays: Stamping, slapping the ground, dragging branches, throwing rocks. The more vigorous and imaginative the display, the faster the individual is likely to rise in the hierarchy, and the longer he is likely to maintain that position." The comparison has been echoed by political observers sympathetic to Trump. Nigel Farage, an enthusiastic backer of Trump, stated that in the 2016 United States presidential debates where Trump loomed up on Clinton, he "looked like a big silverback gorilla", and added that "he is that big alpha male. The leader of the pack!"

McAdams points out the audience gets to vicariously share in the sense of dominance due to the parasocial bonding that his performance produces for his fans, as shown by Shira Gabriel's research studying the phenomenon in Trump's role in The Apprentice. McAdams writes that the "television audience vicariously experienced the world according to Donald Trump", a world where Trump says "Man is the most vicious of all animals, and life is a series of battles ending in victory or defeat."

=== Collective narcissism ===
Cultural anthropologist Paul Stoller thinks Trump employed celebrity culture-glitz, illusion and fantasy to construct a shared alternate reality where lies become truth and reality's resistance to one's own dreams is overcome by the right attitude and bold self-confidence. Trump's father indoctrinated his children from an early age into the positive thinking approach to reality advocated by the family's pastor Norman Vincent Peale. Trump said that Peale considered him the greatest student of his philosophy that regards facts as not important, because positive attitudes will instead cause what you "image" to materialize. Trump biographer Gwenda Blair thinks Trump "weaponized" Peale's self-help philosophy.

Collective narcissism measures have been shown to be a powerful predictor of membership in authoritarian movements including Trump's.

External videos
- Presentation by John Fea on Believe Me: The Evangelical Road to Donald Trump, July 7, 2018, C-SPAN
- Washington Journal interview with Fea on Believe Me, July 8, 2018, C-SPAN

In his book Believe Me which details Trump's exploitation of white evangelical politics of fear, Messiah College history professor John Fea points out the narcissistic nature of the fanciful appeals to nostalgia, noting that "In the end, the practice of nostalgia is inherently selfish because it focuses entirely on our own experience of the past and not on the experience of others. For example, people nostalgic for the world of Leave It to Beaver may fail to recognize that other people, perhaps even some of the people living in the Cleaver's suburban "paradise" of the 1950s, were not experiencing the world in a way that they would describe as 'great.' Nostalgia can give us tunnel vision. Its selective use of the past fails to recognize the complexity and breadth of the human experience ... ."

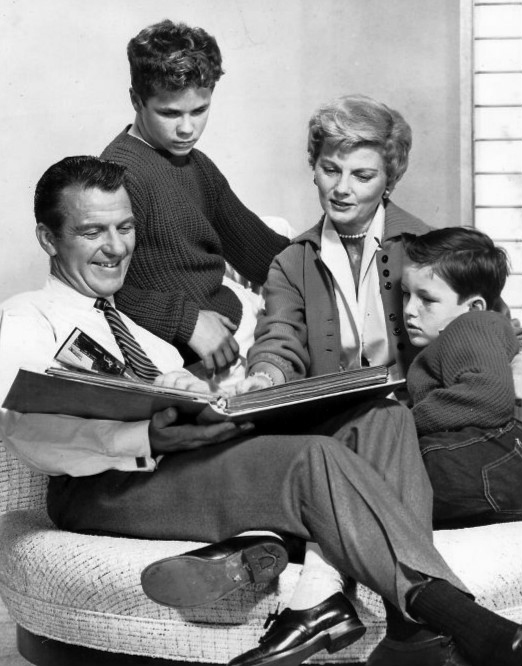
According to historian John Fea, many Trump followers seek refuge from change by urging return to a utopian Leave it to Beaver version of America.

According to Fea, the hopelessness of achieving an idealized past "causes us to imagine a future filled with horror" leading to conspiratorial narratives that easily mobilize white evangelicals. As a result, they are easily captivated by a strongman such as Trump who repeats and amplifies their fears while posing as the deliverer from them. In his review of Fea's analysis of the impact of conspiracy theories on white evangelical Trump supporters, scholar of religious politics David Gutterman writes: "The greater the threat, the more powerful the deliverance." Gutterman's view is that "Donald J. Trump did not invent this formula; evangelicals have, in their lack of spiritual courage, demanded and gloried in this message for generations. Despite the literal biblical reassurance to 'fear not,' white evangelicals are primed for fear, their identity is stoked by fear, and the sources of fear are around every unfamiliar turn.

Social theory scholar John Cash notes that disaster narratives of impending horrors have a broad audience, pointing to a 2010 Pew study which found that 41 percent of those in the US think that the world will probably be destroyed by the middle of the century. Cash points out that certainties may be found in other narratives which also have the effect of uniting like minded individuals into shared "us versus them" narratives.

Cash thinks that psychoanalytic theorist Joel Whitebook is correct that "Trumpism as a social experience can be understood as a psychotic like phenomenon, that "[Trumpism is] an intentional [...] attack on our relation to reality." Whitebook thinks Trump's playbook is like that of Putin's strategist Vladislav Surkov who employs "ceaseless shapeshifting, appealing to nationalist skinheads one moment and human rights groups the next."

Cash compares Alice in Wonderland to Trump's ability to seemingly embrace disparate fantasies in a series of contradictory tweets and pronouncements, for example appearing to encourage the neo-Nazi protestors after Charlottesville or for audiences with felt grievances about America's first black president, the claim that Obama wiretapped him. Cash writes: "Unlike the resilient Alice, who ... insists on truth and accuracy when confronted by a world of reversals, contradictions, nonsense and irrationality, Trump reverses this process. ... Trump has dragged the uninhibited and distorted world of the other side of the looking-glass into our shared world."

Lifton sees important differences between Trumpism and typical cults, such as not advancing a totalist ideology and lack of isolation from the outside world. Lifton identifies similarities with cults that disparage the "fake world" created by the cult's titanic enemies.

Cultlike persuasion techniques are used, such as echoing of catch phrases. Examples include the use of call and response ("Clinton" triggers "lock her up"; "immigrants" triggers "build that wall"; "who will pay for it?" triggers "Mexico"), deepening the sense of unity between the leader and the community. Participants and observers at rallies have remarked on a liberating feeling which Lifton calls a "high state" that "can even be called experiences of transcendence".

==== Conspiracy theories ====
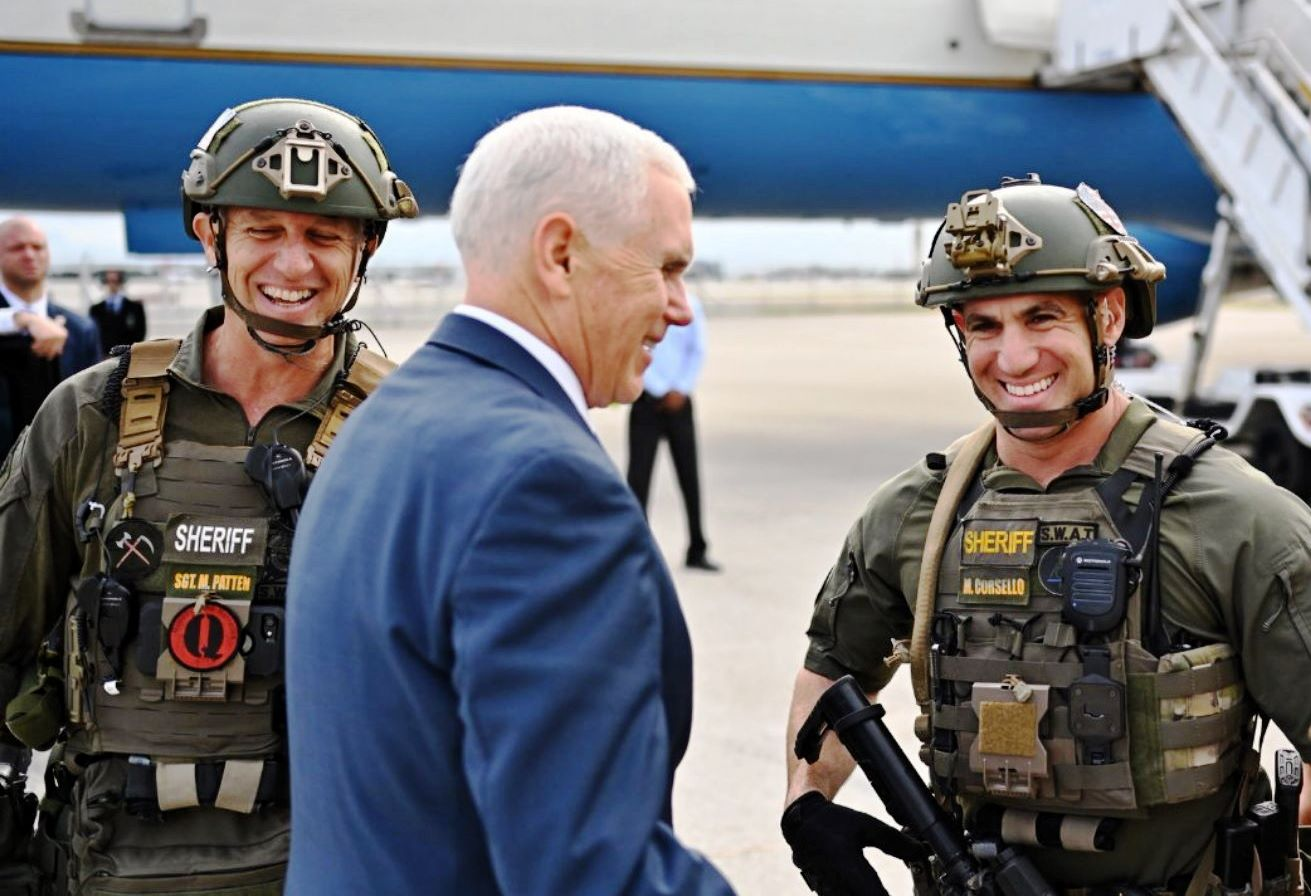
Conspiracy theories such as QAnon are widely accepted among Trump supporters according to polling data from 2020. Pictured are Vice President Mike Pence and members of the Broward County, Florida SWAT team assigned to a high-profile security detail, one of whom is wearing a QAnon patch.

Conservative culture commentator David Brooks observes that under Trump, this post-truth mindset, heavily reliant on conspiracy themes, came to dominate Republican identity, providing its believers a sense of superiority since such insiders possess important information most people do not have. This results in an empowering sense of agency with the liberation, entitlement and group duty to reject "experts" and the influence of hidden cabals seeking to dominate them.

Prior to 2015, Trump already had established a bond with followers due to television and media appearances. For those sharing his political views, Trump's use of Twitter to share his views caused those bonds to intensify, causing his supporters to feel a deepened empathetic bond as with a friend—sharing his anger and outrage, taking pride in his successes, sharing in his denial of failures and his oftentimes conspiratorial views.

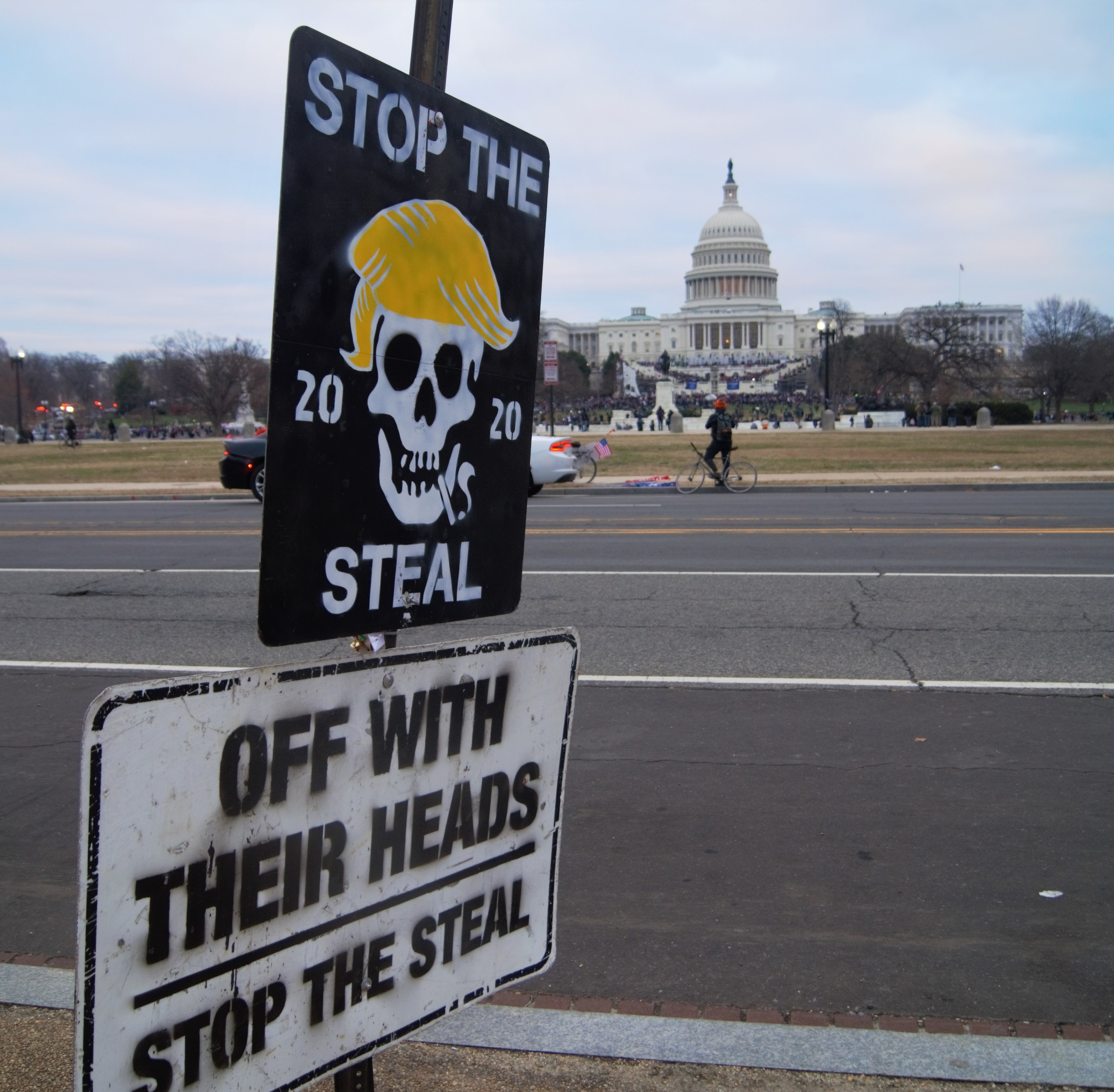
Dominance imagery using the Stop the Steal conspiracy theme erected on the day of the Capitol assault. Seventy-six percent of Republicans believe the conspiracy theory, with nearly half approving of the Capitol assault. (Note: The skull with Trump hair refers to the Punisher skull, worn by a comic book vigilante serial killer who murders those he considers evil. More stylized Punisher images appeared on patches worn by some rioters in combat attire, multiple police at Black lives matter protests and frequently as a Sean Hannity's lapel pin.)

Brooks thinks sharing of conspiracy theories has become the most powerful community bonding mechanism of the 21st century.

Hofstadter's The Paranoid Style in American Politics describes the political efficacy of conspiracy theories. Some attribute Trump's political success to making such narratives a rhetorical staple. The conspiracy theory QAnon asserts that top Democrats run a child sex-trafficking ring and Trump is trying to dismantle it. An October 2020 Yahoo-YouGov poll showed that elements of the QAnon claims are said to be true by half of Trump supporters polled.

Some social psychologists see the predisposition of Trumpists towards interpreting social interactions in terms of dominance frameworks as extending to their relationship towards facts. A study by Felix Sussenbach and Adam B. Moore found that the dominance motive strongly correlated with hostility towards disconfirming facts and affinity for conspiracies among 2016 Trump voters but not among Clinton voters. Many critics note Trump's skill in exploiting narrative, emotion, and a whole host of rhetorical ploys to draw supporters into the group's common adventure as characters in a story much bigger than themselves.

It is a story that involves not just a community-building call to arms to defeat titanic threats, or of the leader's heroic deeds restoring American greatness, but of a restoration of each supporter's individual sense of liberty and control. Trump channels and amplifies these aspirations, explaining in one of his books that his bending of the truth is effective because it plays to people's greatest fantasies. By contrast, Clinton was dismissive of such emotion-filled storytelling and ignored the emotional dynamics of the Trumpist narrative.

=== Cult of personality ===
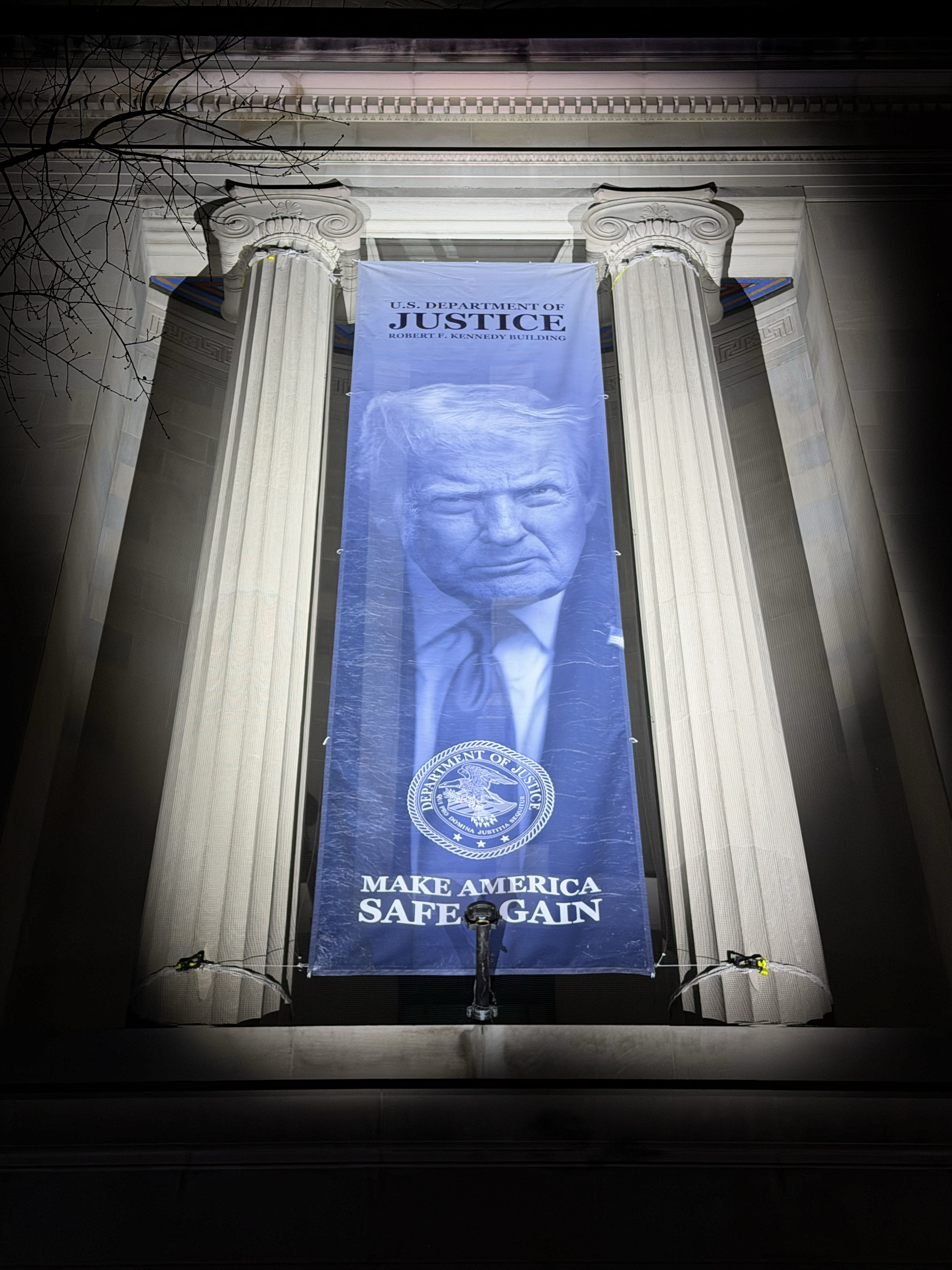
Banner hanging at the Robert F. Kennedy Department of Justice Building in February 2026

Trump's support has been compared to a cult of personality. (Note: Attributed to multiple sources: Sundahl 2022; Franks & Hesami 2021; Adams 2021, p. 256; Reyes 2020, p. 869; Goldsmith & Moen 2024; Diamond 2023, p. 96: "The cult of Trumpism fosters and exploits paranoia and allegiance to an all-powerful, charismatic figure, contributing to a social milieu at risk for the erosion of democratic principles and the rise of fascism."; Hassan 2019, p. xviii; Butler 2020; Haltiwanger 2021; Tharoor 2022; Ben-Ghiat 2020; Horton 2020) Trump's message and self-representation involved the creation of an identity as a non-politician, businessman, and great leader, distancing himself from traditional politicians and from the traditional Republican Party. His strategy involved the creation of an ethos of "saving America" through populist intentions and fighting imagined enemies with "I versus them" rhetoric that constituted the formation of a cult of personality. Trump's contingent of hard-core supporters allowed him to maintain a grip on his political party even after several actions and controversies that would have discredited other politicians.

News media and commentators have widely characterized Trump as the object of a personality cult. His support was found to satisfy all parameters needed to determine a personality cult based on Max Weber's concept of charismatic authority. Research found examples of asymmetric bias by his supporters in favor of Trump, such as left-leaning individuals having alleged cases of "Trump derangement syndrome".

Other research has argued that Trump's personality cult revolves around an "all-powerful, charismatic figure, contributing to a social milieu at risk for the erosion of democratic principles and the rise of fascism" based on the analysis of psychoanalysts and sociopolitical historians. Research using the Big Five model of personality has found that his most loyal followers tend to score highly in conscientiousness / self-discipline, traits likely to be attracted to "personalistic, loyalty-demanding leaders" like Trump.

Several aspects of cult-like loyalty to Trump have been found to have religious parallels among certain supporters. Christian nationalism is strongly correlated with support for Trump. Certain evangelicals have referred to him in religious terms, casting him as a divinely ordained savior and "chosen one". Researchers have compared his followers as participating in a psychodynamic of shared psychosis.

== Relationship with media ==
=== Culture industry and pillarization ===
Peter E. Gordon, Alex Ross, sociologist David L. Andrews and Harvard political theorist David Lebow look on Theodor Adorno and Max Horkheimer's concept of the "culture industry" as useful for comprehending Trumpism. (Note: For instance in the introduction to his book Making Sport Great Again, Andrews writes, "The prescience of much Frankfurt School theorizing informs this analysis of the relationship between ubersport as a popular culture industry, the politics of neoliberal America, and Trump's cacophonous political-cultural-economic project.") As Ross explains the concept, the culture industry replicates "fascist methods of mass hypnosis ... blurring the line between reality and fiction", explaining, "Trump is as much a pop-culture phenomenon as he is a political one." Gordon observes that these purveyors of popular culture are not just leveraging outrage, but are turning politics into a more commercially lucrative product, a "polarized, standardized reflection of opinion into forms of humor and theatricalized outrage within narrow niche markets ... within which one swoons to one's preferred slogan and already knows what one knows. Name just about any political position and what sociologists call 'pillarization'—or what the Frankfurt School called 'ticket' thinking—will predict, almost without fail, a full suite of opinions." (Note: The idea is that while markets attempt to turn the population into unthinking mass consumers, political actors (from parties to politicians to interest groups) use the same mechanisms to turn us into unthinking mass citizens—a Frankfurt school concept which Marcuse explored further in his book One Dimensional Man. Horkheimer and Adorno's "ticket" metaphor refers to the political party sense of a slate of candidates and policies that followers expect to vote for in its entirety because they have come to believe that the ideas from the opposing political blocs are so irreconcilable their political power is simplified to a binary choice which despite the intense rhetoric reduces them to passive observers of the spectacle.)

Trumpism is from Lebow's perspective, more of a result of this process than a cause. In the intervening years since Adorno's work, Lebow believes the culture industry has evolved into a politicizing culture market "based increasingly on the internet, constituting a self-referential hyperreality shorn from any reality of referants ... sensationalism and insulation intensify intolerance of dissonance and magnify hostility against alternative hyperrealities. In a self-reinforcing logic of escalation, intolerance and hostility further encourage sensationalism and the retreat into insularity." (Note: Political scientist Matthew McManus makes a similar observation writing that Trump is the culmination of this trend towards pillarized tribalistic market niches where the hyperpartisan discourses characteristic of Fox News in the US or Hír TV in Hungary have displaced nuanced analysis.) From Gordon's view, "Trumpism itself, one could argue, is just another name for the culture industry, where the performance of undoing repression serves as a means for carrying on precisely as before."

From this viewpoint, the susceptibility to psychological manipulation of individuals with social dominance inclinations is not at the center of Trumpism, but is instead the "culture industry" which exploits these and other susceptibilities by using mechanisms that condition people to think in standardized ways. The burgeoning culture industry respects no political boundaries as it develops these markets with Gordon emphasizing "This is true on the left as well as the right, and it is especially noteworthy once we countenance what passes for political discourse today. Instead of a public sphere, we have what Jürgen Habermas long ago called the refeudalization of society."

What Kreiss calls an "identity-based account of media" is important for understanding Trump's success because "citizens understand politics and accept information through the lens of partisan identity. ... The failure to come to grips with a socially embedded public and an identity group–based democracy has placed significant limits on our ability to imagine a way forward for journalism and media in the Trump era. As Fox News and Breitbart have discovered, there is power in the claim of representing and working for particular publics, quite apart from any abstract claims to present the truth."

=== Profitability of spectacle and outrage ===
Examining Trumpism as an entertainment product, some media research focuses on outrage discourse, relating the entertainment value of Trump's rhetoric to the commercial interests of media companies. Outrage narratives on political blogs, talk radio and cable news shows were, in the decades prior, a new genre which grew due to its profitability.

Media critic David Denby writes, "Like a good standup comic, Trump invites the audience to join him in the adventure of delivering his act—in this case, the barbarously entertaining adventure of running a Presidential campaign that insults everybody." Denby claims that Trump is good at delivering entertainment that consumers demand. He observes that "The movement's standard of allowable behavior has been formed by popular culture—by standup comedy and, recently, by reality TV and by the snarking, trolling habits of the Internet. ... it's exactly vulgar sensationalism and buffoonery that his audience is buying. Donald Trump has been produced by America."

Trump made false assertions, mean spirited attacks and dog whistle appeals to racial and religious intolerance. CBS's CEO Les Moonves remarked that "It may not be good for America, but it's damn good for CBS," demonstrating how Trump's messaging is compatible with the financial goals of media companies. Peter Wehner, senior fellow at the Ethics and Public Policy Center considers Trump a political "shock jock" who "thrives on creating disorder, in violating rules, in provoking outrage."

The political profitability of incivility was demonstrated by the amount of airtime devoted to Trump's 2016 primary campaign—estimated at two billion to almost five billion dollars. The advantage of incivility was as true in social media, where "a BuzzFeed analysis found that the top 20 fake election news stories emanating from hoax sites and hyperpartisan blogs generated more engagement on Facebook (as measured by shares, reactions, and comments) than the top 20 election stories produced by 19 major news outlets combined, including The New York Times, Washington Post, Huffington Post, and NBC News."

=== Social media ===
Donald J. Trump
(@realDonaldTrump)
tweeted:

My use of social media is not Presidential – it's MODERN DAY PRESIDENTIAL. Make America Great Again!

July 1, 2017

Surveying research of how Trumpist communication is well suited to social media, Brian Ott writes that, "commentators who have studied Trump's public discourse have observed speech patterns that correspond closely to what I identified as Twitter's three defining features [Simplicity, impulsivity, and incivility]." Media critic Neal Gabler has a similar viewpoint writing that "What FDR was to radio and JFK to television, Trump is to Twitter." Outrage discourse expert Patrick O'Callaghan argues that social media is most effective when it utilizes the particular type of communication which Trump relies on. O'Callaghan notes that sociologist Sarah Sobieraj and political scientist Jeffrey M. Berry almost perfectly described in 2011 the social media communication style used by Trump long before his presidential campaign.

They explained that such discourse "[involves] efforts to provoke visceral responses (e.g., anger, righteousness, fear, moral indignation) from the audience through the use of overgeneralizations, sensationalism, misleading or patently inaccurate information, ad hominem attacks, and partial truths about opponents, who may be individuals, organizations, or entire communities of interest (e.g., progressives or conservatives) or circumstance (e.g., immigrants). Outrage sidesteps the messy nuances of complex political issues in favor of melodrama, misrepresentative exaggeration, mockery, and improbable forecasts of impending doom. Outrage talk is not so much discussion as it is verbal competition, political theater with a scorecard."

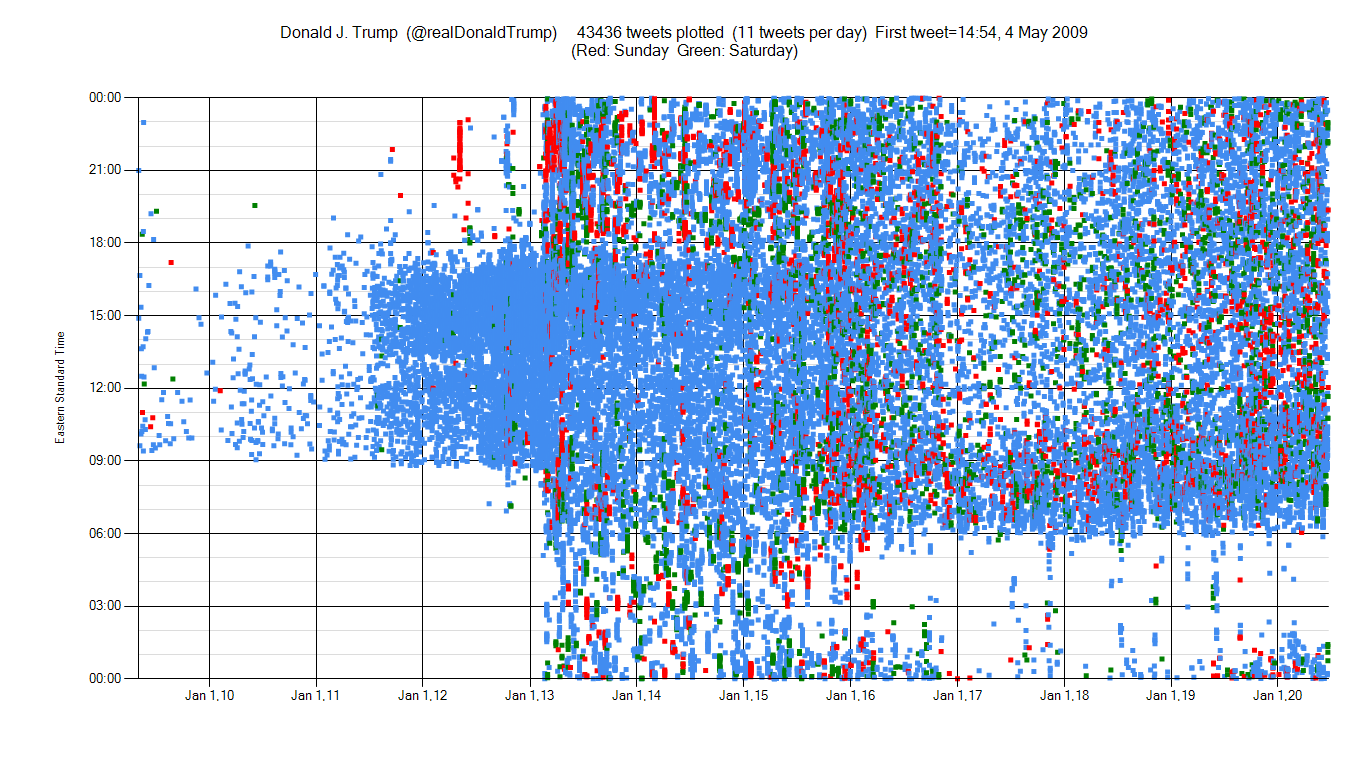
Trump's hourly tweet activity from his first tweet in May 2009 until his suspension from the website in 2021. His tweet activity pattern changed markedly in 2013.

Due to Facebook's and Twitter's narrowcasting environment in which outrage discourse thrives, (Note: One of Sobieraj and Berry's key findings was that, "Outrage thrives in a narrowcasting environment.") Trump's employment of such messaging at almost every opportunity was from O'Callaghan's account extremely effective because tweets and posts were repeated in viral fashion among like minded supporters, thereby rapidly building a substantial information echo chamber, a phenomenon Cass Sunstein identifies as group polarization, and other researchers refer to as a kind of self re-enforcing homophily. (Note: Homophily is the sociological term corresponding to the saying "Birds of a feather flock together." Pointing to a 2015 Pew Research Center study revealing that the average Facebook user has five politically like-minded friends for every one from the opposing end of the spectrum, like Massachs et al. (2020), Samantha Power takes note of the combination of social media and homophily's self-reinforcing impact on our perceived world writing, "The information that comes to us has increasingly been tailored to appeal to our prior prejudices, and it is unlikely to be challenged by the like-minded with whom we interact day-to-day.") Within these information cocoons, it matters little to social media companies whether much of the information spread in such pillarized information silos is false, because as digital culture critic Olivia Solon points out, "the truth of a piece of content is less important than whether it is shared, liked, and monetized."

Citing Pew Research's survey that found 62% of US adults get their news from social media, Ott expresses alarm, "since the 'news' content on social media regularly features fake and misleading stories from sources devoid of editorial standards." Media critic Alex Ross is similarly alarmed, observing, "Silicon Valley monopolies have taken a hands-off, ideologically vacant attitude toward the upswelling of ugliness on the Internet," and that "the failure of Facebook to halt the proliferation of fake news during the [Trump vs. Clinton] campaign season should have surprised no one. ... Traffic trumps ethics."

O'Callaghan's analysis of Trump's use of social media is that "outrage hits an emotional nerve and is therefore grist to the populist's or the social antagonist's mill. Secondly, the greater and the more widespread the outrage discourse, the more it has a detrimental effect on social capital. This is because it leads to mistrust and misunderstanding amongst individuals and groups, to entrenched positions, to a feeling of 'us versus them'. So understood, outrage discourse not only produces extreme and polarising views but also ensures that a cycle of such views continues. (Consider also in this context Wade Robison (2020) on the 'contagion of passion' and Cass Sunstein (2001, pp. 98–136) (Note: The 2001 reference is to an earlier edition of Sunstein's Republic.com. An updated chapter on cybercascades may be found in his Republic.com 2.0 (2007).) on 'cybercascades'.)" Ott agrees, stating that contagion is the best word to describe the viral nature of outrage discourse on social media, and writing that "Trump's simple, impulsive, and uncivil Tweets do more than merely reflect sexism, racism, homophobia, and xenophobia; they spread those ideologies like a social cancer."

Robison warns that emotional contagion should not be confused with the contagion of passions that James Madison and David Hume were concerned with. (Note: Hume argued that democracy in city-states of ancient Greece failed because in small cities, sentiments could rapidly spread in the population, meaning agitators were "more likely to succeed in sweeping aside the old order". Madison responded to this threat of tyrannical majority factions unified by a shared sentiment in Federalist paper number 10 with the argument (Robison's paraphrase): "In an extensive country, distance immunizes citizens from the contagion of passions and hinders their coordination even when passions are shared." Robison thinks this portion of Madison's argument is obsolete due to the near instantaneous social media sharing of sentiments wherever we are due to the commonplace use of wirelessly connected handheld devices.) Robison states they underestimated the contagion of passions mechanism at work in movements, whose modern expressions include the surprising phenomena of rapidly mobilized social media supporters behind both the Arab Spring and the Trump presidential campaign writing, "It is not that we experience something and then, assessing it, become passionate about it, or not", and implying that "we have the possibility of a check on our passions." Robison's view is that the contagion affects the way reality itself is experienced by supporters because it leverages how subjective certainty is triggered, so that those experiencing the contagiously shared alternate reality are unaware they have taken on a belief they should assess.

== Similar movements, politicians and personalities ==
=== Historical background in the United States ===
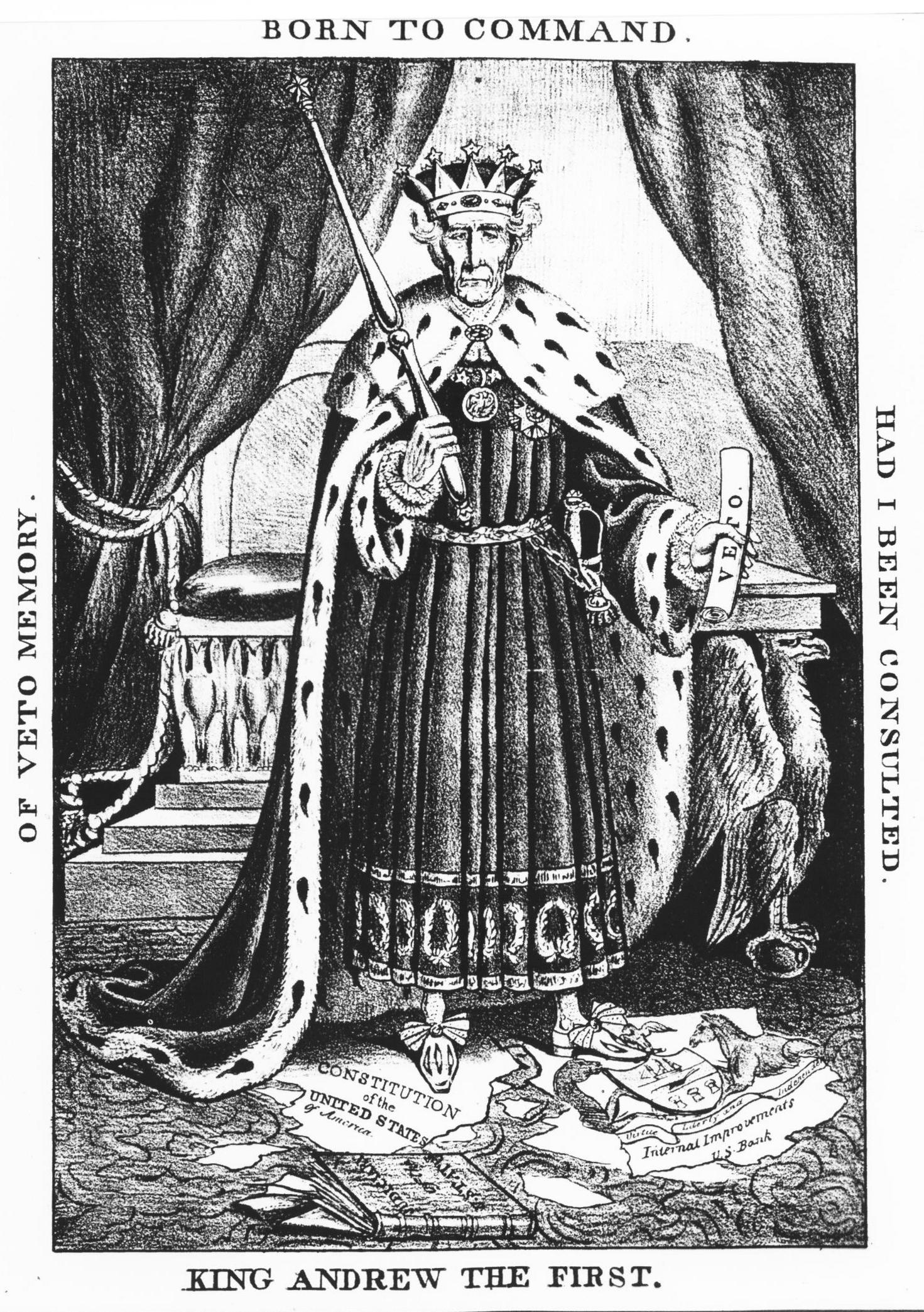
An 1832 political cartoon depicting two-term President Andrew Jackson as an autocratic king, with the constitution trampled beneath his feet

The roots of Trumpism in the United States can be traced to the Jacksonian era according to scholars Walter Russell Mead, Peter Katzenstein, and Edwin Kent Morris. Eric Rauchway says: "Trumpism—nativism and white supremacy—has deep roots in American history. But Trump himself put it to new and malignant purpose."

Andrew Jackson's followers felt he was one of them, enthusiastically supporting his defiance of politically correct norms of the nineteenth century and even constitutional law when they stood in the way of public policy popular among his followers. Jackson ignored the U.S. Supreme Court ruling in Worcester v. Georgia and initiated the forced Cherokee removal from their treaty protected lands to benefit white locals at the cost of between 2,000 and 6,000 dead Cherokee men, women, and children. Notwithstanding such cases of Jacksonian inhumanity, Mead's view is that Jacksonianism provides the historical precedent explaining the movement of followers of Trump, marrying grass-roots disdain for elites, deep suspicion of overseas entanglements, and obsession with American power and sovereignty, acknowledging that it has often been a xenophobic, "whites only" political movement. Mead thinks this "hunger in America for a Jacksonian figure" drives followers towards Trump but cautions that historically "he is not the second coming of Andrew Jackson," stating that Trump's "proposals tended to be pretty vague and often contradictory," exhibiting the common weakness of newly elected populist leaders, commenting early in his presidency that "now he has the difficulty of, you know, 'How do you govern?'" Contradictorily, it has also been argued that Trump's historical precedent is in the Whig Party of Andrew Jackson's enemies. The Whigs and their successors the Know-Nothings were usually pro-tariff and anti-immigrant, and the party collapsed in the 1850s due to not taking a clear position on slavery.

Morris agrees with Mead, locating Trumpism's roots in the Jacksonian era from 1828 to 1848 under the presidencies of Jackson, Martin Van Buren and James K. Polk. On Morris's view, Trumpism also shares similarities with the post-World War I faction of the progressive movement which catered to a conservative populist recoil from the looser morality of the cosmopolitan cities and America's changing racial complexion. In his book The Age of Reform (1955), historian Richard Hofstadter identified this faction's emergence when "a large part of the Progressive-Populist tradition had turned sour, became illiberal and ill-tempered."

An article by National Public Radio's Ron Elving likens the populism of late-19th and early-20th century Populist politician William Jennings Bryan to the later right-wing populism of Trump. Bryan, while economically liberal, was socially and theologically conservative, supporting creationism, Prohibition and other aspects of Christian fundamentalism. However, Trump also draws inspiration from Bryan's 1896 and 1900 Republican opponent, William McKinley, both in regard to protectionist tariffs and imperialism.

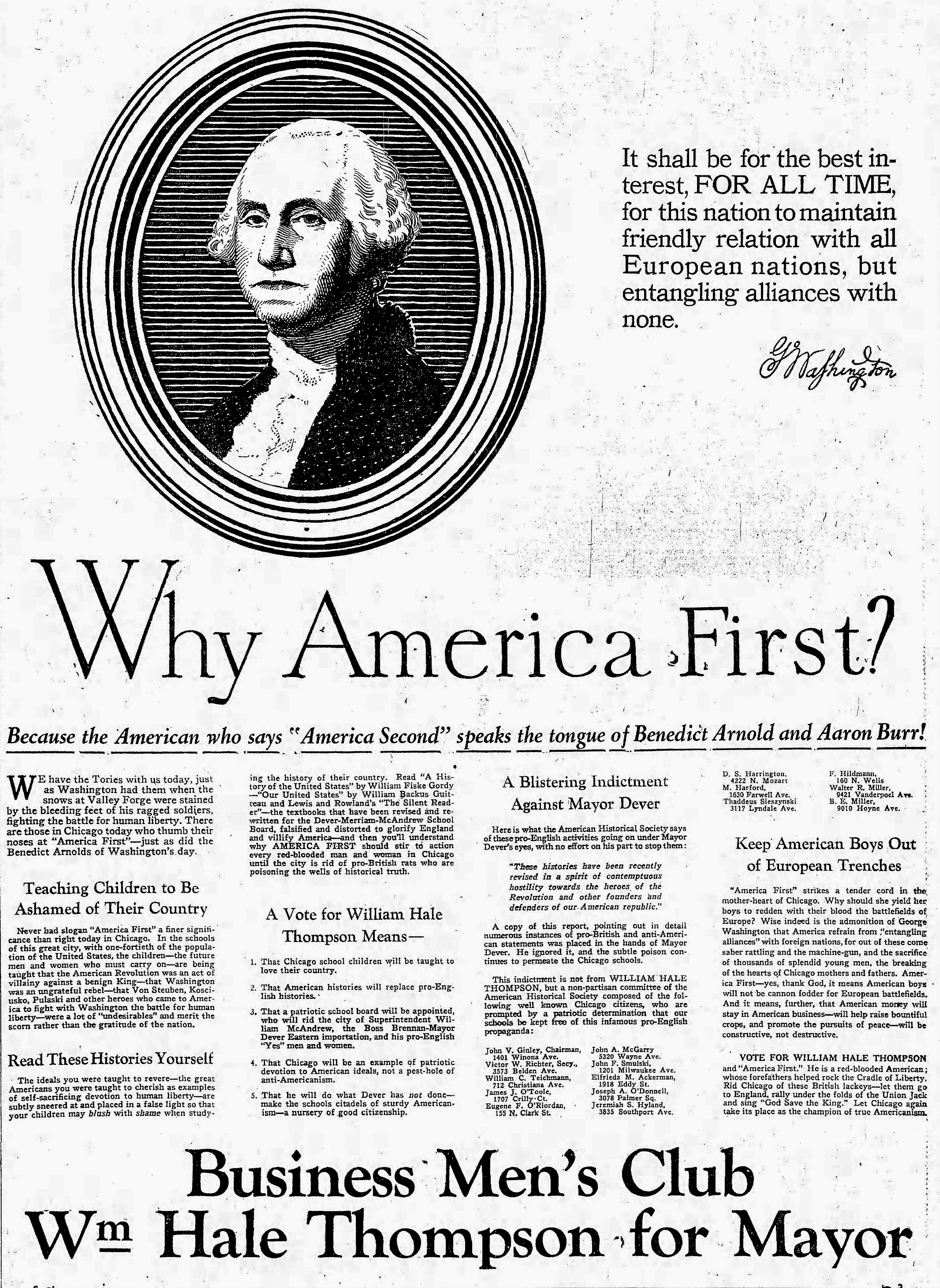
A 1927 "America First" political advertisement advocating isolationism and establishing emotional ties of 1927 Chicago mayoral candidate William Hale Thompson with his German and Irish supporters by vilifying the United Kingdom

Prior to World War II, conservative themes of Trumpism were expressed in the America First Committee movement in the early 20th century, and after World War II were attributed to a Republican Party faction known as the Old Right. By the 1990s, it became referred to as the paleoconservative movement, which according to Morris has now been rebranded as Trumpism. Leo Löwenthal's book Prophets of Deceit (1949) summarized common narratives expressed in the post-World War II period of this populist fringe, specifically examining American demagogues of the period when modern mass media was married with the same destructive style of politics that historian Charles Clavey thinks Trumpism represents. According to Clavey, Löwenthal's book best explains the enduring appeal of Trumpism and offers the most striking historical insights into the movement.

Writing in The New Yorker, journalist Nicholas Lemann states the post-war Republican Party ideology of fusionism, a fusion of pro-business party establishment with nativist, isolationist elements who gravitated towards the Republican and not the Democratic Party, later joined by Christian evangelicals "alarmed by the rise of secularism", was made possible by the Cold War and the "mutual fear and hatred of the spread of Communism". An article in Politico has referred to Trumpism as "McCarthyism on steroids".

Championed by William F. Buckley Jr. and brought to fruition by Ronald Reagan in 1980, the fusion lost its glue with the dissolution of the Soviet Union, which was followed by a growth of income inequality in the United States and globalization that "created major discontent among middle and low income whites" within and without the Republican Party. After the 2012 United States presidential election saw the defeat of Mitt Romney by Barack Obama, the party establishment embraced an "autopsy" report, titled the Growth and Opportunity Project, which "called on the Party to reaffirm its identity as pro-market, government-skeptical, and ethnically and culturally inclusive."

Ignoring the findings of the report and the party establishment in his campaign, Trump was "opposed by more officials in his own Party ... than any Presidential nominee in recent American history," but at the same time he won "more votes" in the Republican primaries than any previous presidential candidate. By 2016, "people wanted somebody to throw a brick through a plate-glass window", in the words of political analyst Karl Rove. His success in the party was such that an October 2020 poll found 58% of Republicans and Republican-leaning independents surveyed considered themselves supporters of Trump rather than the Republican Party.

=== Illiberalism and parallels with fascism ===
The V-Dem Institute said in 2026 regarding Trump's presidency that "the speed with which American democracy is currently dismantled is unprecedented in modern history". The institute noted executive overreach undermining the rule of law, suppression and intimidation of media and dissenting voices, loss of legislative constraints, and declining civil rights, equality, and freedom of expression.

Beginning in October 2025, The New York Times editorial board published an Autocracy Index showing erosion of US democracy using various benchmarks, offering "a way to understand how much Mr. Trump is eroding American democracy" since his January 2025 inauguration.

Though Trump said in September 2025 that "the radicals on the left are the problem" with political violence, cumulatively over decades, most extremist killings in the US have been caused by right-wing perpetrators. From 2022 through 2024, all 61 political killings were committed by right-wing extremists.

Over decades, right wing ideologically motivated homicides have substantially outnumbered those perpetrated by left wing perpetrators in the US. Also, far-right motivated homicides have occurred much more frequently than jihadi violence inspired by Islamic extremism (not shown in chart).

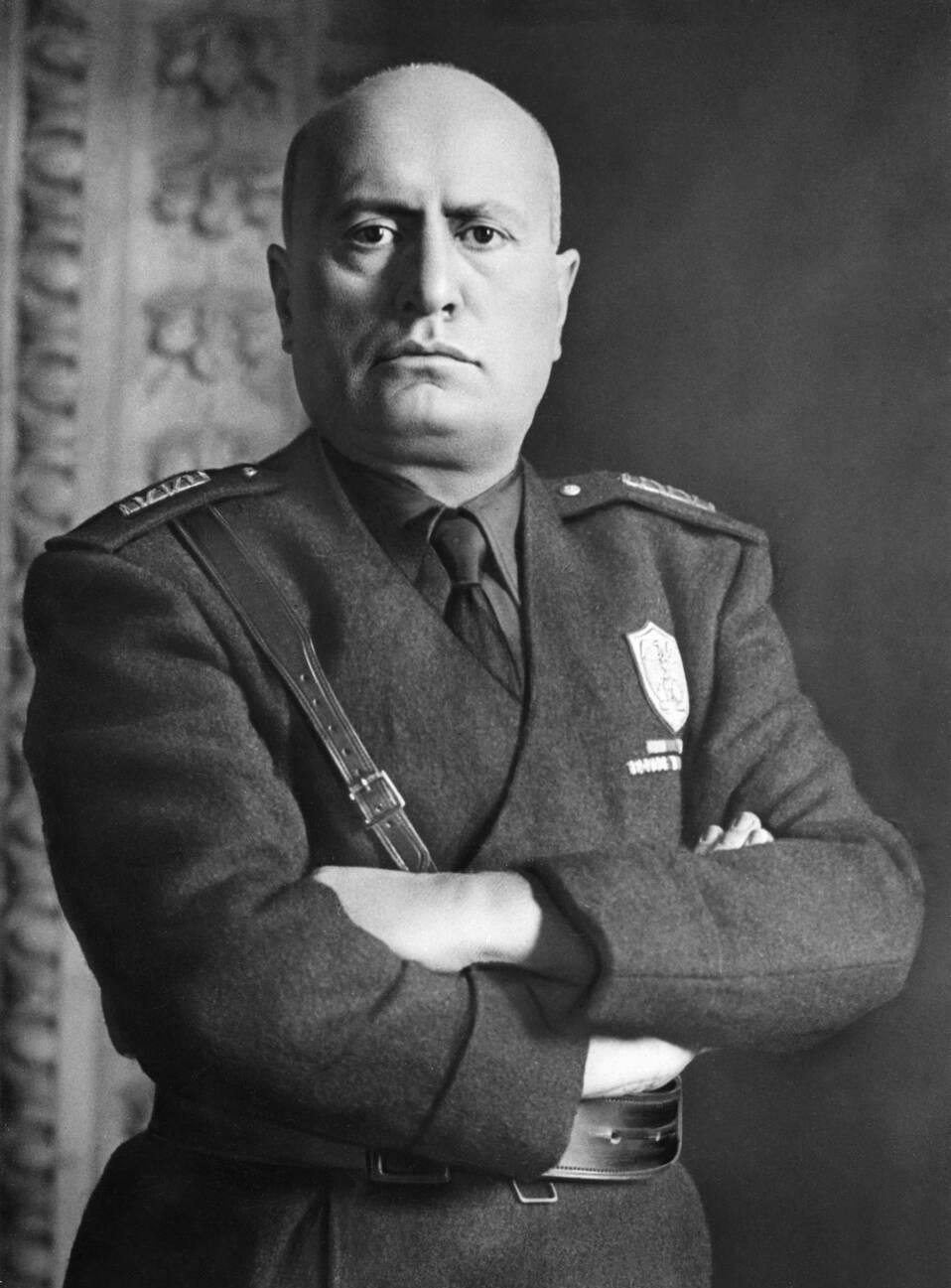
Historians and election experts have compared Trump's anti-democratic tendencies and egotistical personality to the sentiments and rhetoric of Benito Mussolini and Italian fascism.

Trumpism has been likened to Benito Mussolini's Italian fascism by critics of Trump, (Note: Attributed to multiple sources: Matthews 2021; Robertson 2020; Hasan 2020; Urbinati 2020; Shenk 2016) and significant academic debate exists over the prevalence of fascism and neo-fascism within Trumpism. (Note: Attributed to multiple sources: Adler et al. 2022; Shapiro, Intagliata & Venkat 2021; "Trump's world: The new nationalism". The Economist. November 19, 2016. Archived from the original on August 24, 2018.; "The growing peril of national conservatism". The Economist. February 15, 2024. Archived from the original on February 15, 2024.; Rushkoff 2016; Goldberg 2016: "To listen to both his defenders and critics, Donald Trump represents the U.S. version of a new nationalism popping up around the world."; Beauchamp 2019; Butler 2016; Chomsky 2020; Berkeley News 2020; Badiou 2019, p. 19; Giroux 2021; Traverso 2017, p. 30; Tarizzo 2021, p. 163; Ibish 2020; Cockburn 2020; Drutman 2021; West 2020; Gorski 2019; Benjamin 2020; Morris 2019, p. 10; McGaughey 2018; Tarizzo 2021, p. 163; Jackson 2021, pp. 1–3; Maher 2023, pp. 392, 395; Kagan 2016; McGaughey 2018; Foster 2017) (Note: Cornel West uses the term neofascist. Badiou describes Trump signaling the birth of a "new fascism" or "democratic fascism", while Traverso prefers the term post-fascist to describe "new faces of fascism" such as Trump who advance a model of democracy "that destroys any process of collective deliberation in favour of a relationship that merges people and leader, the nation and its chief." By contrast, Tarizzo describes Trump as part of what Pier Paolo Pasolini called new fascism employing a "political grammar" analysis which shares similar perspectives on ties between new fascism and dystopian economics argued in the analyses of Giroux, West, Hedges and Badiou. Chomsky instead uses the term authoritarianism. Such authors as Laruelle call this ideology illiberalism, noting its relation to the far-right or its "(pre-)fascist" character without the "wholesale return" to the 20th century fascism (Hendrikse).) Historians and election experts have compared Trump's anti-democratic tendencies and egotistical personality to the sentiments and rhetoric of Mussolini and Italian fascism. Several scholars reject comparisons with fascism, instead viewing Trump as authoritarian and populist.

Some commentators have rejected the populist designation for Trumpism and view it instead as part of a trend towards a new form of fascism or neo-fascism, with some referring to it as explicitly fascist and others as authoritarian and illiberal; some authors use illiberalism as a category for such movements resembling fascism but defined by contemporary era and not giving a "wholesale return" to the interwar fascism. (Note: Attributed to multiple sources: Butler 2016; Chomsky 2020; Berkeley News 2020; Badiou 2019, p. 19; Giroux 2021; Traverso 2017, p. 30; Tarizzo 2021, p. 163; Ibish 2020; Cockburn 2020; Drutman 2021; West 2020) Others have more identified it as a form of mild fascism specific to the US. Some historians, including many employing new fascism to describe Trumpism, (Note: Giroux notes that "Trump is not Hitler in that he has not created concentration camps, shut down the critical media or rounded up dissidents; moreover, the United States at the current historical moment is not the Weimar Republic." Tarizzo writes that both paleofascism and new fascism undermine the fundamentals of modern democracy, but the new mode of fascism "does not do this by absolutizing popular sovereignty at the expense of individual rights. New fascism celebrates our freedoms and absolutizes human rights to the detriment of our sense of belonging to a social-political community.") write of the hazards of direct comparisons with European fascist regimes of the 1930s, stating that while there are parallels, there are important dissimilarities. (Note: For a wide ranging review and critique of the use of the term fascist to describe Trump as of late 2017, see Carl Boggs' postscript chapter in his book Fascism Old and New.)

Historian Robert Paxton changed his opinion about whether the democratic backsliding caused by Trumpism is in line with fascism. In 2017, Paxton believed it bore greater resemblance to plutocracy. Paxton changed his opinion following the January 6 United States Capitol attack, stating it is "necessary" to understand Trumpism as a form of fascism. Drawing on Umberto Eco's essay Ur-Fascism, which outlines 14 characteristics of fascism, Bret Devereaux discusses how Trumpism satisfies all 14. Sociologist Dylan John Riley calls Trumpism "neo-Bonapartist patrimonialism" because it does not capture the same mass movement appeal of classical fascism.

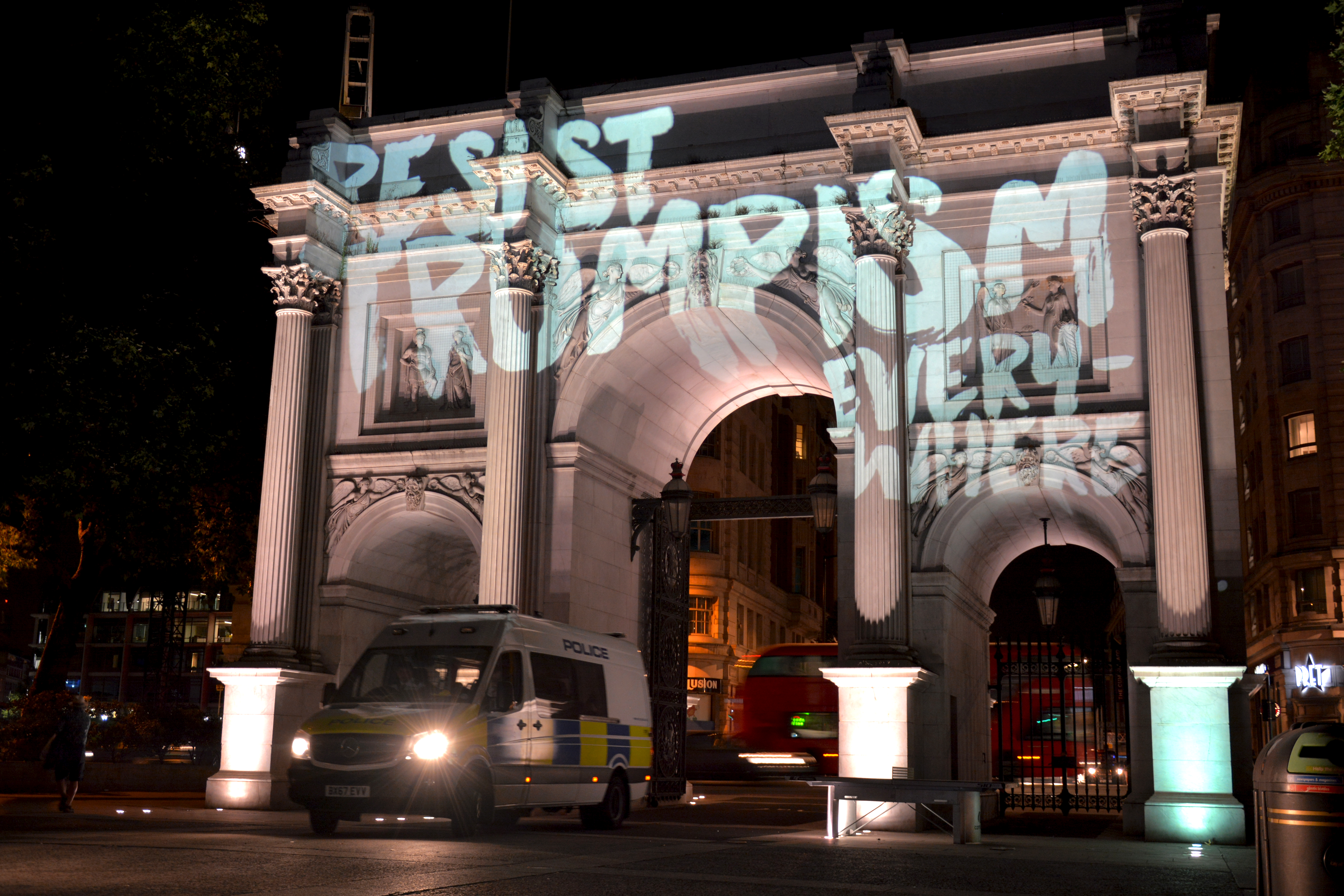
Activist group SumOfUs's Projection of "Resist Trumpism Everywhere" on London's Marble Arch as part of protests during Trump's July 2018 visit

Federico Finchelstein believes intersections exist between Peronism and Trumpism in terms of their disregard for the political system. Christopher Browning considers the long-term consequences of Trump's policies and support which he receives from the Republican Party to be dangerous for democracy. In the German-speaking debate, the term "fascism" initially appeared sporadically, in connection with the crisis of confidence in politics and the media, and described the strategy of right-wing politicians who wish to stir up this crisis to profit from it. German literature has a more diverse range of analysis of Trumpism. (Note: Consider the titles of papers listed in Koch, Lars; Nanz, Tobias; Rogers, Christina, eds. (2020). "The Great Disruptor". The Great Disruptor—Über Trump, die Medien und die Politik der Herabsetzung. doi:10.1007/978-3-476-04976-6. ISBN 978-3-476-04975-9. S2CID 226426921.)

Others have argued that Trump is a totalitarian capitalist exploiting the "fascist impulses of his ordinary supporters that hide in plain sight." Michelle Goldberg compares Trumpism to classical fascist themes. (Note: Yale's Jason Stanley observed that while Trump is not a fascist, "I think you could legitimately call Trumpism a fascist social and political movement" and that "he's using fascist political tactics. I think there's no question about that. He is calling for national restoration in the face of humiliations brought on by immigrants, liberals, liberal minorities, and leftists. He's certainly playing the fascist playbook." Philosopher Cornel West agrees that Trump has fascist proclivities and claims his popularity signals that neo-fascism is displacing neoliberalism in the United States. Harvard historian Charles Clavey thinks the authors of the Frankfurt School (Max Horkheimer, Theodor Adorno and Herbert Marcuse) who studied the sudden victory of fascism in Germany offer the best insights into Trumpism. These similarities include the rhetoric of self-aggrandizement, victimhood, accusation, and his solicitation of unconditional support to return the country from moral and political decay.) The "mobilizing vision" of fascism is of "the national community rising phoenix-like after a period of encroaching decadence which all but destroyed it", which "sounds a lot like MAGA" (Make America Great Again) according to Goldberg. Similarly, like Trumpism, fascism sees a "need for authority by natural chiefs (always male), culminating in a national chieftain who alone is capable of incarnating the group's historical destiny." They believe in "the superiority of the leader's instincts over abstract and universal reason".

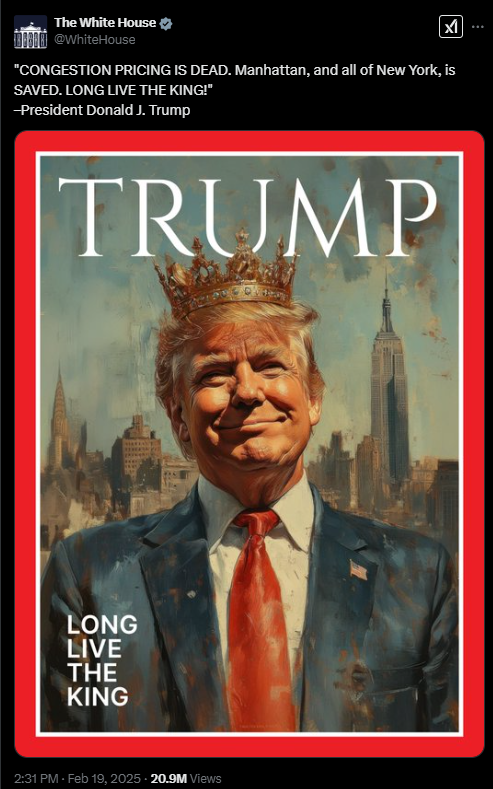
Image posted on February 19, 2025, by the official White House account likening Trump to a monarch with the phrase LONG LIVE THE KING. The post was made shortly after Trump had taken several actions that were apparent violations of federal law and the Constitution, and quoted Napoleon, saying "He who saves his Country does not violate any Law".

Conservative columnist George Will considers Trumpism similar to fascism, stating that Trumpism is "a mood masquerading as a doctrine". Will argues that national unity is based "on shared domestic dreads"—for fascists the "Jews", for Trump the media ("enemies of the people"), "elites" and "globalists". Solutions come not from tedious "incrementalism and conciliation", but from the leader (who claims "only I can fix it") unfettered by procedure. The political base is kept entertained with mass rallies, but inevitably the strongman develops a contempt for those he leads. (Note: David Livingstone Smith, a scholar of history, psychology and anthropology, compares Trump and the fascist pattern of persuasion described by Roger Money-Kyrle, who witnessed fascist rallies in 1930s Germany. The psychological linkage between the leader and supporters in mass protests, the melancholia-paranoia-megalomania pattern, recitation of shared domestic dreads, promotion of fear-mongering conspiracy theories painting out-groups as the cause of the problems, simplified solutions presented in absolute terms and the promotion of singular leader capable of returning the country to its former greatness.) Will argues both are based on machismo, and in the case of Trumpism, "appeals to those in thrall to country-music manliness: 'We're truck-driving, beer-drinking, big-chested Americans too freedom-loving to let any itsy-bitsy [COVID-19] virus make us wear masks.'" (Note: Described as "the sociologist who studied Trump's base before Trump", Michael Kimmel examined the relationship between masculinity and radicalization of pre-Trump supporters. In his 2018 book Healing from Hate: How Young Men Get Into—and Out of—Violent Extremism Kimmel describes a theme he "came to call 'aggrieved entitlement', a sense of righteous indignation, of undeserved victimhood in a world suddenly dominated by political correctness. The rewards these white men felt had been promised for a lifetime of, as they saw it, playing by the rules that someone else had established had suddenly dried up—or, as they saw it, the water had been diverted to far less deserving 'others'" who "were not worthy of the rewards they were now reaping, because 'they' were not 'real men.'")

In How to Lose a Country: The 7 Steps from Democracy to Dictatorship, Ece Temelkuran describes Trumpism as similar to rhetoric and actions of the Turkish politician Recep Tayyip Erdoğan. These are right-wing populism, demonization of the press, subversion of well-established and proven facts through the big lie, democratic backsliding such as dismantling judicial and political mechanisms; portraying systematic issues such as sexism or racism as isolated incidents, and crafting an ideal citizen.

Mark Blyth and Jonathan Hopkin believe similarities exist between Trumpism and similar movements towards "illiberal democracies" worldwide, but that Trumpism is not merely being driven by revulsion, loss, and racism. They argue that on the right and left, the global economy is driving the growth of neo-nationalist coalitions which find followers who want to be free of the constraints which are being placed on them by establishment elites whose members advocate neoliberal economics and globalism. Such authors as Marlene Laruelle also write that the Trumpist project is similar to the movements of "illiberal democracy" like Viktor Orban's Fidesz in Hungary, but from this continue that the movements called illiberal are similar in their ideological package which includes a right-wing to far-right and authoritarian rejection of liberal democracy in favour of a nominally democratic "majoritarian, nation-centric or sovereigntist" state based on "traditional hierarchies and cultural homogeneity" of the nation. Authors of the Routledge Handbook of Illiberalism like András Sajó and Ruzha Smilova support this assessment, adding that illiberalism as an ideology also tends to victimize the nation and avenge the perceived humiliations to restore "national authenticity" and "national pride", making the country "Great Again", and concentrate power within the personalist on Caesarist leader representing the "lost authentic [national] community." Authors like Hendrikse in contrast to Blyth and Hopkin note that such movements may be called "neo-illiberalism" in the way that they mix illiberal nationalism in politics with neoliberal economic princples, adding that such movements are born from radicalized formerly center-right parties - like the Republican party of the U.S.

Others emphasize the lack of interest in finding real solutions to the social malaise which has been identified, and they believe those individuals and groups who are executing policy are actually following a pattern which has been identified by researchers like Leo Löwenthal and Norbert Guterman as originating in the post-World War II work of the Frankfurt School of social theory. Based on this perspective, books such as Löwenthal and Guterman's Prophets of Deceit offer insights into how movements like Trumpism dupe their followers by perpetuating their misery and preparing them to move further towards an illiberal form of government.

Soon after the assassination of Charlie Kirk, Trump claimed that "the radicals on the left are the problem" with political violence. Opinion editors, as well as both far-right commentators and Trump critics, have compared Charlie Kirk's killing to the Reichstag fire—the 1933 arson of the German parliament building that Hitler used as a pretext to suspend civil liberties and prosecute political opposition—some calling Kirk's killing Trump's "Reichstag fire moment". How Democracies Die author, professor Steven Levitsky, said that exploiting Charlie Kirk's killing to justify unleashing attacks on critics is "page one of the authoritarian playbook".

Trump's "enemy from within" remarks and threats to use the National Guard and military against "radical left lunatics" during the 2024 campaign and the aftermath of the Charlie Kirk assassination (especially the remarks of Stephen Miller) prompted historians Wendy Goldman and Timothy Snyder to compare these events to the Great Purge in the Soviet Union of the 1930s. At that time, an assassination prompted Joseph Stalin to proclaim vast non-existent conspiracies; to redefine dissent as terrorism and treason; to encourage people to inform on dissenters; and to engage in a campaign of prosecution, imprisonment, and execution of hundreds of thousands of political opponents.

=== Principal scholars ===
Laura K. Field in her 2025 book titled The Making of the MAGA New Right has tried to indicate the intellectual brain trust supporting Trump's Project 2025 movement by identifying and documented the top 35 participants in the New Right movement which encompasses Claremonters, Postliberals, National Conservatives and the Hard Right. The list is presented as including the following participants some or whom are retired or deceased as of 2025, listed as:

- Sohrab Ahmari, Postliberal and journalist.
- Costin Alamariu, Hard Right and Yale PhD.
- Michael Anton, author under "Publius Decius Mus" moniker.
- Larry P. Arnn, Claremonter and Claremont PhD.
- Steve Bannon, Hard Right and Trump strategist.
- Darren Beattie, Hard Right and Duke PhD.
- Allan Bloom, died 1992 and leading Straussian.
- Tucker Carlson, Hard Right and journalist at Fox News.
- Charles Cornish-Dale, Hard Right, and Oxford and Cambridge graduate.
- Chris Demouth, National Conservative and formerly with AEI.
- Patrick Deneen, Postliberal and Professor at Notre Dame.
- Ron Desantis, Governor of Florida.
- John C. Eastman, Claremonter and Director at Claremont Institute.
- Samuel T. Francis, died 2005 and Paleoconservative.
- Robert P. George, Leading Catholic intellectual at Princeton University.
- Paul Gottfried, Paleoconservative and writer.
- Josh Hammer, National Conservative and University of Chicago JD.
- Yoram Hazony, National Conservative and author of The Virtue of Nationalism (2018).
- Harry V. Jaffa, died 2015 and West Coast Straussian.
- Leo Strauss, died 1973, Professor University of Chicago, patriarch of Straussians.

=== Rush Limbaugh ===
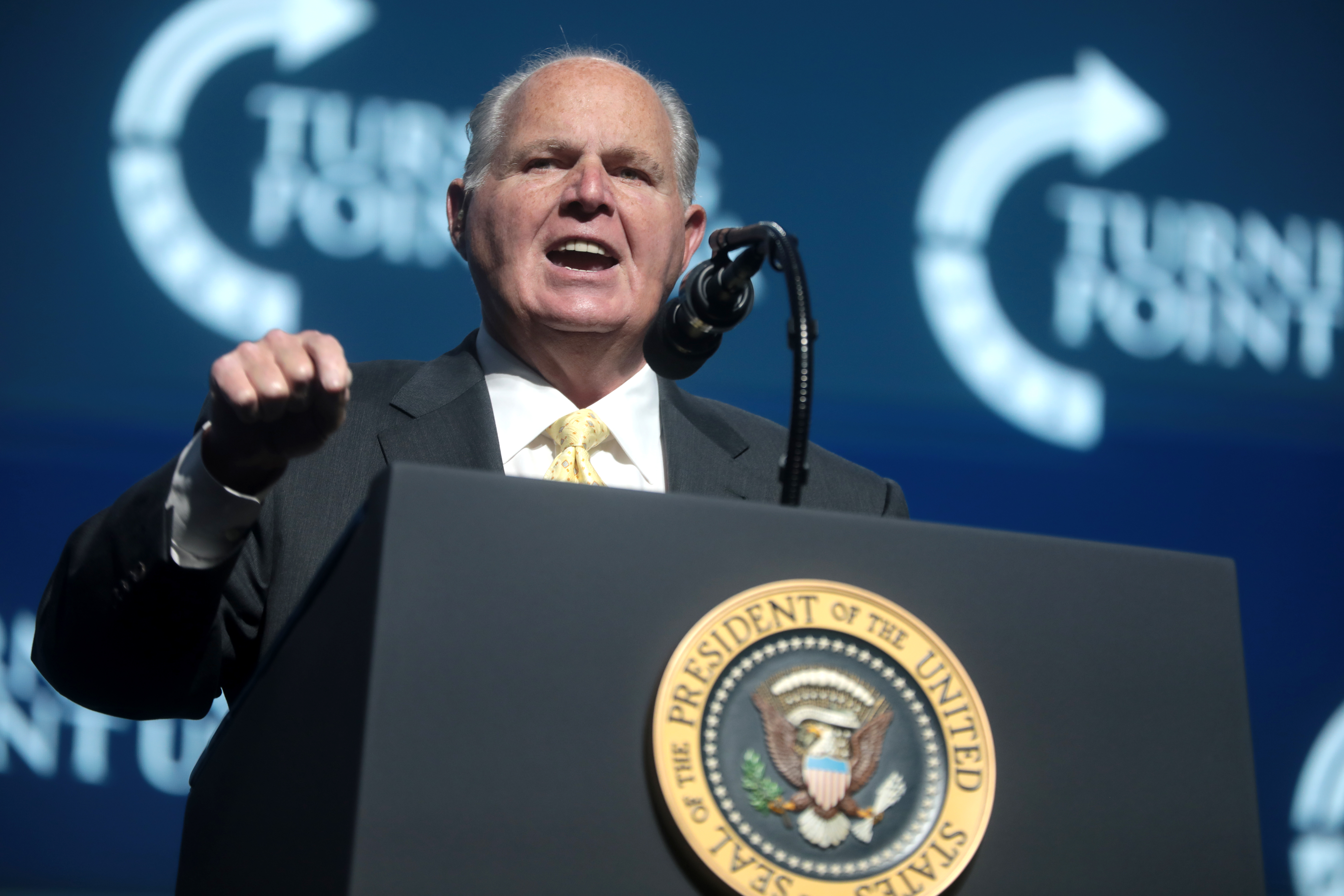
Rush Limbaugh speaking in West Palm Beach in 2019

Trump is considered by some analysts to be following a blueprint of leveraging outrage, which was developed on partisan cable TV and talk radio shows such as the Rush Limbaugh radio show—a style that transformed talk radio and American conservative politics decades before Trump. Both shared "media fame" and "over-the-top showmanship", and built an enormous fan base with politics-as-entertainment, attacking political and cultural targets in ways that would have been considered indefensible and beyond the pale in the years before them. Both featured "the insults, the nicknames", and conspiracy theories. Both maintained that global warming was a hoax, that Barack Obama was not a natural-born U.S. citizen, and that the danger of COVID-19 was vastly exaggerated. Both mocked people with disabilities.

Limbaugh, to whom Trump awarded the Presidential Medal of Freedom in 2020, preceded Trump in moving the Republican Party away from "serious and substantive opinion leaders and politicians", towards political provocation, entertainment, and anti-intellectualism, and popularizing and normalizing for "many Republican politicians and voters" what before his rise "they might have thought" but would have "felt uncomfortable saying". (Note: Quotes are from Brian Rosenwald, described as "a Harvard scholar who tracks disinformation in talk radio.") His millions of fans were intensely loyal and "developed a capacity to excuse ... and deflect" his statements no matter how offensive and outrageous, "saying liberals were merely being hysterical or hateful. And many loved him even more for it."

Trump has been additionally compared, at different levels, to the former Iranian President Mahmoud Ahmadinejad. "There was a joke in Iran during Trump’s first term that when he became president, Iran finally managed to export its revolution," according to Vali Nasr. Saeed Rahnema of the York University argues that their popularity is "the most worrying sign of social degradation at a global level".

=== Future impact ===
Writing in The Atlantic, Yaseem Serhan states Trump's post-impeachment claim that "our historic, patriotic, and beautiful movement to Make America Great Again has only just begun" should be taken seriously as Trumpism is a "personality-driven" populist movement, and other such movements—such as Berlusconism in Italy, Peronism in Argentina and Fujimorism in Peru, "rarely fade once their leaders have left office". Joseph Lowndes, a professor of political science at the University of Oregon, argued that while current far-right Republicans support Trump, the faction rose before and will likely exist after Trump. Bobby Jindal and Alex Castellanos wrote in Newsweek that separating Trumpism from Donald Trump himself was key to the Republican Party's future following his loss in the 2020 United States presidential election. However, Trump went on to win the 2024 United States presidential election with victories in all seven crucial swing states.

In 2024, President Kevin Roberts of the Heritage Foundation stated that he sees the role of Heritage as "institutionalizing Trumpism." Stating in June 2025 that "'The Age of Trump' Enters Its Second Decade", Peter Baker of The New York Times wrote "In those 10 years, Mr. Trump has come to define his age in a way rarely seen in America, more so than any president of the past century other than Franklin D. Roosevelt and Ronald Reagan".

== Policies ==
=== Economic policy ===
Trumpism "promises new jobs and more domestic investment". Trump's hard line against export surpluses of American trading partners and protectionist trade policies led to a tense situation in 2018 with mutually imposed tariffs by the United States and the European Union versus China. Trump secures the support of his political base emphasizing neo-nationalism and criticism of globalization. One book suggested that Trump "radicalized economics" for white working- to middle-class voters by implying that "undeserving [minority] groups are getting ahead while their group is being left behind."

=== Foreign policy ===
In terms of foreign policy in the sense of Trump's "America First", unilateralism and isolationism has usually been preferred to a multilateral policy. National interests are particularly emphasized, especially in the context of economic treaties and alliance obligations. Trump has shown a disdain for traditional American allies such as Canada as well as transatlantic partners NATO and the European Union. Conversely, Trump has shown sympathy for autocratic rulers, such as Russian President Vladimir Putin, whom Trump often praised even before taking office, and during the 2018 Russia–United States Summit. The "America First" foreign policy includes promises by Trump to end American involvement in foreign wars, notably in the Middle East, while also issuing tighter foreign policy through sanctions against Iran, among other countries. Trump's proposals during his second presidency to expand the United States by acquiring Canada, Greenland, and the Panama Canal were described by CNN as part of his nationalist "America First" agenda and having "modern echoes of the 19th century doctrine of Manifest Destiny". The proposal to acquire Greenland would eventually trigger the Greenland crisis.

In June 2025, some supporters of Donald Trump in the United States, including Steve Bannon, Tucker Carlson, Rand Paul, Charlie Kirk, Saagar Enjeti, Mollie Hemingway and Marjorie Taylor Greene, criticized Trump's support for Israeli strikes against Iran and opposed possible United States involvement in the war. There is a significant divide within the Republican Party and the MAGA movement on whether the United States should get involved in such a war overseas. For example, Marjorie Taylor Greene said that the United States shouldn't get involved at all in foreign matters. In 2026, Trump intervened in Venezuela and began a war with Iran; leading many observers to doubt the sincerity of Trump's commitment to isolationism and non-interventionism.

=== Religious policy ===
Trump wove Christian religious imagery into his 2024 presidential campaign, characterizing it as a "righteous crusade" against "atheists, globalists and the Marxists". He stated that his aims included restoring the United States "as one nation under God with liberty and justice for all".

Trump has been critical of what he sees as a persecution of Christians. On February 6, following the National Prayer Breakfast, he signed an executive order to create a task force to "immediately halt all forms of anti-Christian targeting and discrimination within the federal government, including at the DOJ, which was absolutely terrible, the IRS, the FBI — terrible — and other agencies". Donald Trump appointed Attorney General Pam Bondi to lead the task force and appointed Paula White to direct the White House Faith Office.

== Beyond the United States ==
=== Argentina ===
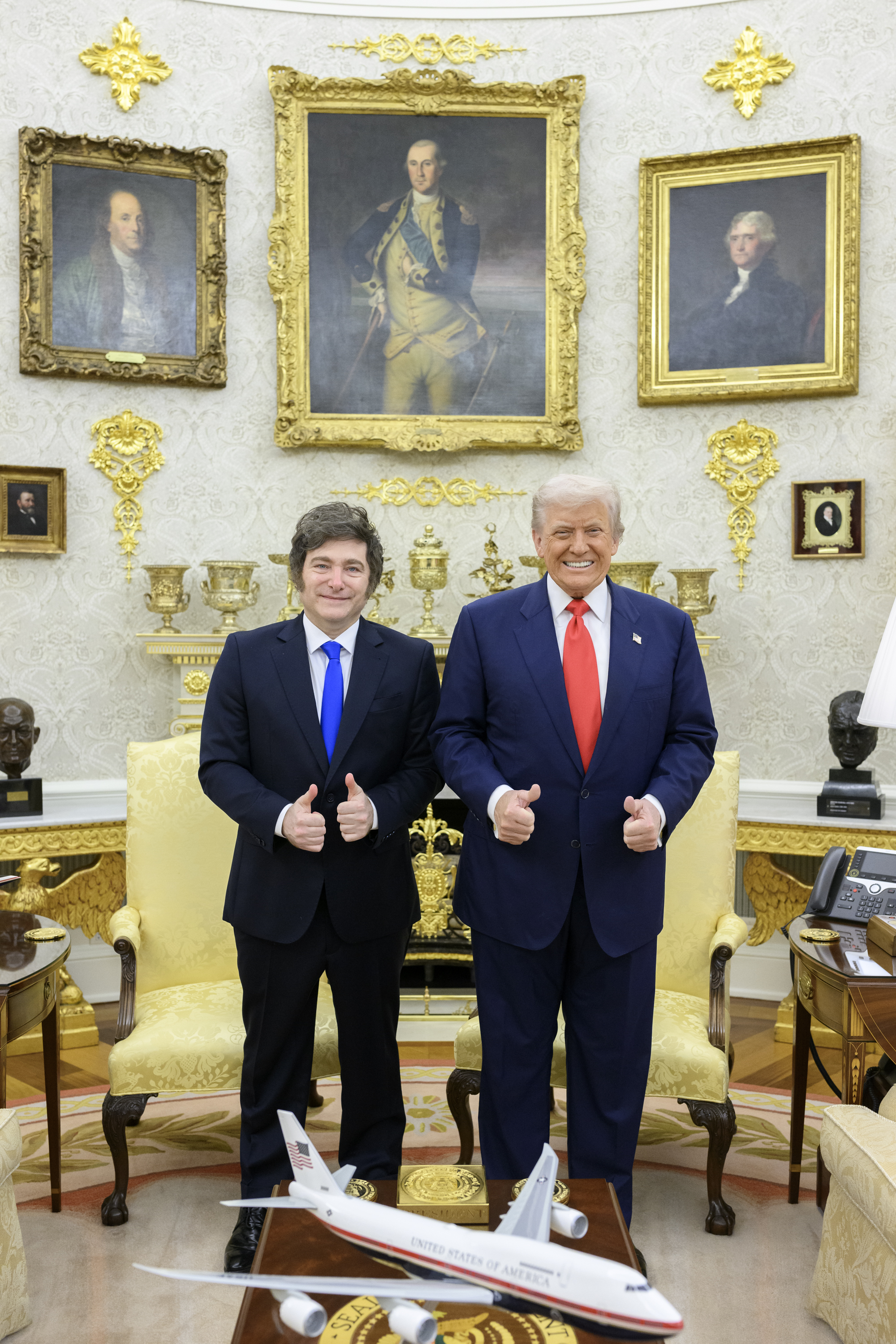
President Trump standing together with President Milei (October 2025)

Javier Milei, an Argentinian Austrian economist who was elected in 2023 as president of Argentina, has sometimes been likened to Donald Trump. Many other commentators have stressed that the two men are different, however, describing Milei's views as mostly libertarian, such as rejecting protectionism and supporting free trade.

=== Australia ===
In Australia, right-wing populist figure Pauline Hanson and her political party One Nation has often been compared to Donald Trump in political ideology and tactics. Comparisons include her anti-immigrant rhetoric and antagonism towards news media. Hanson attended the Conservative Political Action Conference at Mar-a-Lago in November 2025 in which she made a speech praising the Trump administration for deporting immigrants, bombing alleged drug cartel boats and for supporting mining projects. She also claimed climate change was "this century's greatest hoax" in the speech.

Trumpism was represented in Australia during the 2025 federal election by the political party Trumpet of Patriots, founded in 2021. The party has pledged to "put Australians first and make Australia great again". It focuses on "gender, changing the immigration policy, bringing down the cost of living and free speech." Following the party's failure to gain a single seat in the 2025 federal election, the party was renamed to Australian Federation Party.

=== Brazil ===
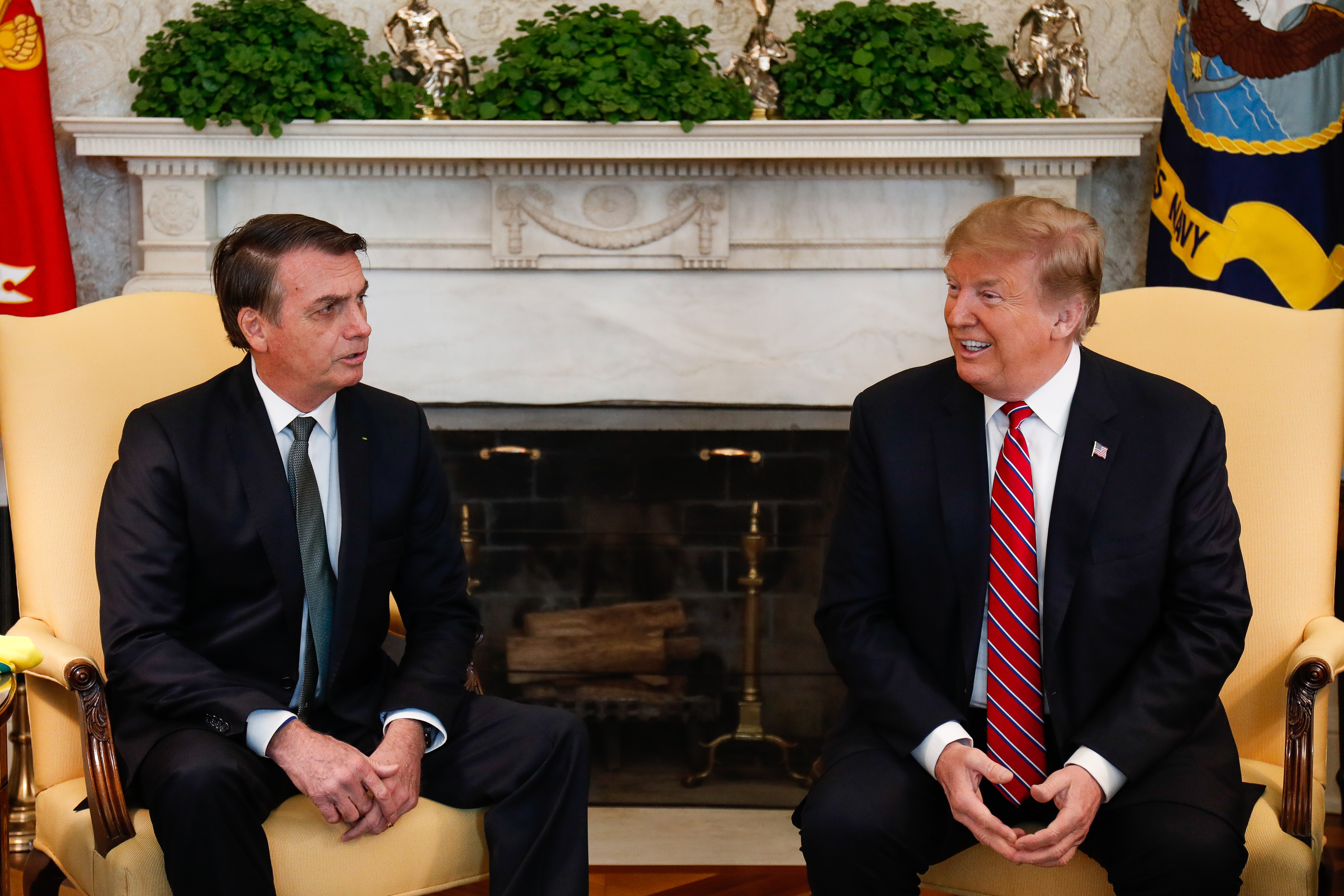
President Trump standing together with President Bolsonaro (March 2019)

In Brazil, Jair Bolsonaro, sometimes referred to as the "Brazilian Donald Trump", who is often described as a right-wing extremist, sees Trump as a role model and according to Jason Stanley uses the same fascist tactics. Like Trump, Bolsonaro finds support among evangelicals for his views on culture war issues. Along with allies he publicly questioned Joe Biden's vote tally after the 2020 United States presidential election.

=== Canada ===
Trumpism exists as a political current in Canada. (Note: Attributed to multiple sources: Delacourt 2020; Donolo 2021; Fawcett 2021; Donolo 2020; Global 2021; Fournier 2021) Law professor Allan Rock, Canada's former attorney general and ambassador to the U.N., said Trump had "given expression to an underlying frustration and anger, that arises from economic inequality, from the implications from globalisation." Rock stated that the "overtly racist behaviour" associated with Trumpism emboldened racists and white supremacists, resulting in a rise in the number of these organizations and hate crimes in Canada.

According to an October 2020 poll of Canadian voters, the number of "pro-Trump conservatives" was growing in Canada. Maclean's said this was influencing Canadian political campaigns. Erin O'Toole, the leader of the Conservative Party of Canada, featured the slogan—"Take Back Canada"—in a video, stating "[j]oin our fight, let's take back Canada." When asked if his "Canada First" policy was different from Trump's "America First" policy, O'Toole said, "No, it was not." O'Toole criticized what he considered to be Trumpism following one of Liberal Deputy Prime Minister Chrystia Freeland's tweets being flagged as "manipulated media" and compared her to Trump's flagged tweets, prior to Twitter's acquisition by Elon Musk. Writing for The Hill in 2021, Markik Von Rennenkampff stated that there are "striking differences" between the Conservative Party under Erin O'Toole and the Republican Party under Trump, notably O'Toole supporting access to abortion and his support for Canada's single-payer health care system. Rennenkampff also described Canadian Conservatives as "far more closely aligned with Democrats than Republicans".

Following the 2022 Conservative Party leadership election, some journalists have compared Conservative Party leader Pierre Poilievre to American Republicans such as Donald Trump and Ted Cruz; however many journalists have dismissed these comparisons due to Poilievre's pro-abortion access, pro-immigration, and pro-same-sex marriage positions. (Note: Attributed to multiple sources: "NP View: The unstoppable Pierre Poilievre". National Post. August 5, 2022. "Trying to demonize Poilievre as a "populist" or as Canada's Trump, or implying that he is a white supremacist or opposed to women's rights is unlikely to succeed. He is pro-choice, pro-immigration and has forcefully denounced white replacement theory and all of "that kind of thinking.""; Forrest 2022: "He has been compared to former President Donald Trump for his populist overtures, but in terms of substance, he has largely confined himself to pocketbook issues. He is pro-immigration — his wife is a Venezuelan immigrant — and now calls himself pro-choice."; McConkey 2022: "In several ways, Poilievre does not fit the mould of a new populist. For one, Poilievre is not new. He was a cabinet minister in the Stephen Harper government and he has been a member of Parliament for almost 20 years. For another, he is not your stereotypical reactionary. He is at ease with the non-traditional family, he is pro-choice, he is pro-immigration."; Campbell 2022: "But he is no Donald Trump in tenets or temperament. He doesn't echo the anti-immigrant rhetoric, and abhors Mr. Trump's gargantuan deficits. He is so calculated that he could never be the erratic bundle of impulses that rambles at a Trump rally."; "Canada's Conservatives pick a brainy brawler as leader". The Economist. September 15, 2022. "His rhetorical style evokes populists such as Donald Trump. But his enemies list is more circumscribed. Unlike Mr Trump, he favours immigration."; Moore, Samuel (November 4, 2022). "Pierre Poilievre: Canada's next Prime Minister?". Cherwell. "Moreover, in a way that distinguishes him from Trump and other right-wing populists, Poilievre's social policies are progressive. He is pro-choice and pro-LGBT rights and has actually criticised the Trudeau ministry for not being pro-immigration enough, belittling the inefficiencies of the current immigration system as yet another example of big government "gatekeeping"."; Oliver 2022: "The "Trump North" label has failed to stick because he has been consistently pro-choice, supports gay marriage and favours immigration."; Thomson 2022) In 2024, Zack Beauchamp of Vox stated that while Poilievre's rhetoric draws Trump comparisons, in terms of policy "he's actually considerably more moderate than Trump or European radicals".

During the 2025 Canadian federal election, Liberal Party of Canada staffers created Trump-style "Stop The Steal" buttons and were caught planting them at a Canada Strong and Free Network conference which was supporting the Conservative Party of Canada. In response, the Liberal Party spokesman Kevin Lemkay stated that such actions did not fit the prime minister's "commitment to serious and positive discourse" while Conservative Party spokesman Sam Lilly stated "it's clear that it's the Liberals who are attempting to bring American-style politics to our country".

=== Europe ===
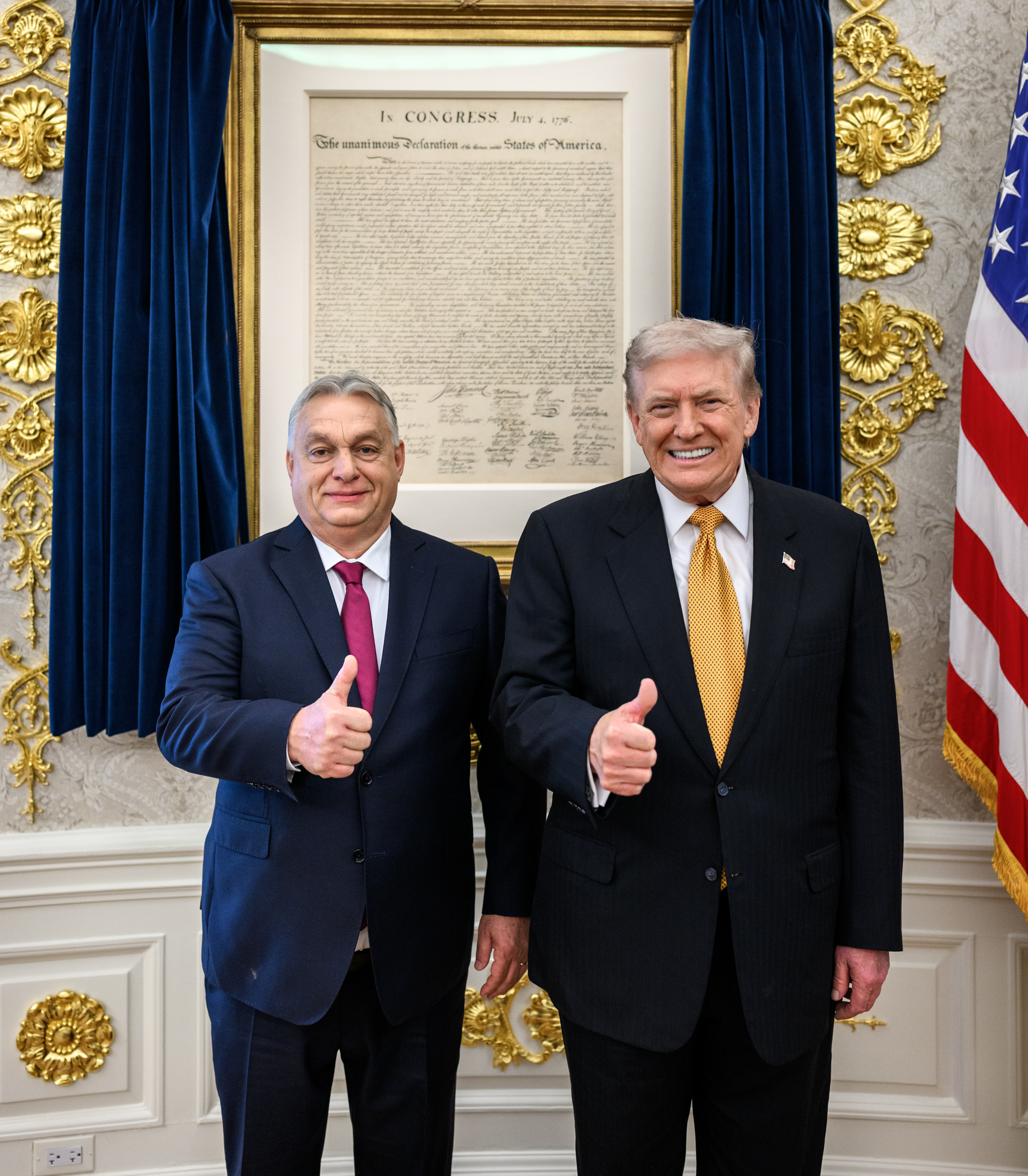
President Trump standing together with Prime Minister Orbán (November 2025)

Trumpism has also been said to be on the rise in Europe. Political parties such as the Finns Party, France's National Rally and Spain's far-right Vox party have been described as Trumpist in nature. Trump's former advisor Steve Bannon called Hungarian prime minister Viktor Orbán "Trump before Trump". Isabel Díaz Ayuso, member of the Spanish People's Party and president of the Community of Madrid, has also received the Trumpism label. George Simion, the founder of the Alliance for the Union of Romanians party and previous candidate in the 2025 Romanian presidential election is commonly referred to as the "Romanian Trump" due to his political style and ideological alignment being very similar to those of Donald Trump. A member of the AUR Alliance is the "Republican Party of Romania" which is heavily inspired by Trump. A Belgian political party named "TRUMP" in a backronym intentionally referencing Trump was founded in November 2025. Likewise in the June 2023 Greek parliamentary election, a party called "Republican Party of Greece – T.R.A.M.P." (Note: The Greek letter Α is used so it is pronounced the same way as Trump.) participated.

=== India ===
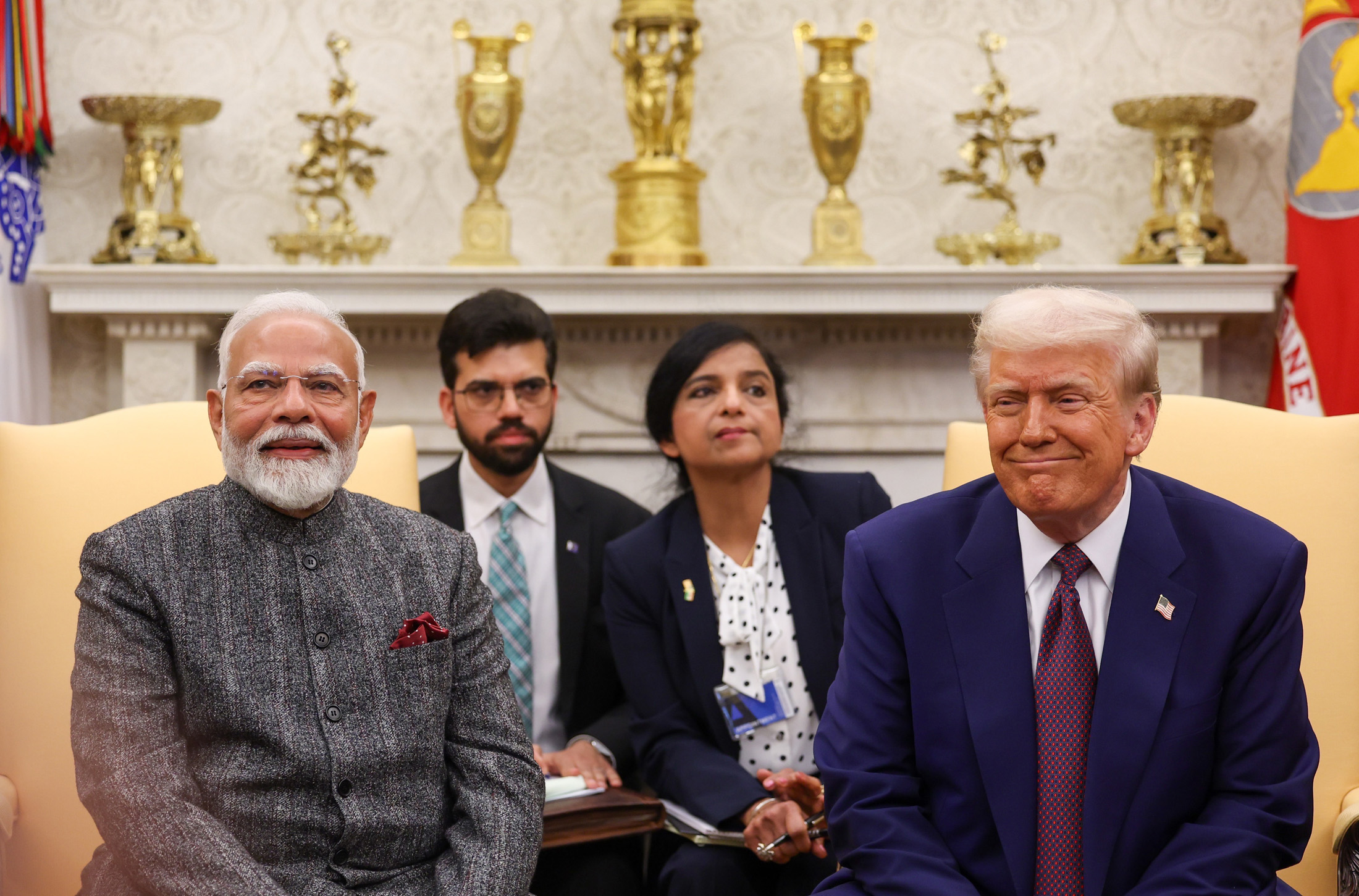
President Donald Trump in a meeting with Prime Minister Narendra Modi at the White House (February 2025)

At the February 2025 meeting between Narendra Modi, Prime Minister of India, and Donald Trump, the former stated:

Borrowing an expression from America, our vision for a developed India is to make India great again, or MIGA ... When America and India work together, that is, when it's MAGA plus MIGA, it becomes a mega partnership for prosperity. ... And it is this mega spirit that gives new scale and scope to our objectives.

=== Iran ===
Donald Trump and his policy towards Iran have been praised by the Iranian opposition group 'Restart', led by Mohammad Hosseini, which also supports American military action against Iran and offered to fight alongside Americans to overthrow the Iranian government. The group has adopted the slogan "Make Iran Great Again".

Restart has been compared to QAnon by Ariane Tabatabai, in terms of "conspiracist thinking going global". Among conspiracy theories advocated by the group is that Iran's Supreme Leader Ali Khamenei has died (or went into coma) in 2017 and a double plays his role in public.

=== Israel ===
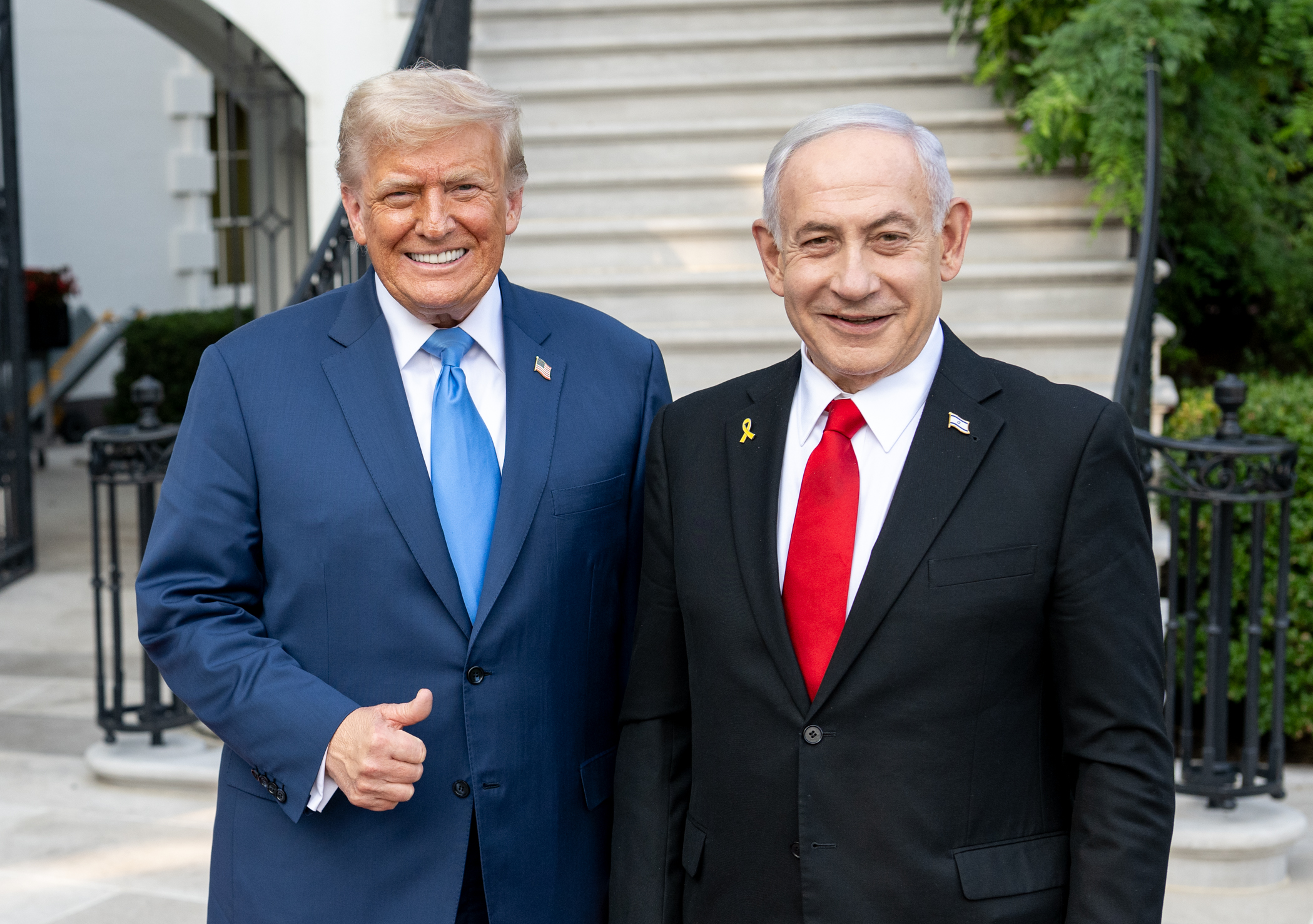
President Trump standing together with Prime Minister Netanyahu (July 2025)

Israeli Prime Minister Benjamin Netanyahu's political views, strategies, and actions are frequently compared to Trumpism by political analysts and critics, who view the two leaders as mirror images pioneering populist methods to dominate domestic politics. Both leaders have been described as utilizing authoritarian rhetoric that taps into public unease and relies on existential fear, deploying distinct "bogeymen"—such as illegal immigrants for Trump and Arab citizens or external threats for Netanyahu—to mobilize their bases. This political style leverages high-stakes polarization to rally core supporters while demonstrating that norm-breaking behavior carries little political cost among swing voters.

A central parallel lies in their shared hostility toward independent state institutions and the mainstream media. Netanyahu has closely emulated Trump's rhetoric by repeatedly denouncing critical journalistic coverage as "fake news", while his supporters have directed intense hostility toward both domestic and foreign press. Furthermore, both figures have consistently attacked the legitimacy of their respective judicial systems, framing corruption investigations and constitutional checks as weaponized conspiracies by an elite "leftist Deep State" designed to thwart the people's will. Following controversial moves to dismiss independent professional officials, such as the Shin Bet domestic intelligence director Ronen Bar, Netanyahu explicitly linked his legal battles to Trump's, publicly declaring a shared struggle against institutional overreach. This rhetoric has trickled deeply into Israeli political discourse, culminating in public campaigns and ministerial demands to defy court rulings or seek external U.S. intervention against judges.

Beyond institutional battles, Netanyahu's administrative tactics have increasingly mirrored Trump's governance style, particularly through targeted efforts to purge professional civil service ranks and slot loyalists into key national positions. This convergence also extends to their immediate families; analysts have noted that both leaders have sons—Donald Trump Jr. and Eric Trump in the U.S., and Yair Netanyahu in Israel—who actively engage in highly aggressive, controversial social media warfare to attack political rivals and defend their fathers. In electoral campaigns, Netanyahu has further adopted Trumpian tactics by raising unsubstantiated claims of systemic voter fraud to delegitimize political opponents and justify restrictive polling measures.

In foreign policy, the alliance between Trump and Netanyahu has been characterized as deeply personalistic and transactional, rather than purely institutional. Netanyahu strongly aligned with Trump during his first term, successfully coaxing him to withdraw from the 2015 Iran nuclear deal in 2018. Following Trump's return to power in the 2024 election, Netanyahu saw a renewed opportunity for a comprehensive regional realignment. This ambition culminated in highly coordinated joint U.S.-Israeli military actions against Iran in early 2026. However, the relationship has also exposed the transactional vulnerabilities inherent to Trumpism; when joint operations failed to trigger immediate regime collapse in Tehran and resulted in global economic disruption, notable tensions emerged, with Trump publicly rebuking Netanyahu and unilaterally imposing strict military constraints on Israeli operations.

=== Japan ===
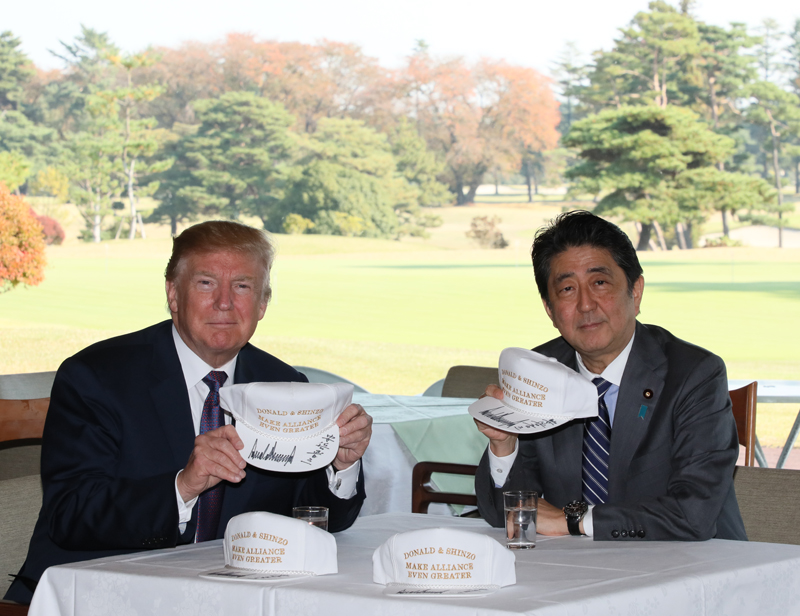
U.S. President Donald Trump and Japanese Prime Minister Shinzo Abe in November 2017 with "MAGA"-style hats reading "Donald & Shinzo, Make Alliance Even Greater"

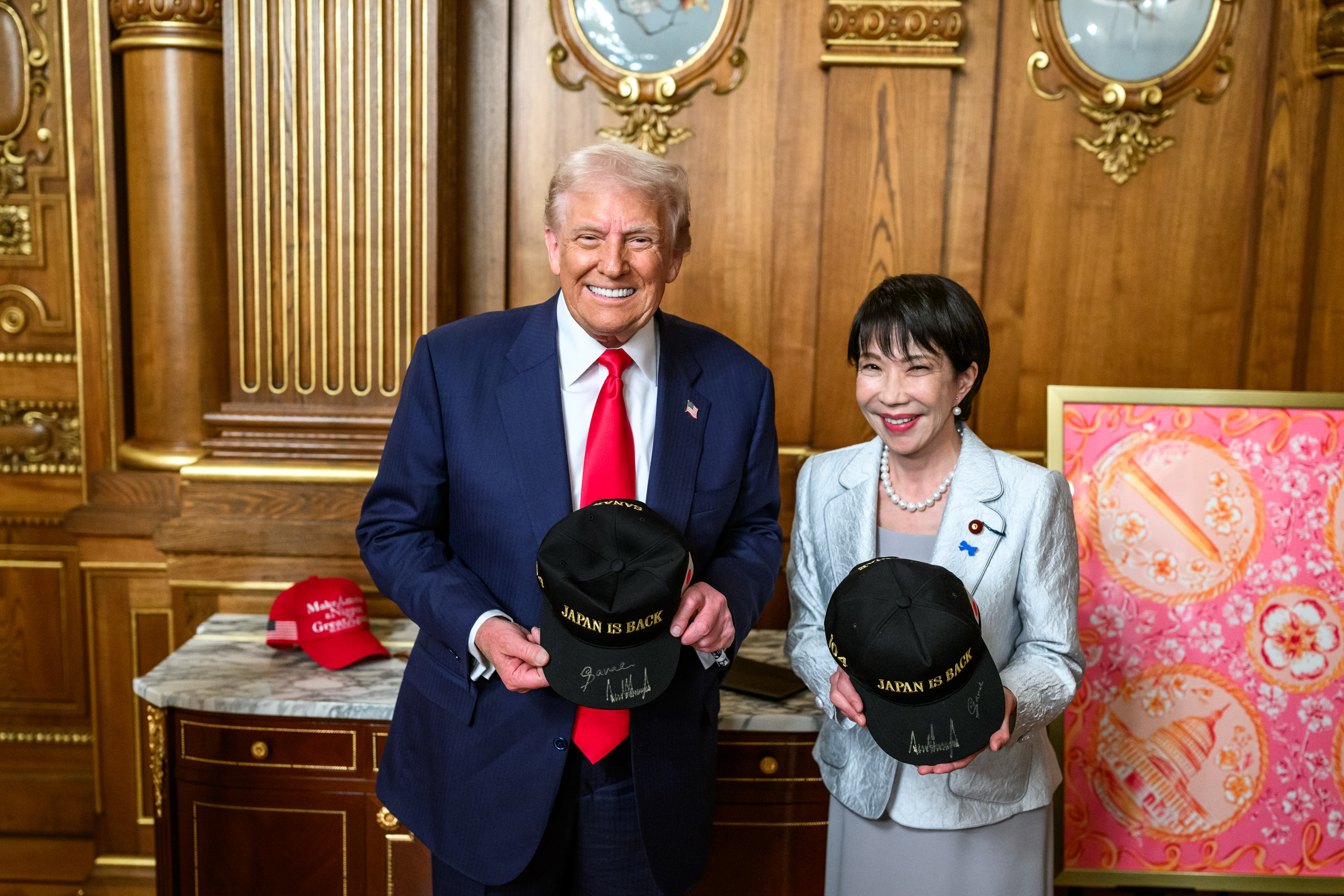
U.S. President Donald Trump and Japanese Prime Minister Sanae Takaichi in October 2025 with "MAGA"-style hats reading "Japan is back"

In Japan, in a speech to Liberal Democratic Party lawmakers in Tokyo on March 8, 2019, Steve Bannon said that Prime Minister Shinzo Abe was "Trump before Trump" and "a great hero to the grassroots, the populist, and the nationalist movement throughout the world." Shinzo Abe was described as a "right-wing nationalist" or "ultra-nationalist", but whether he was a "populist" is controversial.

Netto-uyoku is the term used to refer to netizens who espouse ultranationalist far-right views on Japanese social media. Netto-uyoku are typically very friendly not only to Japanese nationalists but also to Donald Trump, and oppose liberal politics. They began spreading Trump's conspiracy theories in an attempt to overturn the 2020 American presidential election.

=== Nigeria ===
According to The Guardian and The Washington Post, there is a significant affinity towards Trump in Nigeria. Donald Trump's comments on the ethno-religious conflicts between Christians and the predominantly Muslim Fulani tribe has contributed to his popularity among Christians in Nigeria, in which he stated: "We have had very serious problems with Christians who are being murdered in Nigeria. We are going to be working on that problem very, very hard because we cannot allow that to happen". Donald Trump is praised by the Indigenous People of Biafra (IPOB), a secessionist group that supports the independence of Biafra from Nigeria and is designated as a terrorist group by the Nigerian government. IPOB has claimed that he "believes in the inalienable right of an indigenous people to self-determination" and it also praised him for "the direct and serious manner he addressed and demanded immediate end to the serial slaughter of Christians in Nigeria, especially Biafran Christians".

After Trump's victory in the 2016 presidential election, IPOB leader Nnamdi Kanu wrote a letter to Trump stating he had a "historic and moral burden ... to liberate the enslaved nations in Africa". As Trump was inaugurated in January 2017, IPOB organized a rally in support of Trump that resulted in violent clashes with Nigerian security forces and resulted in multiple deaths and arrests. On January 30, 2020, IPOB leader Nnamdi Kanu attended a Trump rally in Iowa as a special VIP guest, at the invitation of the Republican Party of Iowa. According to a 2020 poll from Pew Research, 58% of Nigerians had favorable views of Donald Trump, the fourth highest percentage globally.

According to John Campbell of Council on Foreign Relations, Trump's popularity in Nigeria can be explained by a "manifestation of the widespread disillusionment in a country characterized by growing poverty, multiple security threats, an expanding crime wave, and a government seen as unresponsive and corrupt", and his popularity is likely stronger among wealthier urban Nigerians rather than the majority of Nigerians who live in rural areas or urban slums and are unlikely to have strong opinions on Trump.

=== Philippines ===
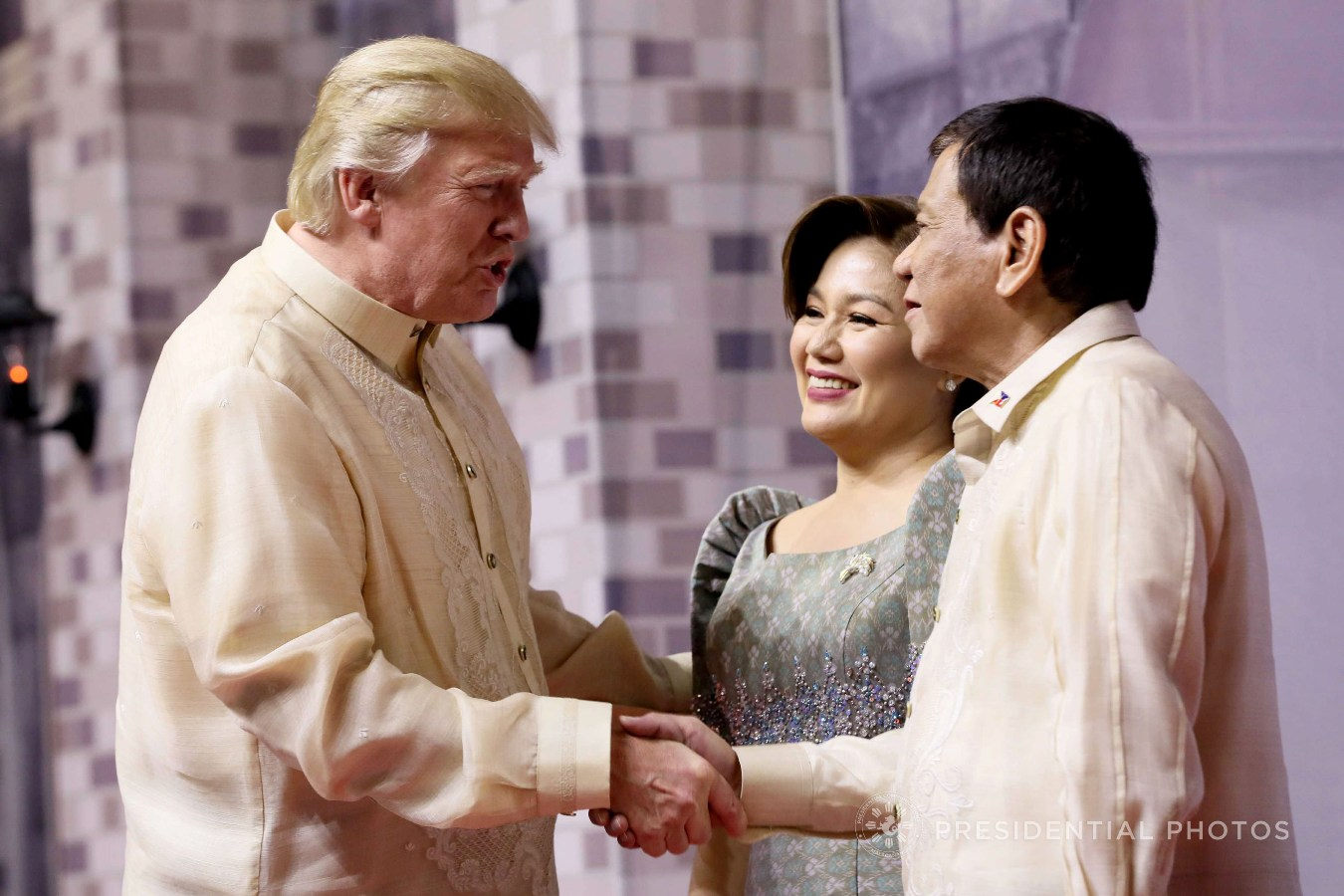
President Trump shakes hands with President Duterte (November 2017).

Sheila S. Coronel has argued that the political strategies of Ferdinand Marcos, who was president of the Philippines from 1965 to 1986, and Rodrigo Duterte, who held the same position from 2016 to 2022, share certain features with Trumpism, including disregard for facts, encouragement of fear, and a "loud, bombastic, hypermasculine" aesthetic; and that each has benefited from uncertain political environments.

=== Russia ===
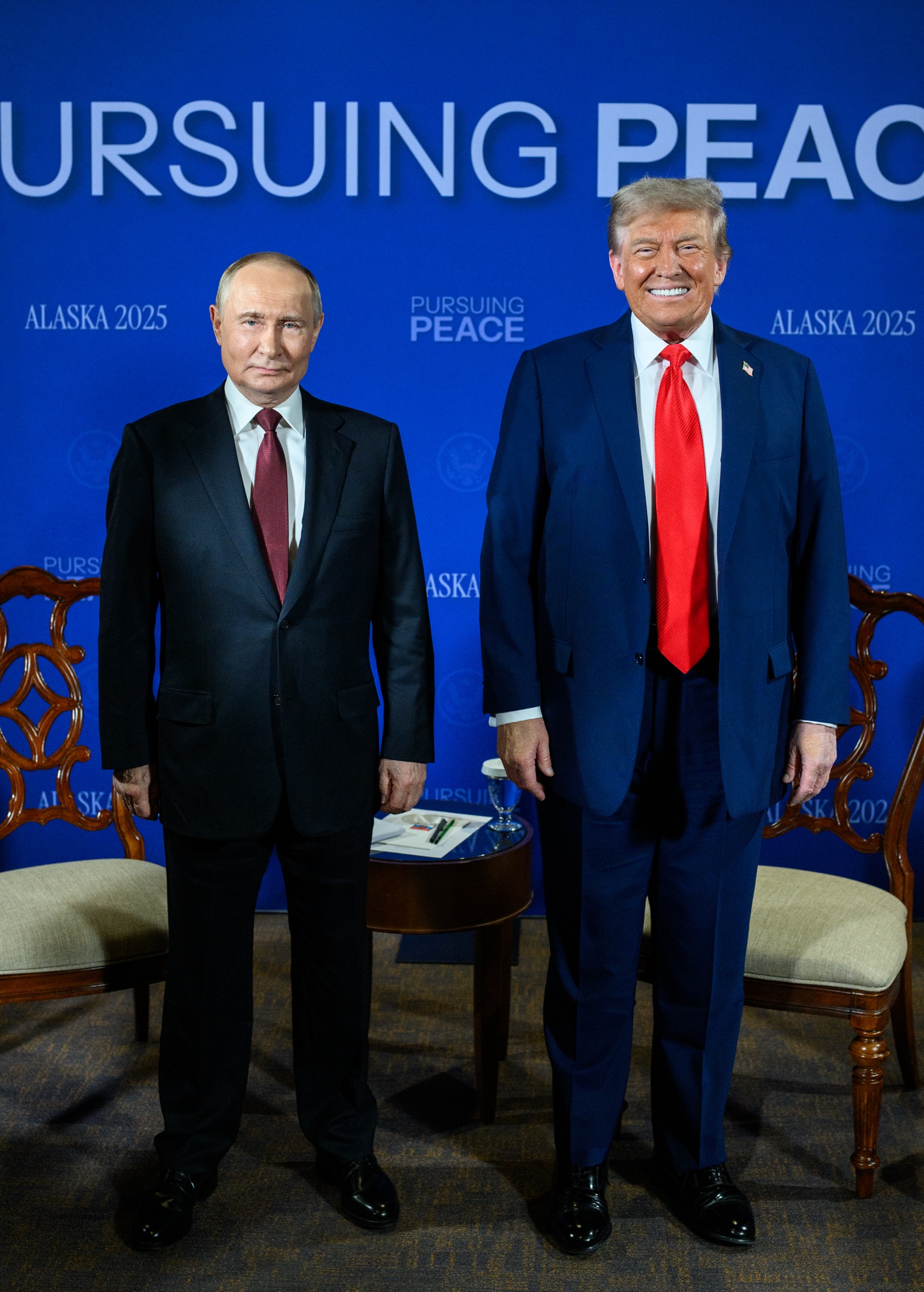
President Trump standing together with President Putin (August 2025)

Aleksandr Dugin, a Russian far-right political philosopher has described the political style of the incumbent Russian President Vladimir Putin as similar to Donald Trump due to their anti-globalist and anti-elite rhetoric in emphasizing nationalism and traditional values with Putin framing Russia as a defender against Western liberal elites, while Trump criticizes global institutions and claims they undermine American interests.

=== South Korea ===
The politics of Yoon Suk Yeol, the former president of South Korea, has been called "Trumpist" for his right-wing populist elements.

== Public opinion ==
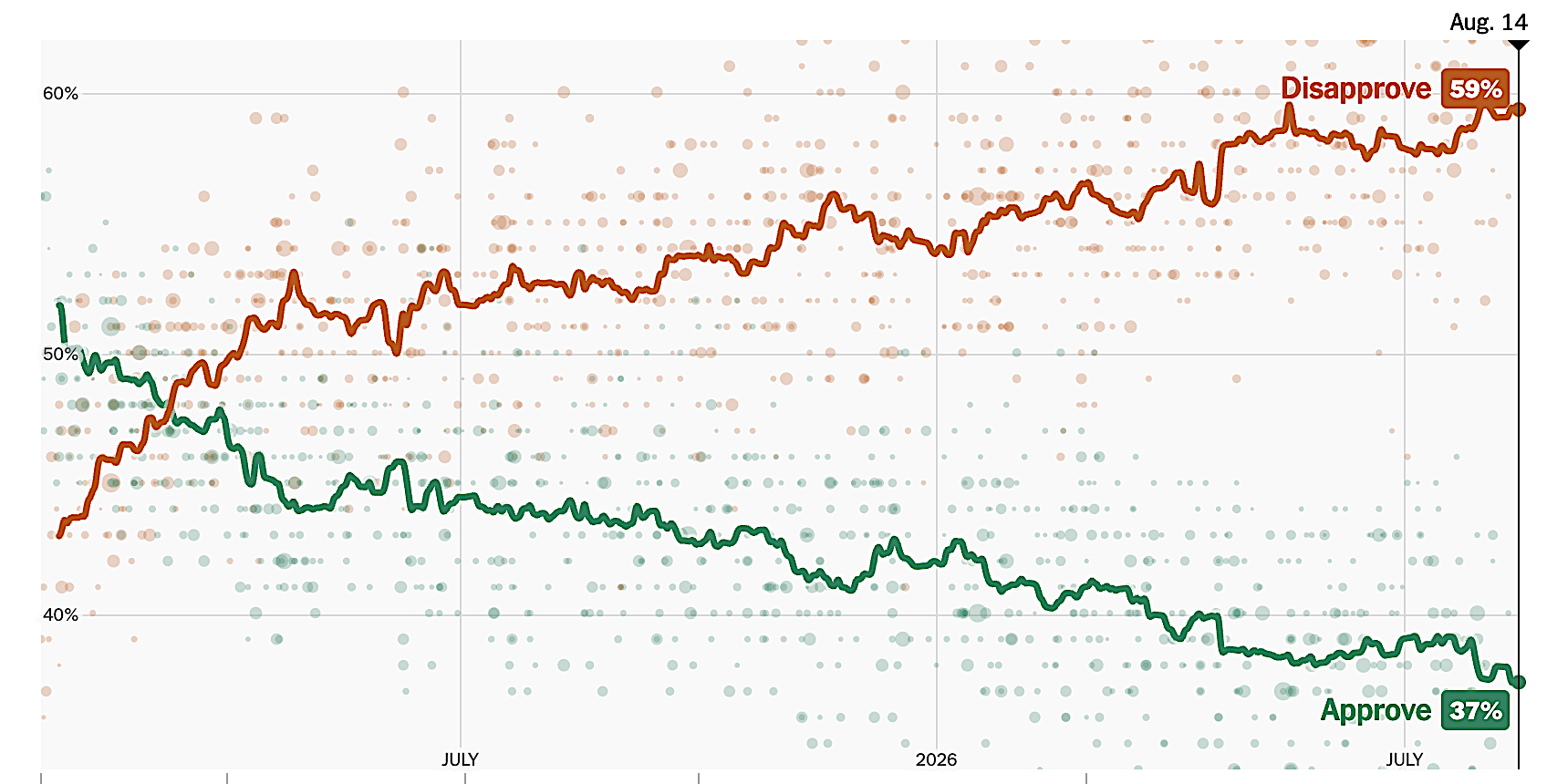
Trump's aggregated presidential approval ratings, with more disapproval ratings than approval ratings two months after his election, and disapproval ratings rising to over 50% after three months

In a larger context, Trump's approval rating (Gallup polling) after the first year of his second term was the lowest of any president since 1977.

== See also ==
- Agenda 47 – Policy platform of the 2024 Donald Trump campaign
- Authoritarian conservatism – Political ideology
- Blue MAGA
- Corporatocracy – Society controlled by business corporations
- Corruption in the United States
- Diversity, equity, and inclusion policies of the second Trump administration
- Enemy of the people – Designation for political opponents of ruling power
- Firehose of falsehood – Propaganda technique
- Flood the zone
- Freedom Caucus – Republican US congressional caucus
- God Emperor Trump – 2019 Italian sculpture and float
- Historical negationism § United States history
- Kakistocracy – Government run by the least qualified
- Madman theory – Feature of U.S. president Richard Nixon's foreign policy
- Moral panic – Fear that some evil threatens society
- Owning the libs – Strategy of American conservatives
- Political positions of Donald Trump
- Project 2025 – Conservative political initiative in the United States
- Racial views of Donald Trump
- Radical right (United States) – Political preference that leans towards the far-right
- Reality distortion field – Use of charisma to affect the perceptions of others
- Right-wing authoritarianism – Interrelated attitudinal clusters
- Sedition Caucus – American political term
- Trumpet of Patriots – Right-wing political party in Australia

Organizations

- America First Policies – American political organization
- Conservative Partnership Institute – American political organization
- John Birch Society – American right-wing advocacy group
- MAGA Inc. – American political action committee
- Republican Accountability – Political initiative in the US
- Republicans for the Rule of Law – Conservative anti-Trump political group in the US
- The Lincoln Project – American political action committee against Trump

Similar ideologies

- Volkism
- Berlusconism
- Bibism
- Bolsonarism
- Cartismo
- Dutertismo
- Erdoğanism
- Fujimorism
- Hansonism
- Mileism
- Orbanism
- Pinochetism
- Putinism
- Thatcherism

== Bibliography ==
=== Books ===
- Abromeit, John (2018). "Frankfurt School Critical Theory and the Persistence of Authoritarian Populism in the United States". In Morelock, Jeremiah (ed.). Critical Theory and Authoritarian Populism. Critical Digital and Social Media Studies. Vol. 9. University of Westminster Press. pp. 3–28. doi:10.2307/j.ctv9hvtcf.5. JSTOR j.ctv9hvtcf.5.
- Andrews, David L. (2019). "Making Sport Great Again". Making Sport Great Again: The Uber-Sport Assemblage, Neoliberalism, and the Trump Conjuncture (e-book ed.). New York: Palgrave Macmillan. doi:10.1007/978-3-030-15002-0. ISBN 978-3-030-15002-0. S2CID 159089360.
- Badiou, Alain (2019). Trump (e-book ed.). Cambridge, UK: Polity Press. ISBN 978-1-5095-3609-2. "...we could speak of these new figures in terms of a kind of "democratic fascism", a paradoxical but effective designation. After all, the Berlusconis, the Sarkozys, the Le Pens, the Trumps, are operating inside the democratic apparatus, with its elections, its oppositions, its scandals, etc. But, within this apparatus, they are playing a different score, another music. This is certainly the case with Trump, who is racist, a male chauvinist, violent—all of which are fascist tendencies—but who, in addition, displays a contempt for logic and rationality and a muffled hatred of intellectuals. The music proper to this type of democratic fascism is a discourse that does not worry in the least bit about coherence, a discourse of impulse, comfortable with a few nighttime tweets, and that imposes a sort of dislocation of language, positively flaunting its ability to say everything and its opposite. For these new political figures, the aim of language is no longer to explain anything or to defend a point of view in an articulate manner. Its aim is to produce affects, which are used to create a fleetingly powerful unity, largely artificial but capable of being exploited in the moment."
- Berry, Jeffrey M.; Sobieraj, Sarah (2014). The Outrage Industry: Political Opinion Media and the New Incivility (e-book ed.). New York: Oxford University Press. ISBN 978-0-19-992897-2. Archived from the original on March 14, 2024.
- Blair, Gwenda (2000). The Trumps: Three Generations of Builders and a Presidential Candidate. New York: Simon & Schuster. ISBN 0-684-80849-8.
- Boggs, Carl (2018). Fascism Old and New (e-book ed.). New York: Routledge. p. xii. ISBN 978-1-351-04969-6. "At this juncture [November 2017] it is worth noting that the 2016 ascendancy of Donald Trump to the White House does not occur to the author as a specifically fascist moment in U.S. history, contrary to what is commonly heard in liberal and progressive circles. To be sure, Trump does possess strong elements of a leadership cult, replete with narcissism and grandiose visions ('making American great again') ... I have chosen to view Trump as representing an interregnum between existing power arrangements—that is, a militarized state-capitalism—and potential American fascism."
- Boler, Megan; Davis, Elizabeth (2021). "Affect, Media, Movement – Interview with Susanna Paasonen and Zizi Papacharissi". In Boler, Megan; Davis, Elizabeth (eds.). Affective Politics of Digital Media (e-book ed.). New York: Routledge. ISBN 978-1-003-05227-2.
- Boyd, Gregory (2005). The Myth of a Christian Nation: How the Quest for Political Power Is Destroying the Church. Grand Rapids, Michigan: Zondervan. ISBN 0-310-28124-5.
- Butler, Anthea (2020). White Evangelical Racism: The Politics of Morality in America. University of North Carolina Press. ISBN 978-1-4696-6117-9.
- Carpini, Michael X. Delli (2018). "Alternative Facts: Donald Trump and the Emergence of a New U.S. Media Regime". In Boczkowski, Pablo; Papacharissi, Zizi (eds.). Trump and the Media (e-book ed.). Cambridge, MA: MIT Press. ISBN 978-0-262-03796-9. Archived from the original on January 15, 2024.
- Connolly, William (2017). Aspirational Fascism: The Struggle for Multifaceted Democracy under Trumpism. Minneapolis, Minnesota: University of Minnesota Press. ISBN 978-1-5179-0512-5.
- Dean, John; Altemeyer, Robert A. (2020). "Chapter 10: National Survey on Authoritarianism". Authoritarian Nightmare: Trump and his Followers (e-book ed.). Brooklyn, New York: Melville House Publishing. ISBN 978-1-61219-906-1.
- de Berg, Henk (2024). Trump and Hitler: A Comparative Study in Lying. London: Palgrave Macmillan. ISBN 978-3-031-51832-4.
- de la Torre, Carlos; Barr, Robert R.; Arato, Andrew; Cohen, Jean L.; Ruzza, Carlo (2019). Routledge Handbook of Global Populism. Routledge International Handbooks. London & New York: Routledge. ISBN 978-1-315-22644-6.
- * DiMaggio, Anthony R. (2021). Rising Fascism in America (1st ed.). New York: Routledge. doi:10.4324/9781003198390-1. ISBN 978-1-003-19839-0.
- Dionne, E. J.; Mann, Thomas E.; Ornstein, Norman (2017). One Nation After Trump: A Guide for the Perplexed, the Disillusioned, the Desperate, and the Not-yet Deported. New York: St. Martin's Press. p. 384. ISBN 978-1-250-29363-3.
- Fea, John (2018). Believe Me: The Evangelical Road to Donald Trump. Grand Rapids, Michigan: Eerdmans. ISBN 978-1-4674-5046-1.
- Feldman, Stanley (2020). "Authoritarianism, threat, and intolerance". In Borgida; Federico; Miller (eds.). At the Forefront of Political Psychology: Essays in Honor of John L. Sullivan. Abingdon, England: Taylor & Francis. ISBN 978-1-000-76827-5. Archived from the original on February 15, 2021.
- Finchelstein, Federico (2017). From Fascism to Populism in History. University of California Press. pp. 11–13. ISBN 978-0-520-96804-2. Archived from the original on February 15, 2021.
- * Frum, David (2018). Trumpocracy. New York: Harper. p. 336. ISBN 978-0-06-279674-5.
- Fuchs, Christian (2018). Digital Demagogue: Authoritarian Capitalism in the Age of Trump and Twitter. London, England: Pluto Press. JSTOR j.ctt21215dw.8.
- Gordon, Peter E. (2018). "The Authoritarian Personality Revisited: Reading Adorno in the Age of Trump". In Brown, Wendy; Gordon, Peter E.; Pensky, Max (eds.). Authoritarianism: Three Inquiries in Critical Theory (e-book ed.). Chicago: University of Chicago Press. doi:10.7208/chicago/9780226597300.001.0001. ISBN 978-0-226-59730-0.
- Gorski, Philip (2019). "Why Evangelicals Voted for Trump: A Critical Cultural Sociology". In Mast, Jason L.; Alexander, Jeffrey C. (eds.). Politics of Meaning/Meaning of Politics. Cultural Sociology. Cham: Springer International Publishing. pp. 165–183. doi:10.1007/978-3-319-95945-0_10. ISBN 978-3-319-95945-0. S2CID 239775845. Archived from the original on February 14, 2022 – via Springer Link.
- Hart, Roderick P. (2020). "Trump's Arrival". Trump and Us (What He Says and Why People Listen). Cambridge, England: Cambridge University Press. pp. 3–22. doi:10.1017/9781108854979.001. ISBN 978-1-108-85497-9. S2CID 234899569.
- Hassan, Steven (2019). The Cult of Trump. New York: Simon & Schuster. ISBN 978-1-9821-2733-6.
- Hochschild, Arlie Russell (2016). Strangers in Their Own Land: Anger and Mourning on the American Right (e-book ed.). New York: The New Press. ISBN 978-1-62097-226-7.
- Hopkin, Jonathan; Blyth, Mark (2020). "Global Trumpism: Understanding Anti-System Politics in Western Democracies". In Vormann, Boris; Weinman, Michael D. (eds.). The Emergence of Illiberalism. Routledge. ISBN 978-0-367-36624-7. Archived from the original on February 15, 2021.
- Horkheimer, Max; Adorno, Theodor W. (2002) [1947]. Noerr, Gunzelin Schmid (ed.). Dialectic of Enlightenment – Philosophical Fragments. Cultural Memory in the Present. Translated by Jephcott, Edmund (e-book ed.). Stanford, California: Stanford University Press. ISBN 978-0-8047-8809-0.
- Jacquemet, Marco (2020). "45 as a Bullshit Artist: Straining for Charisma". In McIntosh, Janet; Mendoza-Denton, Norma (eds.). Language in the Trump Era: Scandals and Emergencies. Cambridge: Oxford University Press. doi:10.1017/9781108887410. ISBN 978-1-108-74503-1. S2CID 241149659. Archived from the original on April 20, 2021.
- Jeffress, Robert (2011). Twilight's Last Gleaming: How America's Last Days Can Be Your Best Days. Brentwood, Tennessee: Worthy Publishing. ISBN 978-1-936034-58-1.
- Jones, Karen (2013). "Trusting Interpretations". In Mäkelä, Pekka; Townley, Cynthia (eds.). Trust: Analytic and Applied Perspectives. Value Inquiry Book Series. Vol. 263. Rodopi. ISBN 978-94-012-0941-0.
- Jutel, Olivier (2019). "Donald Trump, American Populism and Affective Media". In de la Torre, Carlos; Barr, Robert R.; Arato, Andrew; Cohen, Jean L.; Ruzza, Carlo (eds.). Routledge Handbook of Global Populism. Routledge International Handbooks. London & New York: Routledge. ISBN 978-1-315-22644-6.
- Kaufmann, Eric (2018). Whiteshift: Populism, Immigration and the Future of White Majorities. New York City: Abrams Books. ISBN 978-146-831-697-1.
- Kellner, Douglas (2018). "Donald Trump as Authoritarian Populist: A Frommian Analysis". In Morelock, Jeremiah (ed.). Critical Theory and Authoritarian Populism. Vol. 9. London: University of Westminster Press. pp. 71–82. doi:10.2307/j.ctv9hvtcf.8. ISBN 978-1-912656-05-9. JSTOR j.ctv9hvtcf.8.
- Kellner, Douglas (2020). "Donald Trump and the Politics of Lying". In Peters, Michael A.; Rider, Sharon; Hyvonen, Mats; Besley, Tina (eds.). Post-Truth, Fake News: Viral Modernity & Higher Education. New York: Springer. doi:10.1007/978-981-10-8013-5. ISBN 978-981-10-8013-5.
- Kessler, Glenn; Rizzo, Salvador; Kelly, Meg (2020). Donald Trump and His Assault on Truth: The Presidents Falsehoods, Misleading Claims and Flat-Out Lie. The Washington Post Books. New York: Simon and Schuster. ISBN 978-1-9821-5108-9.
- Kimmel, Michael (2017) [2013]. Angry White Men: American Masculinity at the End of an Era (2017 ed.). New York: Perseus Books – PublicAffairs. ISBN 978-1-56858-962-6.
- Kimmel, Michael (2018). Healing from Hate: How Young Men Get Into – and Out of – Violent Extremism (e-book ed.). Davis, California: University of California Press. ISBN 978-0-520-96608-6.
- Kreiss, Daniel (2018). "The Media Are about Identity, Not Information". In Boczkowski, Pablo J.; Papacharissi, Zizi (eds.). Trump and the Media. Cambridge, Massachusetts: MIT Press. pp. 93–99. doi:10.7551/mitpress/11464.003.0016. ISBN 978-0-262-03796-9.
- Laclau, Ernesto (2005). On Populist Reason. New York: Verso. ISBN 978-1-78873-133-1.
- Le Bon, Gustave (2002) [1st pub. 1895]. The Crowd: A Study of the Popular Mind. Mineola, NY: Dover Publications. ISBN 978-0-486-41956-5.
- Lifton, Robert Jay (2019). Losing Reality: On Cults, Cultism, and the Mindset of Political and Religious Zealotry (ePub) ed.). New York: New Press. ISBN 978-1-62097-512-1. (Page numbers correspond to the ePub edition.)
- Löwenthal, Leo; Guterman, Norbert (1949). Prophets of Deceit: A Study of the Techniques of the American Agitator (PDF). New York: Harper & Brothers. ISBN 978-0-87015-182-8. Archived from the original on November 1, 2020.
- Lowndes, Joseph (2019). "Populism and race in the United States from George Wallace to Donald Trump". In de la Torre, Carlos (ed.). Routledge Handbook of Global Populism. London & New York: Routledge. "Trumpism" section, pp. 197–200. ISBN 978-1-315-22644-6. "Trump unabashedly employed the language of white supremacy and misogyny, rage and even violence at Trump rallies was like nothing seen in decades."
- Manno, Andrew (2020). ""Fight, Don't Fold": The Poker Mindset and the Rise of Trumpism". Toxic Masculinity, Casino Capitalism, and America's Favorite Card Game. London: Palgrave Macmillan. pp. 167–200. doi:10.1007/978-3-030-40260-0_6. ISBN 978-3-030-40259-4.
- Mansfield, Stephen (2017). Choosing Donald Trump: God, Anger, Hope, and Why Christian Conservatives Supported Him. Grand Rapids, Michigan: Baker Books. ISBN 978-1-4934-1225-9. Archived from the original on March 14, 2024.
- Martin, Ron; Gardiner, Ben; Pike, Andy; Sunley, Peter; Tyler, Peter (2021). Levelling Up Left Behind Places: The Scale and Nature of the Economic and Policy Challenge. London: Routledge. doi:10.4324/9781032244341. ISBN 978-1-032-24434-1.
- Massachs, Joan; Monti, Corrado; Morales, Gianmarco De Francisci; Bonchi, Francesco (2020). "Roots of Trumpism: Homophily and Social Feedback in Donald Trump Support on Reddit". 12th ACM Conference on Web Science. 12th ACM Conference on Web Science. pp. 49–58. arXiv:2005.01790. doi:10.1145/3394231.3397894. ISBN 978-1-4503-7989-2. S2CID 218502169.
- Mercieca, Jennifer R. (2020). Demagogue for President: The Rhetorical Genius of Donald Trump. Texas A&M University Press. ISBN 978-1-62349-906-8.
- McIntyre, Lee (2018). Post-Truth. MIT Press Essential Knowledge Series. Cambridge, Massachusetts: MIT Press. ISBN 978-0-262-53504-5.
- McAdams, Dan P. (2020). The Strange Case of Donald J. Trump: A Psychological Reckoning (EPUB ed.). New York: Oxford University Press. ISBN 978-0-19-750746-9.
- McManus, Matthew (2020). "The Rise of Post-Modern Conservatism". In Hardwick, David; Marsh, Leslie (eds.). The Rise Of Post-Modern Conservatism Neoliberalism, Post-Modern Culture, And Reactionary Politics (e-book ed.). New York: Palgrave MacMillan. doi:10.1007/978-3-030-24682-2. ISBN 978-3-030-24682-2. S2CID 241523759.
- Money-Kyrle, Roger (2015) [1941]. "The Psychology of Propaganda". In Meltzer, Donald; O'Shaughnessy, Edna (eds.). The Collected Papers of Roger Money-Kyrle. Clunie Press. "Money – Kyle describes not a rhetorical pattern of problem–conflict–resolution, but a progression of psychoanalytic states of mind in the three steps: 1) melancholia, 2) paranoia and 3) megalomania."
- Neuborne, Burt (2019). When at Times the Mob Is Swayed: A Citizen's Guide to Defending Our Republic (ePub) ed.). New York: The New Press. ISBN 978-1-62097-358-5.
- Norris, Pippa; Inglehart, Ronald (2019). Cultural Backlash. Trump, Brexit, and Authoritarian Populism. Cambridge: Cambridge University Press. ISBN 978-110-859-584-1.
- O'Callaghan, Patrick (2020). "Reflections on the Root Causes of Outrage Discourse on Social Media". In Navin, Mark Christopher; Nunan, Richard (eds.). Democracy, Populism, and Truth. AMINTAPHIL: The Philosophical Foundations of Law and Justice. Vol. 9. Springer. pp. 115–126. doi:10.1007/978-3-030-43424-3_9. ISBN 978-3-030-43424-3. S2CID 226512444.
- Oliver, Joe (September 7, 2022). "Liberals risk drowning in the Poilievre wave". Financial Post.
- Ophir, Adi (2020). "The Political". In Stoler, Ann Laura; Gourgouris, Stathis; Lezra, Jacques (eds.). Thinking With Balibar A Lexicon of Conceptual Practice. Idiom: Inventing Writing Theory. New York: Fordham University Press. pp. 158–182. doi:10.1515/9780823288502-012. ISBN 978-0-8232-8848-9. S2CID 150814728.
- Pfiffner, James (2020). "The Lies of Donald Trump: A Taxonomy". Presidential Leadership and the Trump Presidency (PDF). New York: Palgrave Macmillan. pp. 17–40. doi:10.1007/978-3-030-18979-2_2. ISBN 978-3-030-18979-2. S2CID 235085363. Archived (PDF) from the original on December 27, 2020.
- Plasser, Fritz; Ulram, Peter A. (2003). "Striking a Responsive Chord: Mass Media and. Right-Wing Populism in Austria". In Mazzoleni, Gianpietro; Stewart, Julianne; Horsfield, Bruce (eds.). The Media and Neo-Populism. Santa Barbara, CA: Praeger. ISBN 978-0-275-97492-3.
- Postman, Neil (2005) [1985]. Amusing Ourselves to Death: Public Discourse in the Age of Show Business (20th Anniversary ed.). New York: Penguin. ISBN 978-0-14-303653-1.
- Power, Samantha (2018). "Beyond Elections: Foreign Interference with American Democracy". In Sunstein, Cass R. (ed.). Can It Happen Here? Authoritarianism in America (ePub ed.). New York: Dey Street Books. pp. 69–80. ISBN 978-0-06-269621-2.
- Pybus, Jennifer (2015). "Accumulating affect: social networks and their archives of feeling". In Hillis, Ken; Paasonen, Susanna; Petit, Michael (eds.). Networked affect. Cambridge, Massachusetts: MIT Press. ISBN 978-0-262-02864-6.
- Resano, Dolores (2017). American Literature in the Era of Trumpism: Alternative Realities. Cham, Switzerland: Palgrave Macmillan. ISBN 978-3-030-73857-0.
- Robison, Wade L. (2020). "#ConstitutionalStability". In Navin, Mark Christopher; Nunan, Richard (eds.). Democracy, Populism, and Truth. AMINTAPHIL: The Philosophical Foundations of Law and Justice. Vol. 9. Springer. pp. 179–191. doi:10.1007/978-3-030-43424-3_13. ISBN 978-3-030-43424-3. S2CID 243147537. Archived from the original on January 15, 2024.
- Rudolf, Peter (2017). "The US under Trump: Potential consequences for transatlantic relations". In Heinemann-Grüder, Andreas (ed.). Peace Report 2017 (PDF). Vol. 29. Berlin/Münster/Zürich: LIT-Verlag, International Politics. ISBN 978-3-643-90932-9. Archived (PDF) from the original on February 15, 2021.
- Sexton, Jared Yates (2017). The People Are Going to Rise Like the Waters Upon Your Shore: A Story of American Rage. Berkeley, California: Counterpoint Press. ISBN 978-1-61902-956-9. Archived from the original on March 14, 2024.
- Schmidt, Michael S. (October 22, 2024). "As Election Nears, Kelly Warns Trump Would Rule Like a Dictator". The New York Times. ISSN 0362-4331.
- Shapiro, Ari; Intagliata, Christopher; Venkat, Mia (May 13, 2021). "The U.S. Is Headed Away From The Ideals Of Democracy, Says Author Masha Gessen". All Things Considered. NPR. Archived from the original on September 14, 2021.
- Smith, David Livingstone (2020). On Inhumanity: Dehumanization and How to Resist It (ePub ed.). New York: Oxford University Press. ISBN 978-0-19-092302-0.
- Sunstein, Cass (2007). Republic 2.0 (e-book ed.). Princeton, New Jersey: Princeton University Press. ISBN 978-0-691-13356-0.
- Stenner, Karen; Haidt, Jonathan (2018). "Authoritarianism is not a momentary madness, but an eternal dynamic within liberal democracies". In Sunstein, Cass R. (ed.). Can It Happen Here? Authoritarianism in America (ePub ed.). New York: Dey Street Books. ISBN 978-0-06-269621-2.
- Stoler, Ann Laura (2020). "Interior Frontiers". In Stoler, Ann Laura; Gourgouris, Stathis; Lezra, Jacques (eds.). Thinking With Balibar A Lexicon of Conceptual Practice. Idiom: Inventing Writing Theory. New York: Fordham University Press. pp. 117–139. doi:10.1515/9780823288502-010. ISBN 978-0-8232-8848-9. S2CID 243377812.
- Tarizzo, Davide (2021). Political grammars: the unconscious foundations of modern democracy. Square One: First Order Questions in the Humanities. Stanford, California: Stanford University Press. ISBN 978-1-5036-1532-8.
- Temelkuran, Ece (2019). How to Lose a Country: The 7 Steps from Democracy to Dictatorship. New York: HarperCollins. ISBN 978-0-00-834061-2.
- Thomson, Stuart (July 28, 2022). "One of the world's leading populism experts says Pierre Poilievre isn't quite a populist". The Hub.
- Traverso, Enzo (2017). The New Faces of Fascism. Brooklyn, New York: Verso Books. ISBN 978-1-78873-046-4. "'Populism' is a category used as a self-defence mechanism by political elites who stand ever further from the people. According to Jacques Rancière: "Populism is the convenient name under which is dissimulated the exacerbated contradiction between popular legitimacy and expert legitimacy, that is, the difficulty the government of science has in adapting itself to manifestations of democracy and even to the mixed form of representative system. This name at once masks and reveals the intense wish of the oligarch: to govern without people, in other words, without any dividing of the people; to govern without politics."
- Trump, Donald J.; Schwartz, Tony (2011) [1987]. Trump: The Art of the Deal. New York: Random House – Ballantine Books. ISBN 978-0-307-57533-3.
- Tucker, Erika (2018). "Hope, Hate and Indignation: Spinoza and Political Emotion in the Trump Era". In Sable, Marc Benjamin; Torres, Angel Jaramillo (eds.). Trump and Political Philosophy. London: Palgrave-Macmillan. pp. 131–157. doi:10.1007/978-3-319-74427-8_8. ISBN 978-3-319-74427-8. S2CID 149997363.
- van Prooijen, Jan-Willem (2018). The Psychology of Conspiracy Theories. The Psychology of Everything. New York: Routledge. ISBN 978-1-315-52541-9.
- Waisbord, Silvio; Tucker, Tina; Lichtenheld, Zoey (2018). "Trump and the Great Disruption in Public Communication". In Boczkowski, Pablo; Papacharissi, Zizi (eds.). Trump and the Media (e-book ed.). Cambridge: MIT Press. ISBN 978-0-262-03796-9.
- Woodward, Bob (2018). Fear: Trump in the White House. New York: Simon & Schuster. p. 448. ISBN 978-1-4711-8130-6.

=== Journal articles ===
- Adams, Kenneth Alan (Spring 2021). "The Trump Death Cult". Journal of Psychohistory. 48 (4): 256–276. ISSN 0145-3378.
- Adler, Paul S.; Adly, Amr; Armanios, Daniel Erian; Battilana, Julie; Bodrožić, Zlatko; Clegg, Stewart; Davis, Gerald F.; Gartenberg, Claudine; Glynn, Mary Ann; Gümüsay, Ali Aslan; Haveman, Heather A.; Leonardi, Paul; Lounsbury, Michael; McGahan, Anita M.; Meyer, Renate; Phillips, Nelson; Sheppard-Jones, Kara (2022). "Authoritarianism, Populism, and the Global Retreat of Democracy: A Curated Discussion" (PDF). Journal of Management Inquiry. 32 (1): 3–20. doi:10.1177/10564926221119395. S2CID 251870215. Archived (PDF) from the original on January 14, 2024. "The decoupling of the man from the movement suggests that authoritarianism can continue well beyond the authoritarian's rule. The most enduring vestige—apart from the democratic institutions attacked—is Trumpism. It has metastasized from Trump's delusional framing on his inauguration day in 2017—with the biggest crowds ever—to a widespread and ambient movement, amplified by disinformation and distortion, broadcast in social and right-wing media, aggressively militant, and framed with falsehoods."
- Appel, Edward C. (March 12, 2018). "Burlesque, Tragedy, and a (Potentially) 'Yuuuge' 'Breaking of a Frame': Donald Trump's Rhetoric as 'Early Warning'?". Communication Quarterly. 66 (2): 157–175. doi:10.1080/01463373.2018.1439515. S2CID 149031634.
- Bader, Michael (December 25, 2016). "The Decline of Empathy and the Appeal of Right-Wing Politics – Child psychology can teach us about the current GOP". Psychology Today.
- Baker, Joseph O.; Perry, Samuel L.; Whitehead, Andrew L. (May 14, 2020). "Keep America Christian (and White): Christian Nationalism, Fear of Ethnoracial Outsiders, and Intention to Vote for Donald Trump in the 2020 Presidential Election". Sociology of Religion. 81 (3): 272–293. doi:10.1093/socrel/sraa015. hdl:1805/26339. "In the penultimate year before Trump's reelection campaign, the strongest predictors of supporting Trump, in order of magnitude, were political party, xenophobia, identifying as African American (negative), political ideology, Christian nationalism, and Islamophobia."
- Baltz, Matthew J. (2021). "'Americanism not globalism will be our credo!': An analysis of the economic nationalism(s) of Trump's administration and an agenda for further research". Nations and Nationalism. 27 (3): 797–815. doi:10.1111/nana.12717.
- Berman, Sheri (May 2021). "The Causes of Populism in the West". Annual Review of Political Science. 24: 71–88. doi:10.1146/annurev-polisci-041719-102503. ISSN 1094-2939.
- Bloodworth, Jeffrey (July 4, 2023). "Trumpism's Paleoconservative Roots and Dealignment" (PDF). Journal of Right-Wing Studies. 1 (1). doi:10.5070/RW3.1502. Archived (PDF) from the original on May 8, 2024.
- Blyth, Mark (November 15, 2016). "Global Trumpism: Why Trump's Victory was 30 Years in the Making and Why It Won't Stop Here". Foreign Affairs. Archived from the original on March 4, 2021.
- Boehm, Christopher (February 13, 2016). "Political Animals". New Scientist. 229 (3060): 26–27. Bibcode:2016NewSc.229...26B. doi:10.1016/S0262-4079(16)30320-7.
- Brettschneider, Corey; Calvelli, Aidan G. (July 2024). "The US Presidency: Power and Constraint". Annual Review of Political Science. 27: 205–222. doi:10.1146/annurev-polisci-051120-113134. ISSN 1094-2939.
- Campani, Giovanna; Concepción, Sunamis Fabelo; Soler, Angel Rodriguez; Savín, Claudia Sánchez (November 2, 2022). "The Rise of Donald Trump Right-Wing Populism in the United States: Middle American Radicalism and Anti-Immigration Discourse". Societies. 12 (6): 154. doi:10.3390/soc12060154.
- Choma, Becky L.; Hanoch, Yaniv (February 2017). "Cognitive ability and authoritarianism: Understanding support for Trump and Clinton". Personality and Individual Differences. 106 (1): 287–291. doi:10.1016/j.paid.2016.10.054. hdl:10026.1/8451.
- Cornelis, Ilse; Van Hiel, Alain (2015). "Extreme right-wing voting in Western Europe: The role of social-cultural and antiegalitarian attitudes". Political Psychology. 35 (6): 749–760. doi:10.1111/pops.12187. hdl:1854/LU-01H4EFGEE1S6ZQ7EBMD2PGNBCB. Archived from the original on January 14, 2024.
- Cui, Xi (2018). "Emotional Contagion or Symbolic Cognition? A Social Identity Perspective on Media Events". Journal of Broadcasting & Electronic Media. 62 (1): 91–108. doi:10.1080/08838151.2017.1402906. S2CID 149162170.
- Cox, Lloyd; O'Connor, Brendon (2025). "Trumpism, fascism and neoliberalism". Distinktion: Journal of Social Theory [online]. 27: 29–46. doi:10.1080/1600910X.2025.2481159.
- Darian-Smith, Eve (2023). "Deadly global alliance: antidemocracy and anti-environmentalism". Third World Quarterly. 44 (2): 284–299. doi:10.1080/01436597.2022.2144206.
- Diamond, Michael J. (February 22, 2023). "Perverted Containment: Trumpism, Cult Creation, and the Rise of Destructive American Populism". Psychoanalytic Inquiry. 43 (2). Taylor & Francis: 96–109. doi:10.1080/07351690.2023.2163147. ISSN 0735-1690. Archived from the original on November 6, 2024.
- Droste, Luigi (2021). "Feeling Left Behind by Political Decisionmakers: Anti-Establishment Sentiment in Contemporary Democracies". Politics and Governance. 9 (3): 288–300. doi:10.17645/pag.v9i3.3949.
- Elhefnawy, Nader (February 4, 2025). "Has Centrism Failed? A Note". SSRN. doi:10.2139/ssrn.5124195.
- Fassassi, Idris (2020). "Donald Trump et la Constitution" [Donald Trump and the Constitution]. Pouvoirs (in French). 172 (1): 29–48. doi:10.3917/pouv.172.0029. ISSN 0152-0768.
- Federico, Christopher M.; Golec de Zavala, Agnieszka (March 6, 2018). "Collective Narcissism and the 2016 US Presidential Vote" (PDF). Public Opinion Quarterly. 82 (1). Oxford University Press: 110–121. doi:10.1093/poq/nfx048. Archived from the original on February 14, 2022.
- Feldman, Stanley; Stenner, Karen (June 28, 2008). "Perceived threat and authoritarianism". Political Psychology. 18 (4): 741–770. doi:10.1111/0162-895X.00077.
- Franks, Andrew S.; Hesami, Farhang (September 18, 2021). "Seeking Evidence of The MAGA Cult and Trump Derangement Syndrome: An Examination of (A)symmetric Political Bias". Societies. 11 (3): 113. doi:10.3390/soc11030113. "Trump supporters consistently showed bias in favor of the interests and ostensible positions of Trump, whereas Trump's detractors did not show an opposing bias ... Results of the current study do not support the broad existence of so-called 'Trump Derangement Syndrome' on the left, but they may lend credence to accusations that some Trump supporters have a cult-like loyalty to the 45th president."
- Gabriel, Shira; Paravati, Elaine; Green, Melanie C.; Flomsbee, Jason (2018). "From Apprentice to president: The role of parasocial connection in the election of Donald Trump". Social Psychological and Personality Science. 9 (3): 299–307. doi:10.1177/1948550617722835. S2CID 149911195. Archived from the original on January 15, 2024.
- Giroux, Henry A. (2021). "Trumpism and the challenge of critical education". Educational Philosophy and Theory. 55 (6): 5. doi:10.1080/00131857.2021.1884066. S2CID 234851204. "As the social state came under severe attack, the punishing state grew with its ongoing militarization of civil society and its increasing criminalization of social problems. War, dehumanization, divisiveness, hate, and the language of racial cleansing and sorting became central governing principles and set the stage for the rebirth of an updated fascist politics. Trumpism reached into every niche and crack of civil and political society and in doing so cross-pollinated politics, culture, and everyday life with a range of right-wing policies, authoritarian impulses, and the emerging presence of right-wing movements."
- Goldsmith, Benajmin E.; Moen, Lars J. K. (May 14, 2024). "The personality of a personality cult? Personality characteristics of Donald Trump's most loyal supporters". Political Psychology. 46 (Special Issue): 225–243. doi:10.1111/pops.12991. "We contend that, for his most committed followers, the attraction is personality-based — both in terms of Trump's self-presentation to citizens and in terms of the personality characteristics making some citizens attracted to such leadership. Trump's appeal appears to fit Sundahl's (2023) three characteristics of a personality cult. The phenomenon of a political personality cult may have arrived in full force in U.S. democracy — and could potentially be its undoing."
- Golec de Zavala, Agnieszka; Cichocka, Aleksandra; Eidelson, Roy; Jayawickreme, Nuwan (2009). "Collective Narcissism and Its Social Consequences" (PDF). Journal of Personality and Social Psychology. 97 (6): 1074–1096. doi:10.1037/a0016904. PMID 19968420. Archived from the original (PDF) on March 24, 2018.
- Graves, Frank; Smith, Jeff (June 30, 2020). "Northern Populism: Causes and Consequences of the New Ordered Outlook". School of Public Policy. 13. doi:10.11575/sppp.v13i0.69884. ISSN 2560-8320. Archived from the original on January 17, 2021.
- Gutterman, David (2020). "Book Review: Believe Me: The Evangelical Road to Donald Trump". eJournal of Public Affairs. 9 (2). doi:10.1111/1467-9809.12592. S2CID 199267291.
- Habersack, Fabian; Wegscheider, Carsten (2024). "Left Behind Economically or Politically? Economic Grievances, Representation, and Populist Attitudes". Politics and Governance. 12 8567: 8567 (1–15). doi:10.17645/pag.8567.
- Hahl, Oliver; Kim, Minjae; Zuckerman Sivan, Ezra W. (2018). "The Authentic Appeal of the Lying Demagogue: Proclaiming the Deeper Truth about Political Illegitimacy". American Sociological Review. 83 (1): 1–33. doi:10.1177/0003122417749632. ISSN 0003-1224.
- Hall, Kira; Goldstein, Donna M.; Ingram, Matthew Bruce (2016). "The hands of Donald Trump: Entertainment, gesture, spectacle". HAU: Journal of Ethnographic Theory. 6 (2). doi:10.14318/hau6.2.009. S2CID 55012627.
- Hamilton, Lawrence C. (January 10, 2024). Ettinger, Aaron (ed.). "Trumpism, climate and COVID: Social bases of the new science rejection". PLOS ONE. 19 (1) e0293059. Bibcode:2024PLoSO..1993059H. doi:10.1371/journal.pone.0293059. ISSN 1932-6203. PMC 10781192. PMID 38198461. "Trumpism itself is predicted by age, race, evangelical religion, ideology, and receptivity to seemingly non-political conspiracy beliefs. Considering direct as well as indirect effects (through Trumpism), climate change and vaccine rejection are similarly predicted by white and evangelical identity, conspiracism, and by education×ideology and friends×party interactions."
- Havercroft, Jonathan; Wiener, Antje; Kumm, Mattias; Dunoff, Jeffrey L (March 2018). "Editorial: Donald Trump as global constitutional breaching experiment". Global Constitutionalism. 7 (1): 1–13. doi:10.1017/S2045381718000035. ISSN 2045-3817.
- Hidalgo-Tenorio, Encarnación; Benítez-Castro, Miguel-Ángel (2021). "Trump's populist discourse and affective politics, or on how to move 'the People' through emotion". Globalisation, Societies and Education. 20 (2): 86–109. doi:10.1080/14767724.2020.1861540. hdl:10481/86686. S2CID 234260705.
- Hoad, Neville (November 20, 2020). "Big man sovereignty and sexual politics in pandemic time". Safundi the Journal of SouthAfrican and American Studies. 21 (4): 433–455. doi:10.1080/17533171.2020.1832801. S2CID 228896339.
- Hogg, Michael; van Knippenberg, Daan; Rast, David E. (2012). "The social identity theory of leadership: Theoretical origins, research findings, and conceptual developments". European Review of Social Psychology. 23: 258–304. doi:10.1080/10463283.2012.741134. S2CID 143555737.
- Imhoff, Roland; Lamberty, Pia (2018). "How paranoid are conspiracy believers? Toward a more fine-grained understanding of the connect and disconnect between paranoia and belief in conspiracy theories". European Journal of Social Psychology. 48 (7): 909–926. doi:10.1002/ejsp.2494. S2CID 150284134. Archived from the original on April 14, 2021.
- Isaac, Jeffrey (November 2017). "Making America Great Again?". Perspectives on Politics. 15 (3). Cambridge University Press: 625–631. doi:10.1017/S1537592717000871.
- Jackson, Paul Nicholas (2021). "Debate: Donald Trump and Fascism Studies". Fascism. 10 (1): 1–15. doi:10.1163/22116257-10010009. ISSN 2211-6257.
- Johnson, Jessica (2018). "The Self-Radicalization of White Men". Communication, Culture & Critique. 11 (1). doi:10.1093/ccc/tcx014. Archived from the original on January 15, 2024.
- Jones, Karen (2019). "Trust, distrust, and affective looping". Philosophical Studies. 176 (4). Springer Nature: 955–968. doi:10.1007/s11098-018-1221-5. S2CID 171852867.
  - Partial reprint: Jones, Karen (November 14, 2019). "Understanding the emotions is key to breaking the cycle of distrust". ABC's Religion and Ethics. Australian Broadcasting Corporation. Archived from the original on November 24, 2020.
- Kahan, Dan; Peters, Ellen; Dawson, Erica Cantrell; Slovic, Paul (2017). "Motivated numeracy and enlightened self-government". Behavioural Public Policy. 1 (1). Cambridge University Press: 54–86. doi:10.1017/bpp.2016.2. hdl:1794/18962. S2CID 231735365.
- Kaul, Nitasha (June 17, 2021). "The Misogyny of Authoritarians in Contemporary Democracies" (PDF). International Studies Review. 23 (4): 1619–1645. doi:10.1093/isr/viab028.
- Kimmel, Michael; Wade, Lisa (2018). "Ask a Feminist: Michael Kimmel and Lisa Wade Discuss Toxic Masculinity". Signs: Journal of Women in Culture and Society. 44 (1): 233–254. doi:10.1086/698284. S2CID 149487672.
- Lebow, David (May 13, 2019). "Trumpism and the Dialectic of Neoliberal Reason". Perspectives on Politics. 17 (2). Cambridge University Press: 380–398. doi:10.1017/S1537592719000434. S2CID 182013544.
  - Lee, Bandy X. (November 17, 2023). "Dangerous leadership and a culture of violence: shared psychosis in the age of Donald Trump". Journal of Cultural Psychology. 4. Springer Nature: 109–120. doi:10.1007/s43638-023-00078-y.
- Leone, Luigi; Desimoni, Marta; Chirumbolo, Antonio (September 26, 2012). "Interest and expertise moderate the relationship between right-wing attitudes, ideological self-placement and voting". European Journal of Personality. 28 (1): 2–13. doi:10.1002/per.1880. S2CID 143037865.
- Locatelli, Andrea; Carati, Andrea (2023). "Trump's Legacy and the Liberal International Order: Why Trump Failed to Institutionalise an Anti-global Agenda". Italian Journal of International Affairs. 58 (1): 92–108. doi:10.1080/03932729.2022.2156226.
- Lubbers, Marcel; Scheepers, Peer (December 7, 2010). "French Front National voting: A micro and macro perspective" (PDF). Ethnic and Racial Studies. 25 (1): 120–149. doi:10.1080/01419870120112085. hdl:11370/a3226cec-30ee-4c69-bd24-ba49cbbb17cf. S2CID 59362467. Archived (PDF) from the original on February 15, 2021.
- Maher, Henry (2023). "Neoliberal fascism? Fascist trends in early neoliberal thought and echoes in the present". Contemporary Political Theory. 23 (3): 392–410. doi:10.1057/s41296-023-00657-x. ISSN 1470-8914.
- Marietta, Morgan; Farley, Tyler; Cote, Tyler; Murphy, Paul (2017). "The Rhetorical Psychology of Trumpism". The Forum. 15 (2). De Gruyter: 313–312. doi:10.1515/for-2017-0019. S2CID 148986197.
- Mason, Liliana; Wronski, Julie; Kane, John V. (2021). "Activating Animus: The Uniquely Social Roots of Trump Support". American Political Science Review. 115 (4). Cambridge University Press: 1508–1516. doi:10.1017/S0003055421000563. S2CID 237860170. "Trump's support is thus uniquely tied to animus toward minority groups. Our findings provide insights into the social divisions underlying American politics and the role of elite rhetoric in translating animus into political support."
- McGaughey, Ewan (2018). "Fascism-Lite in America (or the Social Ideal of Donald Trump)". British Journal of American Legal Studies. 7 (2): 291–315. doi:10.2478/bjals-2018-0012. S2CID 195842347. SSRN 2773217.
- Morris, Edwin Kent (2019). "Inversion, Paradox, and Liberal Disintegration: Towards a Conceptual Framework of Trumpism". New Political Science. 41 (1): 17–35. doi:10.1080/07393148.2018.1558037. S2CID 149978398. "Trumpian fascism is a different kind of fascism. It is better understood as an inverted, American kind of fascism, distinct from European fascism, but not entirely dissimilar from it. Inverted American-style fascism differs from European fascist in one crucial way: the role of corporate power in the politics of the state."
- Mutz, Diana C. (2018). "Status threat, not economic hardship, explains the 2016 presidential vote". PNAS. 115 (19): E4330–E4339. Bibcode:2018PNAS..115E4330M. doi:10.1073/pnas.1718155115. PMC 5948965. PMID 29686081.
- Ott, Brian L. (2017). "The age of Twitter: Donald J. Trump and the politics of debasement". Critical Studies in Media Communication. 34 (1): 59–68. doi:10.1080/15295036.2016.1266686. S2CID 152133074.
- Pape, Robert A. (April 6, 2021). "Understanding American Domestic Terrorism-Mobilization Potential and Risk Factors of a New Threat Trajectory" (PDF). Chicago Project on Security and Threats. University of Chicago. Archived (PDF) from the original on April 17, 2021.
- Paravati, Elaine; Naidu, Esha; Gabriel, Shira; Wiedemann, Carl (December 23, 2019). "More than just a tweet: The unconscious impact of forming parasocial relationships through social media". Psychology of Consciousness: Theory, Research, and Practice. 7 (4): 388–403. doi:10.1037/cns0000214. S2CID 212834936.
- Pettigrew, Thomas F. (March 2, 2017). "Social Psychological Perspectives on Trump Supporters". Journal of Social and Political Psychology. 5 (1): 107–116. doi:10.5964/jspp.v5i1.750. S2CID 56388590.
- Pulido, Lauro; Bruno, Tianna; Faiver-Serna, Cristina; Galentine, Cassandra (2019). "Environmental Deregulation, Spectacular Racism, and White Nationalism in the Trump Era". Annals of the American Association of Geographers. 109 (2): 520–532. Bibcode:2019AAAG..109..520P. doi:10.1080/24694452.2018.1549473. S2CID 159402163.
- Reicher, Stephen; Haslam, S. Alexander (November 19, 2016). "The politics of hope: Donald Trump as an entrepreneur of identity". Scientific American. Archived from the original on February 15, 2021.
- Reyes, Antonio (May 4, 2020). "I, Trump The cult of personality, anti-intellectualism and the Post-Truth era". Journal of Language and Politics. 19 (6): 869–892. doi:10.1075/jlp.20002.rey. ISSN 1569-2159. Archived from the original on March 5, 2024.
- Reicher, Stephen (May 4, 2017). "La beauté est dans la rue: Four reasons (or perhaps five) to study crowds". Group and Intergroup Relations. 20 (5): 593–605. doi:10.1177/1368430217712835. S2CID 148743518.
- Richardson, Michael (2017). "The Disgust of Donald Trump". Continuum: Journal of Media and Cultural Studies. 31 (6): 747–756. doi:10.1080/10304312.2017.1370077. hdl:1959.4/unsworks_56318. S2CID 148803267.
- Ross, Bertrall L. (October 2024). "Polarization, Populism, and the Crisis of American Democracy". Annual Review of Law and Social Science. 20: 293–308. doi:10.1146/annurev-lawsocsci-041922-035113. ISSN 1550-3631.
- Rubin, April (October 11, 2024). "Trump's top general calls former president 'fascist' and 'dangerous' threat". Axios. Archived from the original on November 9, 2024.
- Schäfer, Armin (2021). "Cultural Backlash? How (Not) to Explain the Rise of Authoritarian Populism". British Journal of Political Science. 54 (4): 1–17.
- Schneiker, Andrea (2018). "Telling the Story of the Superhero and the Anti-Politician as President: Donald Trump's Branding on Twitter". Political Studies Association. 1 (14): 210–223. doi:10.1177/1478929918807712. S2CID 150145298.
- Smith, Julianne; Townsend, Jim (July 9, 2018). "NATO in the Age of Trump:What it Can't and Can't Accomplish Absent U.S. Leadership". Foreign Affairs. Archived from the original on February 15, 2021.
- Sobieraj, Sarah; Berry, Jeffrey M. (2011). "From Incivility to Outrage: Political Discourse in Blogs, Talk Radio, and Cable News". Political Communication. 28 (1): 19–41. doi:10.1080/10584609.2010.542360. S2CID 143739086.
- Steiner, Nils D.; Schimpf, Christian H.; Wuttke, Alexander (2023). "Left Behind and United by Populism? Populism's Multiple Roots in Feelings of Lacking Societal Recognition". Polit Vierteljahresschr. 64: 107–132. doi:10.1007/s11615-022-00416-4.
- Stephens-Dougan, LaFluer (May 2021). "The Persistence of Racial Cues and Appeals in American Elections". Annual Review of Political Science. 24: 301–320. doi:10.1146/annurev-polisci-082619-015522. ISSN 1094-2939.
- Stoller, Paul (April 27, 2017). "More on the Anthropology of Trump". Anthropology Now. 9 (1): 58–60. doi:10.1080/19428200.2017.1291135. S2CID 149440462. Archived from the original on February 15, 2021.
- Strauss, Peter L. (2019). "The Trump administration and the rule of law". Revue française d'administration publique. 170 (170): 433–446. doi:10.3917/rfap.170.0433.
- Suessenbach, Felix; Moore, Adam B. (2020). "Dominance desires predicting conspiracy beliefs and Trump support in the 2016 U.S. Election" (PDF). Motivation Science. 6 (2): 171–176. doi:10.1037/mot0000146. hdl:20.500.11820/044b23e6-d62f-471c-8be4-4ad69e28a14e. S2CID 189448130.
- Sundahl, Anne-Mette Holmgård (May 4, 2022). "Personality Cult or a Mere Matter of Popularity?". International Journal of Politics, Culture, and Society. 36 (4): 431–458. doi:10.1007/s10767-022-09423-0. PMC 9066393. PMID 35528318. "Trump, Putin and Ardern are used as examples of the model's ability to distinguish between cult and non-cult phenomena. The comparison shows that only Trump and Putin have a cult on both dimensions ... This paper introduced a model for distinguishing between popularity and personality cults based on three parameters covering a representational and social practice dimension. Putin, Trump and Ardern were used to illustrate the model's ability to categorise phenomena with different degrees of charisma. The analysis shows that while Trump and Putin belong in the domain of personality cults, Ardern's alleged cult does not have a social practice dimension, as the few cultlike tendencies are strictly representational."
- Swyngedouw, Marc; Ivaldi, Giles (December 2007). "The extreme right utopia in Belgium and France: The ideology of the Flemish Vlaams Blok and the French front national". West European Politics. 24 (3): 1–22. doi:10.1080/01402380108425450. S2CID 144383766.
- Theidon, Kimberly (November 11, 2020). "A forecasted failure: Intersectionality, COVID-19, and the perfect storm". Journal of Human Rights. 95 (5): 528–536. doi:10.1080/14754835.2020.1822156. S2CID 226308311.
- Thompson, Jack (June 12, 2017). "Understanding Trumpism: The foreign policy of the new American president" (PDF). Sirius: Journal of Strategic Analysis. 1 (2). De Gruyter: 109–115. doi:10.1515/sirius-2017-0052. S2CID 157683957. Archived (PDF) from the original on February 15, 2021.
- Tollefson, Jeff (February 4, 2021). "Tracking QAnon: how Trump turned conspiracy-theory research upside down" (PDF). Nature. 590 (7845). Nature Research: 192–193. Bibcode:2021Natur.590..192T. doi:10.1038/d41586-021-00257-y. ISSN 1476-4687. LCCN 12037118. PMID 33542489. S2CID 231818589. Archived (PDF) from the original on April 27, 2021.
- Tourish, Dennis (2024). "It is time to use the F word about Trump: Fascism, populism and the rebirth of history". Leadership. 20 (1): 9–32. doi:10.1177/17427150231210732. ISSN 1742-7150.
- Urbinati, Nadia (May 2019). "Political Theory of Populism". Annual Review of Political Science. 22: 111–127. doi:10.1146/annurev-polisci-050317-070753. ISSN 1094-2939.
- Urbinati, Nadia (May 26, 2020). "On Trumpism, or the End of American Exceptionalism". Teoria Politica, Nuova Serie Annali. 9: 209–226. Archived from the original on January 31, 2021.
- Van Assche, Jasper; Dhont, Kristof; Pettigrew, Thomas F. (April 2019). "The social-psychological bases of far-right support in Europe and the United States". Journal of Community & Applied Social Psychology. 29 (5): 385–401. doi:10.1002/casp.2407. hdl:1854/LU-8639899. S2CID 155558324. Archived from the original on May 23, 2022 – via ResearchGate.
- Van Hiel, Alain (March 2012). "A psycho-political profile of party activists and left-wing and right-wing extremists". European Journal of Political Research. 51 (2): 166–203. doi:10.1111/j.1475-6765.2011.01991.x. hdl:1854/LU-2109499. Archived from the original on February 15, 2021.
- Van Hiel, Alain; Mervielde, Ivan (July 2006). "Explaining conservative beliefs and political preferences: A comparison of social dominance orientation and authoritarianism". Journal of Applied Social Psychology. 32 (5): 965–976. doi:10.1111/j.1559-1816.2002.tb00250.x.
- Vescio, Theresa K.; Schermerhorn, Nathaniel E. (2021). "Hegemonic masculinity predicts 2016 and 2020 voting and candidate evaluations". Proceedings of the National Academy of Sciences. 118 (2) e2020589118. Bibcode:2021PNAS..11820589V. doi:10.1073/pnas.2020589118. PMC 7812802. PMID 33397724.
- Whitehead, Andrew L.; Perry, Samuel L.; Baker, Joseph O. (January 25, 2018). "Make America Christian Again: Christian Nationalism and Voting for Donald Trump in the 2016 Presidential Election" (PDF). Sociology of Religion. 79 (2): 147–171. doi:10.1093/socrel/srx070. "Why did Americans vote for Donald Trump in the 2016 Presidential election? Social scientists have proposed a variety of explanations, including economic dissatisfaction, sexism, racism, Islamophobia, and xenophobia. The current study establishes that, independent of these influences, voting for Trump was, at least for many Americans, a symbolic defense of the United States' perceived Christian heritage. Data from a national probability sample of Americans surveyed soon after the 2016 election shows that greater adherence to Christian nationalist ideology was a robust predictor of voting for Trump, even after controlling for economic dissatisfaction, sexism, anti-black prejudice, anti-Muslim refugee attitudes, and anti-immigrant sentiment, as well as measures of religion, sociodemographics, and political identity more generally."
- Womick, Jake; Rothmund, Tobias; Azevedo, Flavio; King, Laura A.; Jost, John T. (June 20, 2018). "Group-Based Dominance and Authoritarian Aggression Predict Support for Donald Trump in the 2016 U.S. Presidential Election" (PDF). Social Psychological and Personality Science. 10 (5): 643–652. doi:10.1177/1948550618778290. S2CID 55503314. Archived (PDF) from the original on December 24, 2021.
- Wood, Matthew; Antova, Ivanka; Flear, Mark; Hervey, Tamara (2023). "What Do "Left Behind Communities" Want? A Qualitative Study in the United Kingdom using Photo Elicitation". American Political Science Review. 117 (4): 1173–1187. doi:10.1017/S0003055422001186.
- Wuttke, Alexander; Floos, Florian (2025). "Making the case for democracy: A field-experiment on democratic persuasion". European Journal of Political Research. 64 (2): 559–579. doi:10.1111/1475-6765.12705.
- Yang, Mimi (September 25, 2018). "Trumpism: a disfigured Americanism". Palgrave Communications. 4 117: 1–13. doi:10.1057/s41599-018-0170-0. "Trump's "America First" is not exactly original but from a culturally genetic and historic make-up that builds the vertical America. The xenophobic and anti-immigration rhetoric has its origin in nativism that harbors white nationalism, populism, protectionism and isolationism ... Trumpism is not Americanism, but a masqueraded white supremacism and nativism; it is a disfigured Americanism in its vertical form."

=== News articles ===
- Adebayo, Bukola (January 9, 2020). "A majority of Nigerians and Kenyans have confidence in President Trump, according to Pew research". CNN. Archived from the original on August 29, 2022.
- Akinwotu, Emmanuel (October 31, 2020). "'He just says it as it is': why many Nigerians support Donald Trump". The Guardian. Archived from the original on July 21, 2022.
- Alter, Ethan (January 14, 2021). "'The Punisher' star Jon Bernthal lashes out at 'misguided and lost' Capitol rioters for appropriating Marvel hero's famous skull symbol". Yahoo Entertainment. Archived from the original on February 9, 2021.
- Andersen, Travis (January 6, 2021). "Before mob stormed US Capitol, Trump told them to 'fight like hell'". The Boston Globe. Archived from the original on January 7, 2021.
- Applebaum, Anne (October 18, 2024). "Trump Is Speaking Like Hitler, Stalin, and Mussolini". The Atlantic. Archived from the original on October 24, 2024.
- Arnsdorf, Isaac; Dawsey, Josh; Barrett, Devlin (November 5, 2023). "Trump and allies plot revenge, Justice Department control in a second term". The Washington Post. Archived from the original on November 5, 2023.
- Assheuer, Thomas (May 16, 2018). "Donald Trump: Das Recht bin ich". Die Zeit (in German). Archived from the original on January 26, 2021.
- Bailey, Sarah Pulliam (November 28, 2017). "Acts of Faith. A Trump-like politician in Brazil could snag the support of a powerful religious group: evangelicals". The Washington Post. Archived from the original on February 18, 2018.
- Baker, Peter (June 10, 2022). "Trump Is Depicted as a Would-Be Autocrat Seeking to Hang Onto Power at All Costs". The New York Times. ISSN 0362-4331. Archived from the original on June 10, 2022.
- Baker, Peter (December 9, 2023). "Talk of a Trump Dictatorship Charges the American Political Debate". The New York Times. ISSN 0362-4331. Archived from the original on December 9, 2023.
- Baker, Peter (February 11, 2024). "Favoring Foes Over Friends, Trump Threatens to Upend International Order". The New York Times. ISSN 1553-8095. Archived from the original on February 20, 2024.
- Balk, Tim (October 25, 2024). "13 Ex-Trump Aides Back Kelly's 'Dictator' Warning, Saying Trump Seeks 'Absolute, Unchecked Power'". The New York Times. ISSN 0362-4331. Archived from the original on November 2, 2024.
- Bankole, Idowu (February 3, 2020). "Trump's rally: IPOB commends US over Kanu's VIP invitation". Vanguard News. Archived from the original on July 22, 2022.
- Barrett, David; Zapotosky, Matt (January 13, 2021). "FBI report warned of 'war' at Capitol, contradicting claims there was no indication of looming violence". The Washington Post. Archived from the original on April 15, 2021.
- Basu, Zachary (November 13, 2023). "Trump campaign defends "vermin" speech amid fascist comparisons". Axios. Archived from the original on December 9, 2023.
- Beauchamp, Zack (July 17, 2019). "Trump and the dead end of conservative nationalism". Vox. Archived from the original on January 9, 2024.
- Bebout, Lee (January 7, 2021). "Trump tapped into white victimhood – leaving fertile ground for white supremacists". The Conversation. Archived from the original on January 10, 2021. "Trumpism tapped into a long-standing sense of aggrievement that often—but not exclusively—manifests as white victimhood."
- Beer, Tommy (January 16, 2021). "Fox News Viewership Plummets: First Time Behind CNN And MSNBC In Two Decades". Forbes. Archived from the original on April 9, 2021.
- Beinart, Peter (January 2019). "The New Authoritarians Are Waging War on Women". The Atlantic. Archived from the original on January 27, 2024.
- Bender, Michael C.; Gold, Michael (November 14, 2023). "When Trump tells you he's an authoritarian, believe him". Vox. Archived from the original on December 8, 2023.
- Bender, Michael C.; Gold, Michael (November 20, 2023). "Trump's Dire Words Raise New Fears About His Authoritarian Bent". The New York Times. ISSN 0362-4331. Archived from the original on December 8, 2023.
- Bender, Michael C. (April 1, 2024). "The Church of Trump: How He's Infusing Christianity Into His Movement". The New York Times. ISSN 0362-4331. Archived from the original on April 2, 2024.
- Benjamin, Rich (September 28, 2020). "Democrats Need to Wake Up: The Trump Movement Is Shot Through With Fascism". The Intercept. Archived from the original on January 31, 2021.
- Ben-Ghiat, Ruth (December 9, 2020). "Op-Ed: Trump's formula for building a lasting personality cult". Los Angeles Times. Archived from the original on October 19, 2023.
- Lempinen, Edward (December 7, 2020). "Despite drift toward authoritarianism, Trump voters stay loyal. Why?". University of California, Berkeley News. Archived from the original on January 5, 2024.
- Bidgood, Jess; Ulloa, Jazmine (October 1, 2020). "A debate and a rally show Trump's closing strategy: Tapping into the white grievance of his political bubble". The Boston Globe. Duluth, Minneapolis. Archived from the original on January 22, 2021.
- Blair, Leonardo (December 15, 2020). "Beth Moore draws flak and praise after warning Christians against 'dangerous' Trumpism". Christian Post. Archived from the original on December 15, 2020.
- Blake, Aaron (January 7, 2021). "'Let's have trial by combat': How Trump and allies egged on the violent scenes Wednesday". The Washington Post. ISSN 0190-8286. Archived from the original on January 7, 2021.
- Bleiberg, Joshua; West, Darrell M. (May 13, 2015). "Political Polarization on Facebook". The Brookings Institution. Archived from the original on October 10, 2017.
- Bond, Paul (February 29, 2016). "Leslie Moonves on Donald Trump: "It May Not Be Good for America, but It's Damn Good for CBS"". The Hollywood Reporter. Archived from the original on February 9, 2021.
- Bote, Joshua (October 22, 2020). "Half of Trump supporters believe in QAnon conspiracy theory's baseless claims, poll finds". USA Today. Archived from the original on January 15, 2021.
- Brant, Danielle (October 4, 2018). "Bolsonaro Uses Same Fascist Tactics As Trump, Says Yale Professor". Folha de São Paulo. São Paulo. Archived from the original on March 27, 2019.
- Brazile, Donna (August 28, 2020). "Convention shows Republican Party has died and been replaced by Trump Party". Fox News (Opinion). Archived from the original on August 31, 2020.
- Breslin, Maureen (November 8, 2021). "Former aide: Trump would 'absolutely' impose some form of autocracy in second term". The Hill. Archived from the original on September 25, 2023.
- Brewster, Jack (November 22, 2020). "Republicans Ask, Whether Or Not Trump Runs In 2024, What Will Come Of Trumpism?". Forbes. Archived from the original on January 10, 2021.
- Husser, Jason (April 6, 2020). "Why Trump is reliant on white evangelicals". The Brookings Institution. Archived from the original on March 2, 2021.
- Brooks, David (November 26, 2020). "The rotting of the Republican mind". The New York Times (Opinion). Archived from the original on December 5, 2020.
- Brooks, Emily (October 25, 2024). "Johnson and McConnell: Harris calling Trump 'fascist' could invite assassination attempt". The Hill. Archived from the original on November 9, 2024.
- Browning, Christopher R. (October 25, 2018). "The Suffocation of Democracy". The New York Review. Vol. 65, no. 16. Archived from the original on June 9, 2020. "Trump is not Hitler and Trumpism is not Nazism, but regardless of how the Trump presidency concludes, this is a story unlikely to have a happy ending."
- Browning, Christopher R. (July 25, 2023). "A New Kind of Fascism". The Atlantic. Washington, D.C.: Laurene Powell Jobs. Archived from the original on September 26, 2024.
- Bump, Philip (October 20, 2020). "Even if they haven't heard of QAnon, most Trump voters believe its wild allegations". The Washington Post. Archived from the original on December 13, 2020.
- Butler, Judith; Salmon, Christian (December 29, 2016). "Trump, fascism, and the construction of "the people": An interview with Judith Butler". VersoBooks. Translated by Broder, David. Verso. Archived from the original on May 14, 2021.
  - The Verso published English translation is of the article: Butler, Judith; Salmon, Christian (December 18, 2016). "Judith Butler: pourquoi "Trump est un phénomène fasciste"" [Judith Butler: Why "Trump is a fascist phenomenon"]. Mediapart (in French). Archived from the original on May 18, 2021.
- Campbell, John (February 11, 2020). "Despite Travel Ban, Trump Remains Popular in Nigeria". Council on Foreign Relations. Archived from the original on August 29, 2022.
- Campbell, Clark (September 16, 2022). "The making of Pierre Poilievre, conservative proselytizer". The Globe and Mail.
- Cash, John (2017). Fitzroy, Vic (ed.). "Trumped in the Looking-glass" (pdf). Arena Magazine. No. 151. Archived from the original on May 24, 2021.
- Cassidy, John (November 14, 2023). "Trump's Fascistic Rhetoric Only Emphasizes the Stakes in 2024". The New Yorker. New York City: Condé Nast. Archived from the original on October 9, 2024.
- "Andrew Scheer praises Erin O'Toole as next leader of Conservative Party". CBC. August 24, 2020. Archived from the original on January 18, 2021.
- Erin O'Toole (newly-elected leader of the CPC) (September 8, 2020). O'Toole on his 'Canada First' policy. Power & Politics. Archived from the original on January 16, 2021.
- Rahn, Will; Patterson, Dan (September 29, 2020). "What is the QAnon conspiracy theory?". CBS News. Archived from the original on October 2, 2020.
- Cegielski, Stephanie (March 29, 2016). "An Open Letter to Trump Voters from His Top Strategist-Turned-Defector". xoJane. Archived from the original on August 25, 2018.
- Chomsky, Noam; Polychroniou, Chronis J. (November 26, 2020). "Noam Chomsky: Trump Has Revealed the Extreme Fragility of American Democracy". Global Policy. Wiley-Blackwell. Archived from the original on May 18, 2021.
- Chotiner, Isaac (July 29, 2021). "Redefining Populism". The New Yorker.
- Cillizza, Chris (February 4, 2021). "Three-quarters of Republicans believe a lie about the 2020 election". CNN. Archived from the original on February 7, 2021.
- Clavey, Charles H. (October 20, 2020). "Donald Trump, Our Prophet of Deceit". Boston Review. Archived from the original on October 21, 2020.
- Clemens, Colleen (December 11, 2017). "What We Mean When We Say 'Toxic Masculinity.'". Learning for Justice. Southern Poverty Law Center. Archived from the original on April 18, 2021.
- Cockburn, Patrick (November 4, 2020). "Trump's bid to stop the count risks turning America into an 'illiberal democracy' like Turkey". The Independent (U.K.). Archived from the original on June 25, 2021.
- Confessore, Nicholas; Yourish, Karen (March 25, 2016). "$2 Billion Worth of Free Media for Donald Trump". The New York Times. Archived from the original on January 27, 2021.
- Colvin, Geoff (August 25, 2020). "The Republican Party turns its platform into a person: Donald Trump". Fortune. Archived from the original on September 14, 2021.
- Colvin, Jill; Barrow, Bill (December 8, 2023). "Trump's vow to only be a dictator on 'day one' follows growing worry over his authoritarian rhetoric". AP News. Archived from the original on December 8, 2023.
- Conroy, J Oliver (February 7, 2017). "'Angry white men': the sociologist who studied Trump's base before Trump". The Guardian. Archived from the original on January 31, 2021.
- Continetti, Matthew (December 22, 2020). "Is Trump Really All That Holds the G.O.P. Together?". The New York Times (Opinion). Archived from the original on January 1, 2021.
- Coronel, Sheila S. (November 9, 2020). "A warning from the Philippines on how a demagogue can haunt politics for decades". The Washington Post (Opinion). Archived from the original on June 29, 2022.
- Cox, Ana Marie (October 12, 2016). "Russell Moore Can't Support Either Candidate". The New York Times. New York. Archived from the original on April 18, 2021.
- da Silva, Chantal (November 6, 2020). "'Reckless' and 'stupid': Trump Jr calls for 'total war' over election results". The Independent. Archived from the original on January 14, 2021.
- Danner, Mark (May 26, 2016). "The Magic of Donald Trump" (PDF). The New York Review of Books. Archived (PDF) from the original on September 20, 2020.
- de Berg, Henk (2024). "Fives Rules for Understanding Trump's Rhetorical Strategy".
- Darby, David (February 15, 2024). "The Constitution versus Donald J. Trump • Daily Montanan". Daily Montanan.
- Delacourt, Susan (November 8, 2020). "Donald Trump lost, but Trumpism is still thriving. Could it take hold in Canada, too?". Toronto Star (Opinion). Archived from the original on January 14, 2021.
- Denby, David (December 15, 2015). "The Plot Against America: Donald Trump's Rhetoric". The New Yorker. Archived from the original on November 8, 2020.
- Devore, Molly (April 3, 2019). "'Trumpism' is not enough of a mass movement to be fascism, visiting professor says". The Badger Herald. Archived from the original on August 14, 2021.
- Dreher, Rod (December 17, 2020). "Church Of Trumpianity". The American Conservative. Washington, D.C. Archived from the original on March 4, 2021.
- Diamond, Jeremy (July 29, 2016). "Timeline: Donald Trump's praise for Vladimir Putin". CNN. Archived from the original on August 9, 2020.
- Donolo, Peter (August 21, 2020). "Trumpism won't happen in Canada – but not because of our politics". The Globe and Mail (Opinion). Archived from the original on January 7, 2021.
- Donolo, Peter (January 9, 2021). "What will become of Trump's Canadian fan base?". Toronto Star (Opinion). Toronto. Archived from the original on January 11, 2021.
- Drutman, Lee (June 8, 2021). "The Republican party is now an explicitly illiberal party". The Guardian. Archived from the original on June 30, 2021.
- Enjeti, Saagar (March 3, 2021). "Trump defines Trumpism". Rising. The Hill. Archived from the original on March 9, 2021.
- Evans, Richard J. (January 13, 2021). "Why Trump isn't a fascist – The storming of the Capitol on 6 January was not a coup. But American democracy is still in danger". New Statesman. Archived from the original on March 12, 2021.
- Fallows, James (October 10, 2016). "Trump Time Capsule #137: Primate Dominance Moves at the Debate". The Atlantic. Archived from the original on February 19, 2021.
- Fawcett, Max (January 12, 2021). "Rigged Canadian election? Why Canada's Conservatives can't seem to quit Donald Trump". National Observer (Opinion). Archived from the original on January 12, 2021.
- Finn, Ed (May 13, 2017). "Is Trump a fascist?". The Independent. Newfoundland. Archived from the original on June 4, 2020.
- Fisher, Marc (May 16, 2019). "After a two-decade friendship and waves of lavish praise, Trump pardons newspaper magnate Conrad Black". The Washington Post. ISSN 0190-8286. Archived from the original on January 16, 2021.
- Forrest, Maura (September 12, 2022). "The quick take on Canada's new Conservative leader". Politico.
- Foster, John Bellamy (June 1, 2017). "This Is Not Populism". Monthly Review (Editorial). Archived from the original on July 1, 2017. "Commenting on the hegemonic framing of the radical right as populist, and the analytical problems that it presents, Andrea Mammone observes in his Transnational Neofascism in France and Italy that "the terms populism and national populism" were deliberately introduced in recent decades by liberal European commentators in order to "replace fascism/neofascism as the used terminology." This move was designed to "provide a sort of political and democratic legitimization of right-wing extremism.""
- Fournier, Philippe J. (October 1, 2020). "How much do Canadians dislike Donald Trump? A lot". Maclean's. Archived from the original on January 11, 2021.
- Fournier, Philippe J. (January 10, 2021). "Canada is not immune to Trumpism". Maclean's. Archived from the original on January 12, 2021.
- Gabler, Neal (April 29, 2016). "Donald Trump, the Emperor of Social Media". Moyers On Democracy. Schumann Media Center. Archived from the original on March 2, 2021.
- Galli, Mark (December 19, 2019). "Trump Should Be Removed from Office". Christianity Today (Editorial). Archived from the original on December 23, 2019.
- Garcia-Navarro, Lulu (January 21, 2024). "Inside the Heritage Foundation's Plans for 'Institutionalizing Trumpism'". The New York Times Magazine. New York City: The New York Times Company. ISSN 0028-7822. Archived from the original on February 13, 2024.
- Gessen, Masha (June 27, 2020). "Since day one, Donald Trump has been an autocrat in the making". The Observer. ISSN 0029-7712. Archived from the original on September 25, 2023.
- Giroux, Henry A. (December 14, 2017). "Fascism's return and Trump's war on youth". The Conversation. Archived from the original on April 16, 2021.
- Glasser, Susan (January 22, 2018). "The Man Who Put Andrew Jackson in Trump's Oval Office". Politico. Archived from the original on November 22, 2020.
- "Trumpism in Canada". Global News. Archived from the original on January 13, 2021.
- Goldberg, Jonah (August 16, 2016). "'New nationalism' amounts to generic white identity politics". Newsday. Archived from the original on November 26, 2016.
- Goldberg, Michelle (December 15, 2020). "Just how dangerous was Trump?". The New York Times (Opinion). Archived from the original on December 16, 2020.
  - An earlier version appeared in peer-reviewed journal Boundary 2: Gordon, Peter E. (June 15, 2016). "Authoritarianism: Three Inquiries in Critical Theory". Boundary 2. Archived from the original on December 8, 2020.
- Gottfried, Jeffrey; Shearer, Elisa (May 26, 2016). "News use across social media platforms 2016". Pew Research Center. Archived from the original on April 14, 2021.
- Green, Emma (January 8, 2021). "A Christian Insurrection". The Atlantic. Archived from the original on January 25, 2021.
- Greenberg, David (December 11, 2016). "An Intellectual History of Trumpism". Politico. Archived from the original on November 15, 2020.
- Gryboski, Michael (November 8, 2012). "Texas Megachurch Pastor Says Obama Will 'Pave Way' for Antichrist". The Christian Post. Archived from the original on February 14, 2022.
- Guilford, Gwynn (April 1, 2016). "Inside the Trump machine: The bizarre psychology of America's newest political movement". Quartz. Archived from the original on February 15, 2021.
- Gumbel, Andrew (January 11, 2025). "'There are a lot of bitter people here, I'm one of them': rust belt voters on why they backed Trump again despite his broken promises". The Guardian.
- Haberman, Maggie (January 6, 2021). "Trump Told Crowd 'You Will Never Take Back Our Country With Weakness'". The New York Times. Archived from the original on January 9, 2021.
- Haltiwanger, John (October 9, 2018). "The 'Brazilian Donald Trump,' Jair Bolsonaro, is visiting the White House. He was elected president despite saying he couldn't love a gay son and that a colleague was too 'ugly' to be raped". Business Insider. Archived from the original on December 10, 2020.
- Haltiwanger, John (March 4, 2021). "Republicans have built a cult of personality around Trump that glosses over his disgraced presidency". Business Insider. Archived from the original on January 15, 2022.
- Harwood, John (January 20, 2017). "Why Trumpism May Not Endure". The New York Times (Opinion). Archived from the original on November 16, 2020.
- Hasan, Mehdi (June 4, 2020). "Is This Trump's Reichstag Fire Moment?". The Intercept. Archived from the original on February 2, 2021.
- Hedges, Chris (January 3, 2020). "Onward, Christian fascists". Salon.com. Archived from the original on December 28, 2020.
- "Trumpism comes to Finland, exporting happiness, and Kardashians in Lapland – Finland in the World Press". Helsinki Times. April 13, 2019. Archived from the original on January 24, 2021.
- Henderson, Bruce (August 24, 2017). "Evangelical Leader Stays on Trump Advisory Council Despite Charlottesville Response". The Charlotte Observer. Archived from the original on February 15, 2021.
- Henninger, Daniel (March 3, 2021). "Trumpism According to Trump". The Wall Street Journal. Archived from the original on March 14, 2021.
- Hilditch, Cameron (December 18, 2020). "Christianity as Ideology: The Cautionary Tale of the Jericho March". National Review. Archived from the original on December 20, 2020.
- Homans, Charles (April 27, 2024). "Donald Trump Has Never Sounded Like This". New York Magazine. Archived from the original on July 19, 2024.
- Horton, Michael (December 16, 2020). "The Cult of Christian Trumpism". The Gospel Coalition. Archived from the original on February 15, 2021.
- Hovland, Ben (September 13, 2020). "Capitol rally targets Minnesota's COVID-19 state of emergency". Albert Lea Tribune and Minnesota Public Radio. Archived from the original on December 24, 2021.
- Hymes, Clare; McDonald, Cassidy; Watson, Elanor (April 16, 2021). "What we know about the "unprecedented" U.S. Capitol riot arrests". CBS News. Archived from the original on April 17, 2021.
- Ibish, Hussain (April 12, 2020). "Is Donald Trump's US sliding towards illiberal democracy?". The National (Abu Dhabi) (Opinion). Archived from the original on June 29, 2021.
- Ilyushina, Mary (December 15, 2020). "Putin, Bolsonaro and AMLO finally congratulate Biden on US election victory". CNN. Archived from the original on January 24, 2021.
- Jacobs, Thomas (October 21, 2016). "Masculinity in the Time of Trump". Pacific Standard. Grist Magazine, Inc. Archived from the original on February 14, 2022.
- Jeffress, Robert; Fea, John (May 26, 2016). "The Evangelical Debate Over Trump" (audio). Interfaith Voices. Archived from the original on December 24, 2021.
- Jeffress, Robert; Wehner, Peter (July 12, 2016). "Dr. Robert Jeffress and Peter Wehner Join Mike for Important Debate over Evangelical Christian Support of Trump" (audio). The Mike Gallagher Show. Archived from the original on February 15, 2021.
- Jindal, Bobby; Castellanos, Alex (January 3, 2021). "Separating Trump from Trumpism is key to the GOP's future". Newsweek (Opinion). Archived from the original on April 16, 2021.
- Johnston, Rich (July 3, 2020). "Why Did Sean Hannity Lose His Punisher Skull Pin On Fox News?". Bleeding Cool. Archived from the original on February 15, 2021.
- Kagan, Robert (May 16, 2016). "This is how fascism comes to America". The Washington Post (Opinion). Archived from the original on February 13, 2021.
- Kakissis, Joanna (May 13, 2019). "In Trump, Hungary's Viktor Orban Has A Rare Ally In The Oval Office". NPR. Archived from the original on February 15, 2021.
- Katzenstein, Peter J. (March 20, 2019). "Trumpism is Us". WZB Mitteilungen. Berlin: Social Science Research Center. Archived from the original on February 15, 2021.
- Kessler, Glenn; Kelly, Meg (January 10, 2018). "President Trump has made more than 2,000 false or misleading claims over 355 days". The Washington Post. Archived from the original on February 15, 2021.
- Kim, Soo Rin; Ibssa, Lalee (November 13, 2023). "Trump compares political opponents to 'vermin' who he will 'root out,' alarming historians". ABC News. Archived from the original on December 8, 2023.
- Kruse, Michael (October 13, 2017). "The Power of Trump's Positive Thinking". Politico. Archived from the original on February 15, 2021.
- Kuhn, Johannes (September 2, 2017). "Who moved America to the right". Süddeutsche Zeitung. Archived from the original on February 15, 2021.
- Kuhn, Johannes (July 17, 2018). "Trump und Putin: Republikaner üben leichte Kritik". Süddeutsche Zeitung (in German). Archived from the original on February 15, 2021.
- Lange, Jason (January 17, 2024). "Trump's rise sparks isolationist worries abroad, but voters unfazed". Reuters.
- Lehmann, Chris (November 14, 2023). "The "Is Donald Trump a Fascist?" Debate Has Been Ended—by Donald Trump". The Nation. New York City: Katrina vanden Heuvel. Archived from the original on September 26, 2024.
- Lemann, Nicholas (November 2, 2020). "The Republican Identity Crisis After Trump". The New Yorker. Archived from the original on February 15, 2021.
- LeVine, Marianne; Arnsdorf, Isaac (December 13, 2023). "Trump backers laugh off, cheer 'dictator' comments, as scholars voice alarm". The Washington Post. ISSN 0190-8286. Archived from the original on December 15, 2023.
- Lewis, Matt (December 12, 2020). "Bad News for Evangelicals – God Doesn't Need Donald Trump in the White House". The Daily Beast (Opinion). Archived from the original on March 9, 2021 – via www.msn.com.
- Liu, William Ming (April 14, 2016). "How Trump's 'Toxic Masculinity' Is Bad for Other Men". Motto (Time). New York. Archived from the original on January 21, 2018.
- Lowndes, Joseph (November 8, 2021). "Far-right extremism dominates the GOP. It didn't start — and won't end — with Trump". The Washington Post. Archived from the original on November 23, 2021.
- Lutz, Eric (November 10, 2023). "Donald Trump Isn't Even Trying to Hide His Authoritarian Second-Term Plans". Vanity Fair. United States: Condé Nast. Archived from the original on September 26, 2024.
- Lusane, Clarence (February 15, 2024). "Donald Trump Makes a Mockery of the Constitution". ISSN 0027-8378.
- Lyall, Sarah (January 23, 2021). "The Trump Presidency Is Now History. So How Will It Rank?". The New York Times. Archived from the original on February 15, 2021.
- MacWilliams, Matthew (January 17, 2016). "The one weird trait that predicts whether you're a Trump supporter". Politico. Archived from the original on January 29, 2021.
- MacWilliams, Matthew C. (September 23, 2020). "Trump Is an Authoritarian. So Are Millions of Americans". Politico. Archived from the original on February 9, 2021.
- Matthews, Dylan (January 14, 2021). "The F Word". Vox. Archived from the original on January 24, 2021.
- Matthews, Dylan (October 23, 2020). "Is Trump a fascist? 8 experts weigh in". Vox. Archived from the original on January 4, 2022.
- McFadden, Robert D.; Grynbaum, Michael M. (February 18, 2021). "Rush Limbaugh Dies at 70; Turned Talk Radio Into a Right-Wing Attack Machine". The New York Times. Archived from the original on March 9, 2021.
- McCarthy, Tom; Ho, Vivian; Greve, Joan E. (January 7, 2021). "Schumer calls pro-Trump mob 'domestic terrorists' as Senate resumes election certification – live". The Guardian. Archived from the original on January 6, 2021.
- McConkey, David (October 23, 2022). "Pierre Poilievre, populist politician?". The Brandon Sun.
- Moore, Johnnie (August 24, 2017). "Evangelical Trump Adviser: Why I Won't Bail on the White House". Religion News Service. Archived from the original on February 15, 2021.
- Mullen, Lincoln (June 16, 2018). "The Fight to Define Romans 13". The Atlantic. Archived from the original on February 15, 2021.
- Platt, Brian (June 5, 2018). "Ontario Proud, the right-wing Facebook giant in Ontario's election, eyes federal election involvement". National Post.
- Nessen, Stephen (April 30, 2016). "4 Ways Donald Trump's Pro Wrestling Experience Is Like His Campaign Today". National Public Radio. Archived from the original on February 15, 2021.
- Newkirk, Vann R. (March 15, 2016). "Donald Trump, Wrestling Heel". The Atlantic. Archived from the original on December 1, 2020.
- "6 Books to Help Understand Trump's Win". The New York Times. November 9, 2016. Archived from the original on February 15, 2021.
- Nwachukwu, John Owen (May 1, 2018). "Biafra: IPOB reacts to Trump's warning to Buhari on killing of Christians". Daily Post. Archived from the original on September 5, 2022.
- Nwaubani, Adaobi Tricia (February 7, 2020). "Trump trashes Nigeria and bans its immigrants. Nigerians love him for it". The Washington Post. Archived from the original on February 24, 2021.
- O'Connor, Brendon (October 29, 2020). "Who exactly is Trump's 'base'? Why white, working-class voters could be key to the US election". The Conversation. Archived from the original on January 29, 2021.
- Oduah, Chika (November 14, 2016). "Nigeria's Biafra Separatists See Hope in Trump". VOA. Archived from the original on August 29, 2022.
- Parker, Ashley (November 16, 2020). "The ending of Trump's presidency echoes the beginning – with a lie". The Washington Post. Archived from the original on February 15, 2021.
- Paxton, Robert O. (January 11, 2021). "I've Hesitated to Call Donald Trump a Fascist. Until Now". Newsweek. Archived from the original on February 4, 2021.
- Partington, Richard (July 7, 2018). "Trump's trade war: What is it and which products are affected?". The Guardian. Archived from the original on February 15, 2021.
- Peters, Jeremy W. (November 9, 2020). "Trump Lost the Race. But Republicans Know It's Still His Party". The New York Times. Archived from the original on February 15, 2021.
- Peters, Jeremy W. (February 17, 2021). "Rush Limbaugh's Legacy of Venom: As Trump Rose, 'It All Sounded Familiar'". The New York Times. The New York Times. Archived from the original on March 9, 2021.
- Smith, Gregory A. (April 26, 2017). "Among white evangelicals, regular churchgoers are the most supportive of Trump". Pew Research Center. Archived from the original on March 12, 2021.
- Swan, Jonathan; Savage, Charlie; Haberman, Maggie (July 17, 2023). "Trump and Allies Forge Plans to Increase Presidential Power in 2025". The New York Times.
- Swan, Jonathan; Savage, Charlie; Haberman, Maggie (December 9, 2023). "Fears of a NATO Withdrawal Rise as Trump Seeks a Return to Power". The New York Times. Archived from the original on December 10, 2023.
- Phillips, Dom; Phillips, Tom (December 20, 2019). "Brazil: Bolsonaro in homophobic outburst as corruption scandal swirls". The Guardian. Archived from the original on February 2, 2021.
- Pillar, Paul R. (September 17, 2020). "The Donald Trump and Benjamin Netanyahu Alliance: Simply Bad News". The National Interest. Archived from the original on March 1, 2021.
- Plott, Elaina (October 27, 2020). "Win or Lose, It's Donald Trump's Republican Party". The New York Times. Archived from the original on October 29, 2020.
- Raupp, Eric (December 12, 2020). "Will Bolsonaro Leave Trumpism Behind to Embrace a Biden-led US?". Fair Observer. Archived from the original on December 18, 2020.
- Robertson, Derek (May 16, 2020). "What Liberals Don't Get About Trump Supporters and Pop Culture". Politico. Archived from the original on January 30, 2021.
- Roper, Willern (January 8, 2021). "Nearly Half of Republicans Approve of Capitol Riot". Statista. Archived from the original on December 24, 2021.
- Rosenfeld, Steven (August 9, 2019). "Leading Civil Rights Lawyer Shows 20 Ways Trump Is Copying Hitler's Early Rhetoric and Policies". Common Dreams. Archived from the original on February 15, 2021.
- Rosenberg, Matthew; Rutenberg, Jim (February 1, 2021). "Key Takeaways From Trump's Effort to Overturn the Election – A Times examination of the 77 days between election and inauguration shows how a lie the former president had been grooming for years overwhelmed the Republican Party and stoked the assault on the Capitol". The New York Times. Archived from the original on February 1, 2021.
- Ross, Alex (December 5, 2016). "The Frankfurt school knew Trump was coming". The New Yorker. Archived from the original on December 13, 2020.
- Rushkoff, Douglas (July 7, 2016). "The New Nationalism Of Brexit And Trump Is A Product Of The Digital Age". Fast Company. Archived from the original on March 1, 2017.
- Rutenberg, Jim; Becker, Jo; Lipton, Eric; Haberman, Maggie; Martin, Jonathan; Rosenberg, Matthew; Schmidt, Michael S. (January 31, 2021). "77 Days: Trump's Campaign to Subvert the Election Hours after the United States voted, the president declared the election a fraud – a lie that unleashed a movement that would shatter democratic norms and upend the peaceful transfer of power". The New York Times. Archived from the original on February 1, 2021.
- Samphir, Harrison (July 23, 2019). "The Post Millennial joins Conservative party's online booster club". NOW Magazine. Archived from the original on July 24, 2019.
- Schneider, Mac (April 21, 2017). "Marine Le Pen: France's Trump is on the rise". Vox. Archived from the original on December 24, 2021.
- Seeßlen, Georg (February 2, 2017). "Sprachattacke der Rechtspopulisten: Trompeten des Trumpismus" [Language attack of the right-wing populists: Trumpets of Trumpism]. Der Spiegel (in German). Archived from the original on February 15, 2021.
- Serhan, Yasmeen (February 16, 2021). "What History Tells Us Will Happen to Trumpism". The Atlantic. Archived from the original on February 17, 2021.
- Serwer, Adam (November 20, 2017). "The Nationalist's Delusion". The Atlantic. Archived from the original on February 15, 2021.
- Shabad, Rebecca; Bennett, Geoff; Alba, Monica; Pettypiece, Shannon (June 2, 2020). "'The Bible is not a prop': Religious leaders, lawmakers outraged over Trump church visit". NBC News. Archived from the original on February 15, 2021.
- Shellnutt, Kate (September 6, 2017). "Should Christians Keep Advising a President They Disagree With?". Christianity Today. Archived from the original on February 15, 2021.
- Shenk, Timothy (August 16, 2016). "The dark history of Donald Trump's rightwing revolt". The Guardian. Archived from the original on April 14, 2019.
- Solon, Olivia (November 10, 2016). "Facebook's failure: Did fake news and polarized politics get Trump elected?". The Guardian. Archived from the original on January 14, 2017.
- Stone, Peter (November 22, 2023). "'Openly authoritarian campaign': Trump's threats of revenge fuel alarm". The Guardian. Archived from the original on November 27, 2023.
- "What Brazil's President, Jair Bolsonaro, has said about Brazil's Indigenous Peoples". survivalinternational.org. 2020. Archived from the original on April 8, 2021.
- Tabatabai, Ariane (July 15, 2020). "QAnon Goes to Iran". Foreign Policy. Archived from the original on May 23, 2022.
- Tarnoff, Ben (November 9, 2016). "The triumph of Trumpism: the new politics that is here to stay". The Guardian. Archived from the original on February 15, 2021.
- Tashman, Brian (October 8, 2011). "Jeffress Says Satan Is Behind Roman Catholicism". Right Wing Watch. Archived from the original on September 19, 2016.
- Tharoor, Ishaan (July 11, 2018). "Trump's NATO trip shows 'America First' is 'America Alone'". The Washington Post. Washington D.C. Archived from the original on February 15, 2021.
- Tharoor, Ishaan (August 21, 2022). "Analysis | Trump's personality cult and the erosion of U.S. democracy". The Washington Post. ISSN 0190-8286. Archived from the original on August 31, 2023.
- Teague, Matthew (June 3, 2020). "'He wears the armor of God': evangelicals hail Trump's church photo op". The Guardian. Archived from the original on February 15, 2021.
- Matt Galloway (Host), Allan Rock (Guest) (November 6, 2020). "Allan Rock on what the presidential election means for U.S.-Canada relations". The Current. CBC. Archived from the original on December 24, 2021.
- Thompson, Derek (December 30, 2020). "The Deep Story of Trumpism- Thinking about the Republican Party like a political psychiatrist". The Atlantic. Archived from the original on April 14, 2021.
- Todd, Chuck; Murray, Mike; Dann, Carrie (April 28, 2021). "After 100 days out of office, Trump's support softens in NBC News poll". NBC News. Archived from the original on April 30, 2021.
- Trump, Donald J. (September 25, 2019). "Remarks of President Trump at the 74th Session of the United Nations General Assembly". whitehouse.gov. Archived from the original on March 9, 2021 – via National Archives. "In everything we do, we are focused on empowering the dreams and aspirations of our citizens ... we will cast off the enemies of liberty and overcome the oppressors of dignity."
- Vallejo, Justin (February 28, 2021). "Donald Trump CPAC speech". The Independent. Archived from the original on March 1, 2021.
- Von Rennenkampff, Markik (September 13, 2021). "Canada's Conservatives show how dangerously skewed US politics have become". The Hill.
- Ward, Myah (October 12, 2024). "We watched 20 Trump rallies. His racist, anti-immigrant messaging is getting darker". Politico.
- Weber, Thomas (January 24, 2021). "Trump is not a fascist. But that didn't make him any less dangerous to our democracy". CNN (Opinion). Archived from the original on February 20, 2021.
- Wehner, Peter (July 5, 2016). "The Theology of Donald Trump". The New York Times (Opinion). New York. Archived from the original on January 14, 2021.
- Wehner, Peter (January 21, 2017). "Why I Cannot Fall in Line Behind Trump". The New York Times (Opinion). Archived from the original on February 13, 2021.
- Wehner, Peter (July 5, 2019). "The Deepening Crisis in Evangelical Christianity". The Atlantic. Archived from the original on April 23, 2021.
- Wehner, Peter (December 7, 2020). "Trump's Most Malicious Legacy". The Atlantic. Archived from the original on May 14, 2021.
- Weisbrot, Mark (October 20, 2017). "Brazil's Donald Trump?". U.S. News & World Report (Opinion). Archived from the original on March 2, 2018.
- West, Cornel (November 17, 2016). "American Neoliberalism: A New Neo-Fascist Era Is Here". The Guardian (Opinion). Archived from the original on November 17, 2016.
- Livesey, Bruce (October 8, 2020). "All the elements are in place for American-style fascism, says Cornel West". National Observer (Canada) (interview). Archived from the original on January 18, 2021.
- Whitebook, Joel (March 20, 2017). "Opinion: Trump's Method, Our Madness". The New York Times. Archived from the original on May 15, 2021.
- Will, George F. (July 10, 2020). "The difference between Trumpism and fascism" (Opinion). The Washington Post. Archived from the original on February 15, 2021.
- Wintour, Patrick (September 21, 2020). "US announces new Iran sanctions and claims it is enforcing UN arms embargo". The Guardian. ISSN 0261-3077. Archived from the original on February 15, 2021.
- Wolf, Zachary B. (November 9, 2020). "Election 2020: How the Trump administration's roadblocks could cause problems for Biden". CNN. Archived from the original on November 30, 2020. Update November 10, 2020.
- Woods, Mel (June 11, 2020). "Erin O'Toole's 'Take Back Canada' Slogan Prompts Plenty Of Questions". HuffPost. Archived from the original on June 8, 2021.
- Zaretsky, Robert (July 7, 2016). "Donald Trump and the myth of mobocracy". The Atlantic. Archived from the original on February 7, 2021.
- Zengerle, Patricia (February 2, 2019). "With eye on Afghanistan talks, Trump vows to stop 'endless wars'". Reuters.com. Archived from the original on November 7, 2020.
- Zurcher, Anthony (August 26, 2020). "RNC 2020: The Republican Party Now the Party of Trump". BBC News. Archived from the original on November 1, 2020.
