= Chertow =

Chertow is a surname. Notable people with the surname include:

- Ken Chertow (born 1966), American Olympian wrestler
- Marian Chertow, American academic

== See also ==
- Chernow
