= Sleeth (surname) =

Sleeth is a surname. Notable people with the surname include:

- Billy Sleeth, American soccer player
- Kyle Sleeth, American baseball player
- Lou Sleeth, Australian rules footballer
- Matthew Sleeth, one of multiple people with the same name
- Nancy Sleeth, American environmentalist
- Natalie Sleeth, American composer

== See also ==
- Sleeth (disambiguation)
