= Richard Cizik =

Richard Cizik (/ˈsaɪzɪk/ SYE-zik) is Executive Director of the nonprofit Evangelicals for Democracy, and Co-Host of the new YouTube Podcast, "Your Voice Matters: Democracy in Action, a Discussion on Faith and Democracy. Evangelicals for Democracy. He was the Vice President for Governmental Affairs of the National Association of Evangelicals (NAE) and one of the most prominent Evangelical lobbyists in the United States. In his position with the NAE, Cizik's primary responsibilities were setting the organization's policy on issues and lobbying the White House, Congress, and the Supreme Court. Cizik also served as NAE's national spokesman and edited a monthly magazine, NAE Washington Insight. Since 2003, Cizik has been active in a type of environmentalism known as "creation care". His stance on global warming has drawn both support and criticism from fellow Evangelicals. He serves on the board of advisors of the Nicholas Institute for Environmental Policy Solutions at Duke University.

== Biography ==
He studied in political science at Whitworth College and earned a Bachelor of Arts cum laude, then he studied in Public Affairs at Elliott School of International Affairs (George Washington University) and earned a Master of Arts in 1974. He also studied at Denver Seminary and earned a Master of Divinity. He was awarded a post-graduate fellowship by the Rotary International Foundation to study at the Political Science University in Taipei, Taiwan (1975–1976).

=== Career ===
==== National Association of Evangelicals ====
Cizik was the primary lobbyist at the NAE from 1980 to 2008. He described himself in the early years as a "pro-Bush conservative" and generally took conservative positions on issues such as gay marriage, abortion, and stem-cell research. As the organization's primary lobbyist, Cizik was influential in pushing conservative Evangelical-supported legislation at a national level. However, he began moving more towards the center in the 1990s. On December 11, 2008, Cizik resigned from his position with the NAE following a December 2 broadcast of NPR's Fresh Air in which he said he had voted for Barack Obama in the 2008 presidential election and expressed support for same-sex civil unions. His remarks on same-sex civil unions and his broader political views drew criticism from some evangelical leaders and were widely reported in the press. In a later Fresh Air interview in July 2010, Cizik said his resignation was "a sum total of everything," including his advocacy of creation care and climate change, a broader public agenda, and his comments on civil unions, which he said "offended the old guard."

In 2007, Virginia Governor Tim Kaine named Cizik to the Virginia Climate Commission. That appointment has led to his speaking on climate change at the University of Virginia, Eastern Mennonite University, Roanoke College, among many other universities around the country.

Cizik has subsequently been a regular participant in Global Zero gatherings, including Summits held in London, England, and the Ronald Reagan Library in Simi Valley, California, and as a speaker at the Global Zero Inaugural Conference, held in Paris, in December, 2008.

As national spokesman for millions of evangelicals, he has worked successfully with both Democrats and Republicans. In the fall of 2008, however, he began to publicly criticize John McCain ("I thought John McCain was a principled person," "But John McCain...seems to be waffling on issue after issue"). He voted for Barack Obama during the primaries, and strongly implied that he had voted for Obama in the general election.

On December 11, 2008, Cizik gave his resignation from his position with NAE after a December 2 radio broadcast of NPR's Fresh Air in which he voiced support for same-sex civil unions. His comments and his resignation have generated both strong support and strong criticism within the evangelical Christian community. This, along with statements about abortion, did not represent the NAE's position.

==== Environmental activism ====
After hearing scientist and fellow Evangelical John Houghton present evidence on global warming in 2002, Cizik was convinced that environmentalism, and especially climate change, should be a part of the Evangelical political agenda.

Some conservative evangelical leaders had earlier criticized Cizik's environmental advocacy and public comments on climate change and politics, arguing that his positions did not reflect the NAE's traditional priorities.

Cizik calls this environmentalism "creation care." He differentiates "creation care" from other environmentalism because of the former's roots "not in politics or ideology, but in the scriptures." Cizik cites several Bible verses to support his position, including Genesis 2:15 and Revelation 11:18.

Cizik has been criticized for his global warming advocacy by fellow evangelicals and conservatives. He has responded to some of these critics by asking whether his critics are possibly being influenced by ties to the conservative movement or oil and gas companies.

Cizik's name appeared as a signatory on an initial draft of the 2006 Evangelical Climate Initiative's "Call to Action," but it was absent from the final draft. In an interview with Bill Moyers, Cizik indicated that pressure from his colleagues at the NAE caused him to remove his name from the statement. In fact the Executive Committee, responding to twenty Evangelical leaders who asked the NAE not to take a stance on global warming, had passed a resolution stating that "global warming is not a consensus issue" and instructing its staff "to stand by and not exceed in any fashion our approved and adopted statements concerning the environment contained within the Evangelical Call to Civic Responsibility." (The 2001 document, For the Health of the Nation: An Evangelical Call to Civic Responsibility, includes a section on "protect[ing] God's creation" but does not mention climate change.)

In January 2007, Cizik and Eric Chivian co-hosted the launch of a collaboration between scientists and Evangelicals, presenting it as a joint project of Harvard Medical School's Center for Health and the Global Environment and the NAE. The 28 participants released "An Urgent Call to Action," which presented human-induced climate change as a primary concern and called for prompt public policy solutions. Critics of the collaboration pointed out that the NAE had not changed its position on climate change, but in response to a reporter's question Cizik insisted that the NAE board had approved "this dialogue."

In March 2007, James Dobson, head of Focus on the Family, and 24 other evangelical leaders signed a letter asking "the NAE board to ensure that Mr. Cizik faithfully represents the policies and commitments of the organization, including its defense of traditional values," and suggesting that Cizik resign "if he cannot be trusted to articulate the views of American evangelicals on environmental issues." A number of other evangelical leaders declined to sign Dobson's letter on the grounds that it was un-Christian. Richard Land of the Southern Baptist Convention noted, "I didn't feel that it was the most productive, most redemptive way to address the problem," and Leith Anderson, NAE president, stated that his mail was "overwhelmingly supportive of Rich." Cizik has responded by saying that "It's time we return to being people known for our love and care of the earth and our fellow human beings."

In December 2008, NAE President Leith Anderson reiterated that For the Health of the Nation contains the NAE's only official position on the environment, and confirmed that "we don't [have a specific position] on global warming or emissions. [Cizik] has spoken as an individual on that."

==== Various commitments ====
In January 2010, Cizik launched the New Evangelical Partnership for the Common Good together with David P. Gushee, professor of Christian Ethics at Mercer University, and Steve Martin, a pastor and documentary filmmaker.

In 2010, Cizik helped create and serves as co-chair of "The Casablanca Institute" to foster interfaith dialogue, build relationships between Evangelical Christians and Muslim leaders, and to seek common ground on the major issues facing both religious constituencies and the planet. In 2013, the Casablanca Institute was named one of the top ten "Best New Think Tanks" in a global ranking called "Global Go To Think Tank Rankings.

From 2010 to 2012, Rev. Cizik served as Co-chair along with R. Scott Appleby, Ph.D., professor of Political Science and Muslim fundamentalism scholar at Notre Dame, of the Chicago Council on Global Affairs Project entitled "Engaging Religious Communities Abroad: A New Imperative of U.S. Foreign Policy. The two-year project brought together 20 top government officials, diplomats, defense-policy experts, and religious leaders to examine recent foreign-policy history of the U.S. in the Muslim world and make recommendations for future engagement. The Report was distributed to U.S. Embassies around the globe by the U.S. Department of State.

In 2012, Rich Cizik became the Chief Spokesperson for the Good Steward Campaign, an ecumenically Christian environmental organization working on college campuses to inform and engage students in conversations about climate change, stewardship, creation care, and fossil fuel divestment. Rich travels up and down the East Coast doing speaking events for the Good Steward Campaign and spoken at schools like the University of Virginia and Eastern Mennonite University. He continues in this role today.

In 2020, Cizik served as Co-Chair of "Evangelicals for Biden," an effort that successfully brought former Trump supporters over to Biden's side, particularly in Michigan and Georgia. In Michigan, for example, Trump's support among evangelicals dropped from 81% in 2016 to 70%. These conservative evangelicals who switched sides helped the Biden coalition to win necessary electoral votes to put Joseph Biden in the White House.

In 2022, Cizik founded the "Evangelicals for Democracy," a project of the New Evangelical Partnership for the Common Good, and a separate organization.

== Opinions ==
=== Gay rights issues ===
Cizik supported the passage of Proposition 8 and recently signed his name to a full-page ad in The New York Times' accusing the gay population of "anti-religious bigotry", especially against Mormons, and "trying to start a religious war." In response, a gay rights group placed another full-page advertisement in The Salt Lake Tribune titled "Lies in the name of the Lord" and featuring Pinocchio carrying a whitewashed "Cizik Version" of the Bible.

Cizik made a statement on the National Public Radio program "Fresh Air" in December 2008 in which he said that he supports same-sex civil unions and is "shifting" on gay marriage. He also commented that about 4 in 10 young evangelicals have a homosexual, bisexual, or transsexual friend or family member and about 5 in 10 favor either same-sex marriage or civil unions. Cizik later appeared to shift his position, releasing a statement reading: "I am now and always have been committed to work to pass laws that protect and foster family life, and to work against government attempts to interfere with the integrity of the family, including same-sex 'marriage' and civil unions." However, in a return visit to "Fresh Air" in July 2010, Cizik reiterated his support for same-sex civil unions and expressed his ambivalence about same-sex marriage. His NPR remarks led Cizik to resign from his position with the NAE.

Cizik's statements found support by some older evangelicals such as Jim Wallis and by many younger evangelicals, some of which ABC News says consider Cizik as a "hero". In contrast, the NAE stated that Ciziks' positions do not "appropriately represent the values and convictions" of the NAE. David Brody, Christian Broadcasting Network correspondent, commented on the divided reaction by saying that "At the end of the day, evangelicals are not going to budge on the life and marriage issues."

=== Abortion and health care ===
Cizik has described himself as an "advocate for pro-life policies without exception." He supports government distribution of contraception. He has stated that "younger evangelicals [...] are decidedly pro-life" and that "health care is just as important to younger evangelicals as is abortion." Cizik also conceived and helped draft the definite statement on evangelical support for family planning in 2012 entitled "A Christian Call to Common Ground on Family Planning, Maternal and Children's Health and Abortion Reduction" released at the National Press Club in Washington, D.C., on October 15, 2012.

On December 24, 2012, Newsweek wrote in a piece entitled "Can Safe Sex Save the Earth?" that "If his ouster [National Association of Evangelicals] was meant to silence him, it didn't work." And that "Cizik has also made the case that access to contraceptives is not only good for people, but also, since it helps curb overpopulation, good for the planet. On his blog, he calls family planning a "green technology."

== Recognition ==
Cizik was named in 2006 by Beliefnet to be one of the "Most Inspirational" leaders of the year.

Fast Company magazine named him in 2008 to a list of "Most Creative Thinkers." He was named an Open Society Fellow of the Open Society Institute in 2009 to 2010, during which time he built relationships between scholars and activists on topics such as war and peace, climate change, and criminal justice.

In 2008, he and Nobel Prize Laureate Eric Chivian were jointly named by Time magazine as one of the 100 most influential scientists and thinkers in the world.

In 2010, he was named to a list of "Fifty Evangelical Leaders Who Shaped a Generation: The Renegade," by Roof Top Blog, WordPress and appeared in the acclaimed documentary on nuclear arms, directed by Lucy Walker and distributed by Participant Media, entitled "Countdown To Zero."

On May 18, 2014, Whitworth University, awarded Cizik an honorary Doctorate of Humane Letters. The University's Provost stated that "Richard Cizik, an alumnus from the class of 1973, is a pastor, writer, environmentalist, thinker, and activist...For his commitment to truth and to the Lordship of Jesus Christ, to the health of our planet and the well-being of humanity, and in recognition of his strength of purpose and his courage in speaking out on crucial issues as a thoughtful and fully committed man of God, I am proud to represent Whitworth University as we confer upon Richard Cizik this degree of doctor of humane letters, honoris causa."

== See also ==
- God's Warriors, a controversial CNN news program where Christiane Amanpour labeled Cizik as one of "God's Christian Warriors".
