= Daniel C. Esty =

American lawyer

Daniel Esty
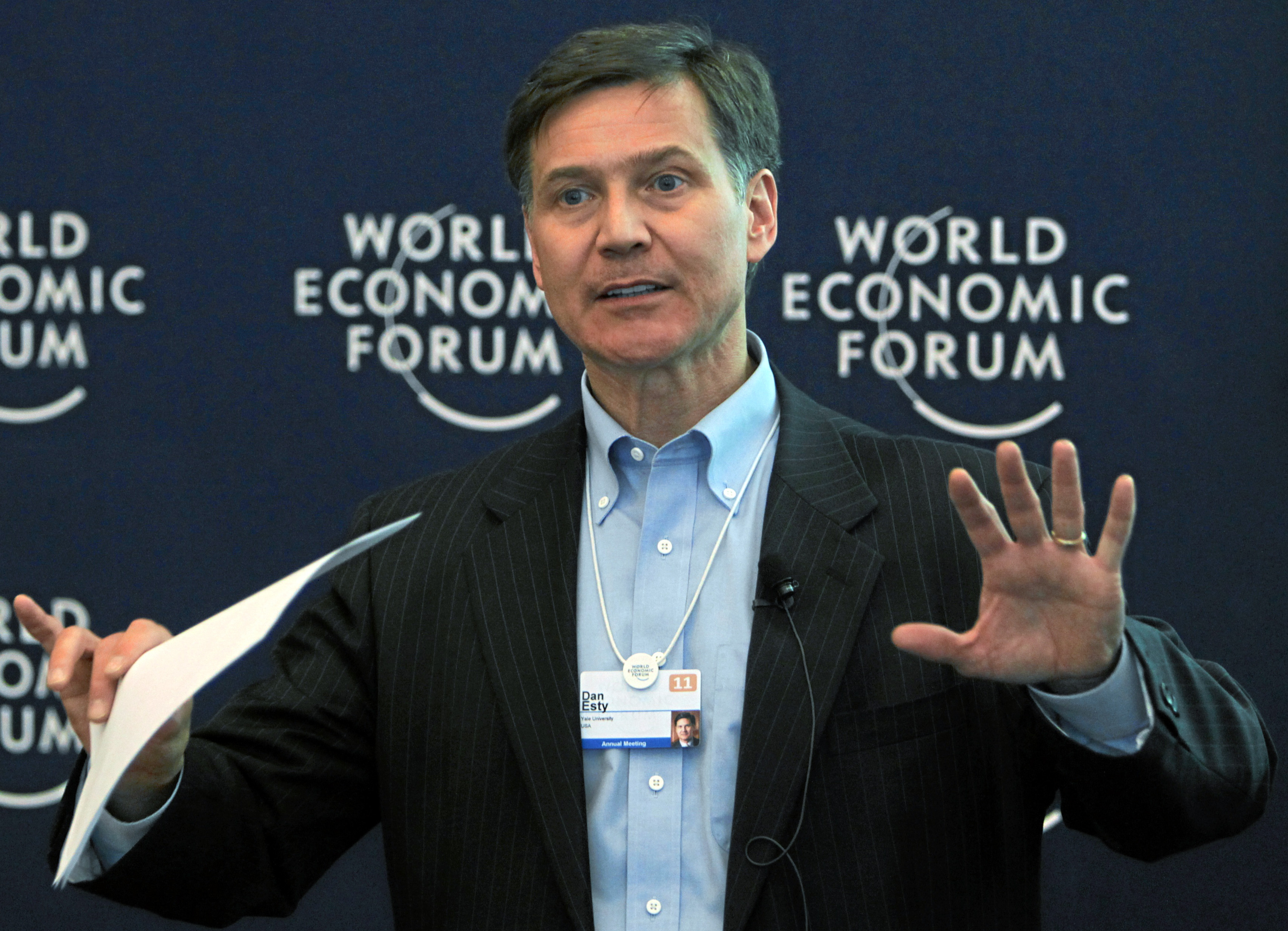

Commissioner of the Connecticut Department of Energy and Environmental Protection
- In office 2011–2014

Personal details
- Born: June 6, 1959 (age 67) Massachusetts, U.S.
- Party: Democratic
- Spouse: Elizabeth Esty
- Children: 3
- Education: Harvard University (BA); Balliol College, Oxford (MA); Yale University (JD)

Daniel C. Esty (born June 6, 1959) is an American environmental lawyer, policymaker, academic, and corporate sustainability adviser. He is the Hillhouse Professor at Yale University with primary appointments in the Yale Law School and the Yale School of the Environment, and secondary appointments at Yale's Jackson School of Global Affairs and the Yale School of Management. He also serves as Director of the Yale Center for Environmental Law and Policy and Co‑Director of the Yale Initiative on Sustainable Finance

Esty is known for his research and writing related to environmental law and policy, corporate sustainability, global governance, climate change, sustainability metrics, and trade law reform. He co-leads the Remaking Trade Project, a global network of policymakers and scholars working to reconfigure the international trade system reconfigured to better align with the 21^{st} Century sustainability imperative. With a team of researchers at Yale and Columbia, Esty created the Environmental Performance Index.

From 2011 to 2014, Esty served as Commissioner of the Connecticut Department of Energy and Environmental Protection, where he led the drafting of the state's first comprehensive energy strategy, launched Connecticut's first-in-the-nation Green Bank to finance renewable energy and energy efficiency programs, and helped restructure regulatory systems toward market-based approaches. He served a senior energy and environment advisor to the Obama for President campaign in 2007-08 and on the Obama/Biden Presidential transition team in 2008-09.

Esty is a commentator on business, energy, and climate change issues and has been quoted in major publications including The Financial Times, The Wall Street Journal, The New York Times, Harvard Business Review, Nature, The Economist, HuffPost, and Scientific American. He has appeared numerous times on NPR and various television programs (such as The Colbert Report and Fox & Friends) as well as podcasts including The Energy Gang, The Trade Guys, Resources Radio, and Columbia Energy Exchange.

== Education ==
Esty earned a Bachelor of Arts in economics from Harvard College. He studied as a Rhodes Scholar at Balliol College, Oxford, receiving a Master of Arts in philosophy, politics, and economics, and serving as captain of the Oxford ice hockey team. He earned a Juris Doctor from Yale Law School.

== Career ==
Esty began his legal career as a corporate, trade, administrative, and environmental law attorney at Arnold & Porter in Washington, D.C., from 1986 to 1989.

From 1989 to 1993, he served in senior leadership positions at the United States Environmental Protection Agency, beginning as Special Assistant to EPA Administrator William Reilly, then as Deputy Chief of Staff, and finally as Deputy Assistant Administrator for Policy. In these roles, he helped to lead EPA's regulatory review process and participated in key international negotiations including those leading to the 1993 North American Free Trade Agreement and 1992 Framework Convention on Climate Change.

In 1993 and 1994, Esty was a Senior Fellow at the Peterson Institute for International Economics, where he wrote Greening the GATT, a highly regarded critique of the international trade system.

Esty joined Yale University in 1994, becoming the Hillhouse Professor of Environmental Law and Policy in 2002.

Esty has held visiting professorships at INSEAD (France), University of Copenhagen (Denmark), EGADE Business School (Mexico), and University of Aix-Marseille (France).

== Advisory and board service ==
Esty has served on more than a dozen corporate sustainability advisory boards, including Unilever, The Coca-Cola Company, Tetra Pak, Brown Advisory, and Dimensional Fund Advisors. He has been a sustainability strategy advisor to more than 100 companies across sectors and around the world, including Alcoa, American Eagle, Delhaize, Disney, FedEx, Hanes Brands, Harrah's Entertainment, IBM, 3M, Nokia, Scotts Miracle-Gro, Shaklee, State Farm, Timex, Waste Management, and Verizon.

He has also served as a trustee or advisor for the Energy Future Coalition, Resources for the Future, Connecticut Fund for the Environment, the Nature Conservancy of Connecticut, Sustainable Technology Capital, American Farmland Trust, and the U.S. Trade Representative's Trade and Environment Public Advisory Committee.

=== Publications ===
Esty has authored or edited 14 books and more than 100 scholarly articles on environmental policy, sustainability, corporate strategy, competitiveness, trade, globalization, and regulatory approaches. Notable books include Greening the GATT: Trade, Environment, and the Future, Green to Gold: How Smart Companies Use Environmental Strategy to Innovate, Create Value, and Build Competitive Advantage, The Green to Gold Business Playbook, Values at Work: Sustainable Investing and ESG Reporting, and A Better Planet: 40 Big Ideas for a Sustainable Future. A Better Planet was named a top sustainability book by The Financial Times.

== Personal life ==
He is married to Elizabeth Esty, former U.S. Representative for Connecticut's 5th congressional district and former member of the Connecticut House of Representatives. They have three children, Sarah, Thomas, and Jonathan.

== Selected publications ==
=== Books ===
- Esty, Daniel C.; Cort, Todd, eds. (2020). Values at Work: Sustainable Investing and ESG Reporting. Palgrave Macmillan.
- Esty, Daniel C., ed. (2019). A Better Planet: 40 Big Ideas for a Sustainable Future. Yale University Press. ISBN 978-0300237351.
- Esty, Daniel C.; Simmons, P.J. (2011). Green to Gold Business Playbook: How to Implement Sustainability Practices for Bottom-Line Results in Every Business Function. Yale University Press.
- Esty, Daniel C.; Winston, Andrew (2006). Green to Gold: How Smart Companies Use Environmental Strategy to Innovate, Create Value, and Build Competitive Advantage. Yale University Press. [Paperback edition (2009) John Wiley Publishing]
- Esty, Daniel C. (1994). Greening the GATT: Trade, Environment, and the Future. Peterson Institute for International Economics. ISBN 978-0881322057.

=== Journal articles (selected) ===
- Esty, Daniel C.; Trachtman, Joel; Remy, Jan Yves (2025). "Remaking Trade for a Sustainable Future". Journal of International Economic Law.
- Esty, Daniel C.; Dominioni, Goran (2023). "Designing Effective Border Carbon Adjustment Mechanisms: Aligning the Global Trade and Climate Change Regimes". Arizona Law Review. 65 (1).
- Esty, Daniel C. (2022). "Mastering the Labyrinth of Sustainability: Toward a New Foundation for the Market Economy". Revue Europeenne du Droit.
- Esty, Daniel C.; Elliott, E. Donald (2021). "The End Externalities Manifesto: A Rights-Based Foundation for Environmental Law". NYU Environmental Law Journal. 29 (3).
- Esty, Daniel C.; Karpilow, Quentin (2019). "Harnessing Investor Interest in Sustainability: The Next Frontier in Environmental Information Regulation". Yale Journal on Regulation. 36 (2).
- Esty, Daniel C. (2017). "Red Lights to Green Lights: From 20th Century Environmental Regulation to 21st Century Sustainability". Environmental Law. 47 (1).
- Esty, Daniel C. (2016). "Regulatory Transformation". Public Administration Review. 76 (3).
- Esty, Daniel C.; Lubin, David (2010). "The Sustainability Imperative". Harvard Business Review.
- Esty, Daniel C. (2006). "Good Governance at the Supranational Scale: Globalizing Administrative Law". Yale Law Journal. 115 (7).
- Esty, Daniel C. (2004). "Environmental Protection in the Information Age". NYU Law Review. 79 (1).
