= Cornwall Alliance =

Evangelical anti-environmental front group

Coordinates: 35°02′44″N 89°41′32″W

The Cornwall Alliance for the Stewardship of Creation is a conservative Christian public policy group promoting a free-market approach to care for the environment as sufficient. It is critical of much of the current environmental movement. The Alliance is "engaged in a wide range of antienvironmental activities" and denies man-made global warming.

Originally called the "Interfaith Stewardship Alliance", it was founded in 2005 in reaction to the efforts of evangelical leaders, such as Rick Warren, to fight global warming. The name Cornwall came from the 2000 Cornwall Declaration. The organization's views on the environment have been strongly influenced by the wise use movement of the 1980s and 1990s. It is a member of the Atlas Network and also has ties to The Heritage Foundation.

== Cornwall Declaration ==
In 2000, a statement called the Cornwall Declaration on Environmental Stewardship was put forward and has been signed by over 1,500 clergy, theologians and others according to Cornwall Alliance. Signatories include prominent American religious individuals from the Roman Catholic, Jewish, and Evangelical worlds such as Charles Colson, James Dobson, Rabbi Jacob Neusner, R. C. Sproul, Richard John Neuhaus, and D. James Kennedy.

The declaration states that human beings should be regarded as "producers and stewards" rather than "consumers and polluters". It states:

The Cornwall Declaration further sets forth an articulate and Biblically-grounded set of beliefs and aspirations in which God can be glorified through a world in which "human beings care wisely and humbly for all creatures" and "widespread economic freedom…makes sound ecological stewardship available to ever greater numbers."

The declaration expresses concern over what it calls "unfounded or undue concerns" of environmentalists such as "fears of destructive manmade global warming, overpopulation, and rampant species loss".

== Evangelical Declaration on Global Warming ==
In July 2006, the Cornwall Alliance published an open letter in response to Christian leaders of the Evangelical Climate Initiative who had, in February of the same year, expressed concern over man-made global warming, urging legislators to consider a cap-and-trade system, promoting new technology and reducing carbon emissions from the burning of fossil fuels. Advisory board member Wayne Grudem was quoted in reply saying, "It does not seem likely to me that God would set up the world to work in such a way that human beings would eventually destroy the earth by doing such ordinary and morally good and necessary things as breathing, building a fire to cook or keep warm, burning fuel to travel, or using energy for a refrigerator to preserve food."

The missive was accompanied by "Call to Truth, Prudence and the Protection of the Poor", a paper discussing the theology, science and economics of climate change, denying that dangerous anthropogenic global warming was taking place at all, and describing mandatory emission reduction as a "draconian measure" that would deprive people of cheap energy and hurt the poor. The letter was endorsed by over 170 individuals, including atmospheric physicist Richard Lindzen, palaeontologist Robert M. Carter and former Energy & Environment journal editor Sonja Boehmer-Christiansen.

On December 2, 2009, the Cornwall Alliance issued a statement called "An Evangelical Declaration on Global Warming", in which they declare in list form both "What We Believe" and "What We Deny". The first point from each list is;

We believe Earth and its ecosystems – created by God’s intelligent design and infinite power and sustained by His faithful providence – are robust, resilient, self-regulating, and self-correcting, admirably suited for human flourishing, and displaying His glory. Earth’s climate system is no exception. Recent global warming is one of many natural cycles of warming and cooling in geologic history.
We deny that Earth and its ecosystems are the fragile and unstable products of chance, and particularly that Earth’s climate system is vulnerable to dangerous alteration because of minuscule changes in atmospheric chemistry. Recent warming was neither abnormally large nor abnormally rapid. There is no convincing scientific evidence that human contribution to greenhouse gases is causing dangerous global warming.

Prominent signatories of the declaration include climate scientist Roy Spencer, climatologist David Legates, meteorologist Joseph D'Aleo, television meteorologist James Spann, and Neil Frank, former director of the National Hurricane Center.

According to social scientists Riley Dunlap and Aaron McCright the declaration "was laden with denialist claims and designed to counteract progressive Christians’ efforts to generate support for dealing with climate change".

Along with the "Evangelical Declaration", Cornwall Alliance issued "A Renewed Call to Truth, Prudence, and Protection of the Poor". The executive summary of their document states,

The world is in the grip of an idea: that burning fossil fuels to provide affordable, abundant energy is causing global warming that will be so dangerous that we must stop it by reducing our use of fossil fuels, no matter the cost. Is that idea true? We believe not. We believe that idea – we'll call it "global warming alarmism" – fails the tests of theology, science, and economics.

== Criticism ==
The website Skeptical Science has published criticism of the Cornwall Alliance.

Critics of the Cornwall Alliance have accused the organization of being a "front group for fossil fuel special interests," citing its strong ties to the Committee for a Constructive Tomorrow, which in the past was funded by oil industry giants such as Exxon-Mobil and Chevron.

== See also ==
- Christianity and environmentalism
- Evangelical environmentalism
- The Heritage Foundation
