= Evangelical Climate Initiative =

The Evangelical Climate Initiative (ECI) is a campaign by US-American church leaders and organizations to promote market based mechanisms to mitigate global warming.

== History ==
The Evangelical Climate Initiative was launched in February 2006 by the National Association of Evangelicals. The NAE worked with the Center for Health and the Global Environment at Harvard Medical School to bring scientists and evangelical Christian leaders together to mitigate climate change.

The two groups agreed that the Earth "is seriously imperiled by human behavior," and that this was affecting the "poorest of the poor, well over a billion people, who have little chance to improve their lives". The initiative stated that saving the creation required nothing short of a new moral awakening "clearly articulated in Scripture and supported by science”.

At this time Richard Cizik was the vice-president for governmental affairs at the NAE and an advocate of creation care. At this time, not all NAE members were in agreement with the ECI initiative and its statements calling for protecting the earth from global warming, pollution and extinctions.

The ECI was initially signed by 86 evangelical leaders and the presidents of 39 evangelical colleges. The number of signatories had risen to over 100 by December 2007, and as of July 2011 over 220 evangelical leaders (including the NAE) had signed the call to action. David P. Gushee, a professor of Christian ethics at Mercer University, helped draft the document.

== Reception ==
The initiative was initially well received, with endorsements from public figures including Pat Robertson, Al Sharpton and Mike Huckabee. It appeared that pressure from voters could make a change in government policies.

In 2009, the Tea Party movement was founded in Chicago. This was a conservative movement within the Republican party which had several beliefs, including reduced government spending. They stated that they opposed the teaching of ‘global warming theory’ in schools and that the ‘regulation of carbon dioxide in our atmosphere should be left to God and not government’. As the Tea Party became more popular, climate skepticism and hostility towards climate science and policies became more prevalent in the US.

== Legacy ==
The US is the only developed country where religious background can be linked to belief in environmentalism. These differing religious views on climate and creation care can be seen as part of the larger Global warming controversy and political, social and economic Culture war in the 2020s.

The NEA continues to call on its members to act against climate change. Richard Cizik left the NEA and launched the New Evangelical Partnership for the Common Good.

Other Christian organisations continue to work in the area of global warming, including A Rocha and Operation Noah.

== See also ==
- Creation care
- Sustainability
