= Hellbound =

Hellbound or Hell Bound may refer to:

== Film and television ==
- Hell Bound (1931 film), an American film directed by Walter Lang
- Hell Bound (1957 film), an American film directed by William J. Hole Jr.
- Hellbound: Hellraiser II, a 1988 film in the Hellraiser franchise
- Hellbound (film), a 1994 film starring Chuck Norris
- Hellbound?, a 2012 Canadian documentary film
- Hellbound (TV series), a 2021 South Korean television series
- "Hell Bound" (Angel), a television episode
- "Hellbound" (The X-Files), a television episode

== Music ==
=== Albums ===
- Hellbound (Iron Angel album) or the title song, 2018
- Hellbound (Nekromantix album) or the title song, 1989
- Hellbound (Torture Squad album) or the title song, 2008
- Hellbound (Warlock album) or the title song, 1985
- Hellbound (EP) or the title song by the Living End, 1995
- One (Hellbound), by Demiricous, 2006
- Hellbound, by Fit for an Autopsy, 2013
- Hellbound, by Buckcherry, 2021

=== Songs ===
- "Hellbound" (song), by Eminem, J-Black, and Masta Ace, 2000
- "Hellbound", by the Almighty RSO from Revenge of da Badd Boyz, 1994
- "Hellbound", by the Breeders from Pod, 1990
- "Hellbound", by Converge from No Heroes, 2006
- "Hellbound", by Hopes Die Last from Wolfpack, 2013
- "Hellbound", by Jerry Cantrell from Degradation Trip Volumes 1 & 2, 2002
- "Hellbound", by Pantera from Reinventing the Steel, 2000
- "Hellbound", by Tygers of Pan Tang from Spellbound, 1981
- "Chapter X: Hellbound", by Ceremonial Oath from The Book of Truth, 1993

== Other uses ==
- Hellbound: The Blood War, an accessory for the 2nd edition of Advanced Dungeons & Dragons
- Hell Bound, a book by Francesca Gavin about New Gothic art
