= Yale Center for Environmental Law & Policy =

Yale Center for Environmental Law &
- Abbreviation: YCELP
- Formation: 1994
- Founder: Yale School of Forestry & Environmental Studies and Yale Law School
- Founded at: New Haven, Connecticut, USA
- Type: Joint initiative
- Legal status: Active
- Purpose: To advance fresh thinking and analytically rigorous approaches to environmental decision making across disciplines, sectors, and boundaries.
- Headquarters: New Haven, Connecticut, U.S.
- Origins: Joint initiative between the Yale School of Forestry & Environmental Studies and the Yale Law School 2
- Fields: Environmental law, Environmental policy
- Official language: English
- Owner: Yale University
- Director: Daniel C. Esty 3
- Parent organization: Yale University

The Yale Center for Environmental Law & Policy is a joint initiative between the Yale School of Forestry & Environmental Studies and the Yale Law School.

== Mission ==
The Yale Center for Environmental Law & Policy seeks to advance fresh thinking and analytically rigorous approaches to environmental decisionmaking – across disciplines, sectors, and boundaries.

== History ==
Established in 1994, the Yale Center for Environmental Law & Policy is a joint initiative between the Yale School of Forestry & Environmental Studies and the Yale Law School.

The Yale School of Forestry & Environmental Studies, founded in 1900 by Gifford Pinchot, the first director of the U.S. Forest Service, helped to launch the conservation and natural resource management movement in the early 1900s. The School's graduates have provided ongoing leadership in the environmental and natural resource fields, both domestically and internationally.

Graduates of Yale Law School were the prime movers behind the environmental law movement of the late 1960s and early 1970s, founding organizations such as the Environmental Defense Fund and the Natural Resources Defense Council. Yale Law School students are active in the Yale Environmental Law Association and special projects organized by the Center for Environmental Law & Policy.

== Program areas ==
- Environmental Performance Measurement - The Environmental Performance Measurement (EPM) Project aims to shift environmental decision-making onto firmer analytic foundations using environmental indicators and statistics. In collaboration with the Center for International Earth Science Information Network at Columbia University and the World Economic Forum, the project produces a periodically updated Environmental Sustainability Index (ESI) that tracks 146 countries on 21 sustainability indicators. Work is now under way on an Environmental Performance Index (EPI) that will assess key environmental policy outcomes using trend analysis and policy targets linked to the Millennium Development Goals. The 2006 Pilot EPI was released in Davos, Switzerland, at the annual meeting of the World Economic Forum on Thursday, 26 January 2006.
- Environmental Attitudes and Behavior - The Environmental Attitudes and Behavior Program strives to address the relationship between Americans’ environmental values and subsequent personal and political decisionmaking.
- Innovations and the Environment - The Innovation and Environment Program develops theory and practice at the nexus of business and the environment. The goal of this work is three-fold: To integrate environmental thinking into corporate strategy; To support the economic utility of environment-related business ventures; and To encourage environmental organizations and policymakers to be more "business-like" in their decisionmaking and management. This Program is a shared endeavor with the Center for Business and the Environment at Yale.
- Environmental Governance - The Environmental Governance Program aims to produce scholarly analysis and tools with policy application for government authorities, communities, NGO leaders, and corporate executives. Environmental governance research projects include the Global Environmental Governance Project and the UNITAR-Yale Environment and Democracy Initiative.
- Yale Environmental Protection Clinic - The Yale Environmental Protection Clinic is designed to introduce students to the fields of environmental advocacy and policymaking by exploring a variety of environmental law and policy questions and the tools environmental professionals use to address them. As a part of the program, teams of three to four students work with client organizations on "real-world" projects, with the goal of producing a major work product for the client by the end of the semester.

== People and partners ==
=== Faculty researchers and staff ===
- Daniel C. Esty, Director
- Kit Kennedy, Director, Environmental Law Clinic
- Benjamin Cashore, Affiliated Faculty, Environmental Governance
- Bradford S. Gentry, Principal Investigator, Private International Finance and the Environment Project
- Ysella Yoder, Program Manager
- Susanne Stahl, Communications Associate
- John Emerson, Affiliated Faculty, Environmental Performance Measurement
- William Dornbos, Associate Director
- Maria Ivanova, Project Director, Global Environmental Governance Project
- Anthony Leisrowitz, Affiliated Research Scientist, Environmental Attitudes and Behavior

=== Faculty advisors ===
- Mark Ashton, Professor of Silviculture & Forest Ecology, School of Forestry & Environmental Studies
- Robert Bailis, Assistant Professor of Environmental Social Science, School of Forestry & Environmental Studies
- Michelle Bell, Assistant Professor of Environmental Health, School of Forestry & Environmental Studies, Chemical Engineering
- Gaboury Benoit, Professor of Environmental Chemistry, School of Forestry & Environmental Studies; Professor of Environmental Engineering
- Jonathan Borak, Associate Clinical Professor of Medicine and Public Health Director, Yale Interdisciplinary Risk Assessment Forum
- Marian Chertow, Assistant Professor of Industrial Environmental Management, School of Forestry & Environmental Studies
- William Ellis, Senior Visiting Fellow, School of Forestry & Environmental Studies
- Thomas Graedel, Clifton R. Musser Professor of Industrial Ecology, School of Forestry & Environmental Studies; Professor of Chemical Engineering; Professor of Geology and Geophysics
- Arnulf Grübler, Professor of Field of Energy and Technology, School of Forestry & Environmental Studies
- Dan Kahan, Elizabeth K. Dollard Professor of Law at Yale Law School
- Doug Kysar, Professor of Law, Yale University
- Xuhui Lee, Professor of Forestry and Biometeorology, School of Forestry & Environmental Studies
- Reid Lifset, Associate Director of the Industrial Environmental Management Program and Editor of the Journal of Industrial Ecology, School of Forestry & Environmental Studies
- Erin Mansur, Assistant Professor of Environmental Economics, School of Forestry & Environmental Studies and School of Management
- Robert Mendelsohn, Edwin Weyerhaeuser Davis Professor of Forest Policy and Economics, School of Forestry & Environmental Studies and School of Management
- Sheila Olmstead, Assistant Professor of Environmental Economics, School of Forestry & Environmental Studies
- Peter Raymond, Assistant Professor, School of Forestry & Environmental Studies
- Oswald Schmitz, Professor of Population and Community Ecology, School of Forestry & Environmental Studies; Professor of Ecology and Evolutionary Biology
- David Skelly, Professor of Ecology, School of Forestry & Environmental Studies; Professor of Ecology and Evolutionary Biology
- Gus Speth, Dean and Professor in the Practice of Sustainable Development, School of Forestry & Environmental Studies
- Simon Tay, Visiting Associate Professor, School of Forestry & Environmental Studies
- John Wargo, Professor of Environmental Risk Analysis and Policy, School of Forestry & Environmental Studies

=== Research affiliates ===
- Sybil Ackerman, Executive Director, The Lazar Foundation
- Monica Araya, Office of the Vice Chairman at Climate Change Capital
- James Cameron, Vice Chairman, Climate Change Capital
- Emil Frankel, Director of Transportation Policy, Bipartisan Policy Center
- Achim Alexander Halpaap, M.Ph, MA Director, Unitar/Yale Environment and Democracy Project
- Harri Kalimo, Professor, Institute for European Studies
- Sascha Mueller-Kraenner, Vice-Chairman, Ecologic Institute
- Tanja Srebotnjak, Senior Fellow, Ecologic Institute
- Andrew Winston, Founder, Winston Eco-Strategies

=== Partners ===
- Center for International Earth Science Information Network, Columbia University
- The College of William and Mary
- Renewable Energy and International Law Project
- United Nations Institute for Training and Research
- Vermont Law School
- Yale Center for Business and the Environment
- Yale Center for the Study of Globalization
- Yale Project on Climate Change Communication
