= Energy Future Coalition =

- Formation: 2001
- Headquarters: 1615 M Street NW, Suite 700, Washington, DC, USA
- Website: energyfuturecoalition.org

The Energy Future Coalition is a nonpartisan public policy initiative that seeks to speed the transition to a new energy economy. The Coalition brings together business, labor, and environmental groups to identify new directions in energy policy with broad political support.

The Energy Future Coalition works closely with the United Nations Foundation, with which it is co-located, on energy and climate policy, especially energy access, energy efficiency, and bioenergy issues.

== Steering Committee ==
- Frances Beinecke, President, Natural Resources Defense Council
- Richard Branson, Chairman, The Virgin Group
- Rev. Richard Cizik, Principal, The New Evangelical Partnership for the Common Good
- Charles B. Curtis, Deputy Secretary of Energy under President Bill Clinton; Chairman, Federal Energy Regulatory Commission under President Jimmy Carter; President, Nuclear Threat Initiative
- Tom Daschle, Senior Policy Advisor, DLA Piper; Distinguished Senior Fellow, Center for American Progress; former U.S. Senator from South Dakota and Senate Majority Leader
- Scott DeFife, Executive Vice President, Policy and Government Affairs, National Restaurant Association
- Susan Eisenhower, President, Eisenhower Group; Chair Emeritus, The Eisenhower Institute
- Vic Fazio, Senior Advisor, Akin Gump Strauss Hauer & Feld; former Member of Congress
- Maggie Fox, CEO and President, Alliance for Climate Protection
- Michael V. Finley, President, Turner Foundation
- Robert W. Fri, Deputy Administrator of the U.S. Environmental Protection Agency under President Richard Nixon and of the Energy Research and Development Administration under President Gerald Ford; Visiting Scholar and former President, Resources for the Future
- C. Boyden Gray, Founder, Boyden Gray & Associates; U.S. Ambassador to the European Union under President George W. Bush; White House Counsel under President George H. W. Bush
- Andy Karsner, CEO and Founder, Manifest Energy, LLC; Assistant Secretary of Energy for Energy Efficiency and Renewable Energy under President George W. Bush
- Suedeen Kelly, Partner, Patton Boggs; Former Commissioner, Federal Energy Regulatory Commission
- Vinod Khosla, Partner, Khosla Ventures
- Thea Mei Lee, Deputy Chief of Staff, AFL-CIO
- Thomas E. Lovejoy, Biodiversity Chair, The H. John Heinz III Center for Science, Economics and the Environment; Former Chief Scientist and Counselor, Smithsonian Institution
- Vice Admiral Dennis V. McGinn, President, American Council on Renewable Energy (ACORE)
- John D. Podesta, Chair and Counselor, Center for American Progress; White House Chief of Staff under President Bill Clinton
- Stephanie Herseth Sandlin, Principal Attorney, Olsson Frank Weeda Terman Bode Matz PC; former Member of Congress
- Larry Schweiger, President and CEO, National Wildlife Federation
- Steve Symms, Partner, Parry, Romani, DeConcini & Symms; former U.S. Senator from Idaho
- Ted Turner, Chairman, United Nations Foundation, Turner Foundation, and Nuclear Threat Initiative; Chairman, Turner Enterprises
- Timothy E. Wirth, President, United Nations Foundation; former U.S. Senator from Colorado; Under Secretary of State for Global Affairs under President Bill Clinton

== History ==
In late 2001, with the support of the Turner Foundation and Better World Fund, the Energy Future Coalition held exploratory meetings to discuss the inadequacies in U.S. energy policy. These meetings were focused on addressing our dependence on foreign oil and the associated risk to our economy and national security, the neglected threat of climate change, and the need to bring electricity and modern fuels to the two billion people who lack them.

A consensus emerged on the need for change, and on the opportunity to present a new vision that linked security, environment, and economics for a more sustainable future. Over the next six months, more than 150 individuals from business, labor, government, academia, and the NGO community came together to create a compelling new vision of what the energy economy could become, and to identify policy changes that would spark a revolution in energy technology.

The Coalition focused on practical political coalition building, aimed at breaking the gridlock along partisan lines that had previously prevented substantive advances in energy policy. The Coalition created six Working Groups of diverse participants that participated in a nine-month effort to identify a new path forward. These working groups presented recommendations in the areas of transportation, bioenergy and agriculture, the future of coal, end-use efficiency, the smart grid, and innovative financing for international energy development.

Elements of the Coalition's recommendations were included in the Energy Policy Act of 2005 (EPAct 2005).

Building on the Coalition's Bioenergy and Agriculture Working Group, a group of agriculture and forestry leaders developed the 25x'25 vision, which states that America should produce 25% of its energy from renewable resources by 2025. In the Energy Independence and Security Act of 2007 Congress endorsed 25x'25 as a goal for the nation.
