= The Myth of a Christian Nation =

2007 book by Greg Boyd

The Myth of a Christian Nation: How the Quest for Political Power is Destroying the Church
- Author: Greg Boyd
- Language: English
- Publisher: Zondervan
- Publication place: United States
- Pages: 208
- ISBN: 0310267307

The Myth of a Christian Nation: How the Quest for Political Power is Destroying the Church is a 2007 book by theologian Greg Boyd on the relationship between politics and Christianity. Following the book's release, Boyd, who was already a noteworthy theologian before the book's publication, gained national attention after the New York Times published a front page cover article on the book and Boyd's rejection of the religious right. He also discussed the book on The Charlie Rose Show and in the CNN documentary God's Warriors. The book was also discussed widely in publications such as Christianity Today and The Christian Century.

== Background and summary ==
Boyd wrote the book in the wake of pressure he felt as a senior pastor to endorse George W. Bush and other conservative candidates, as well as other conservative causes, from the pulpit. During the 2004 United States Presidential Election year, many Christian evangelicals publicly supported the reelection of George W. Bush, and ended up playing a major role in his re-election.

As early as the 1990s, Boyd had become seriously concerned about the politicization of Christianity in North America. Boyd was especially disturbed by the way in which Evangelical Christians had come to align themselves with right-wing politics and the Republican Party. Instead of endorsing Bush for president, he delivered a sermon series entitled "The Cross and the Sword" calling on Christians to take a more humble approach toward politics, arguing instead that Christians should be careful not to align themselves with any particular political ideology, party, or candidate and should instead focus on following Jesus and embodying the values he taught. Boyd then authored Myth of a Christian Nation to further explicate his views on the subject.

Boyd's book challenges the theology of the Christian right and the theory of American exceptionalism, as well the claim that America is a "Christian Nation". He instead argues that America is flawed and imperfect just like any other nation, and that the United States mirrors all other nations, or "kingdoms of the world" as the book calls them. He then contrasts the ethics and foundations of the "kingdoms of the world" with Jesus' teaching of the kingdom of God. Boyd argues that Christians owe their full allegiance to the Kingdom of God and must reject the coercive, violent, and unjust methods and means used by the kingdoms of the world. Christians, he believes, have no duty to "Take America Back for God" or to even be involved in the political sphere, and should not use politics as a means of transforming society. Boyd's next book, The Myth of the Christian Religion: Losing Your Life for the Beauty of a Revolution, expands on many of the themes and topics discussed in The Myth of a Christian Nation.

== Popular culture ==
Josh Dies, vocalist of the band Showbread, is a fan of Boyd and referenced the book in a song with the same title.
