= Greg Boyd =

American pastor and theologian (born 1957)

Gregory A. Boyd
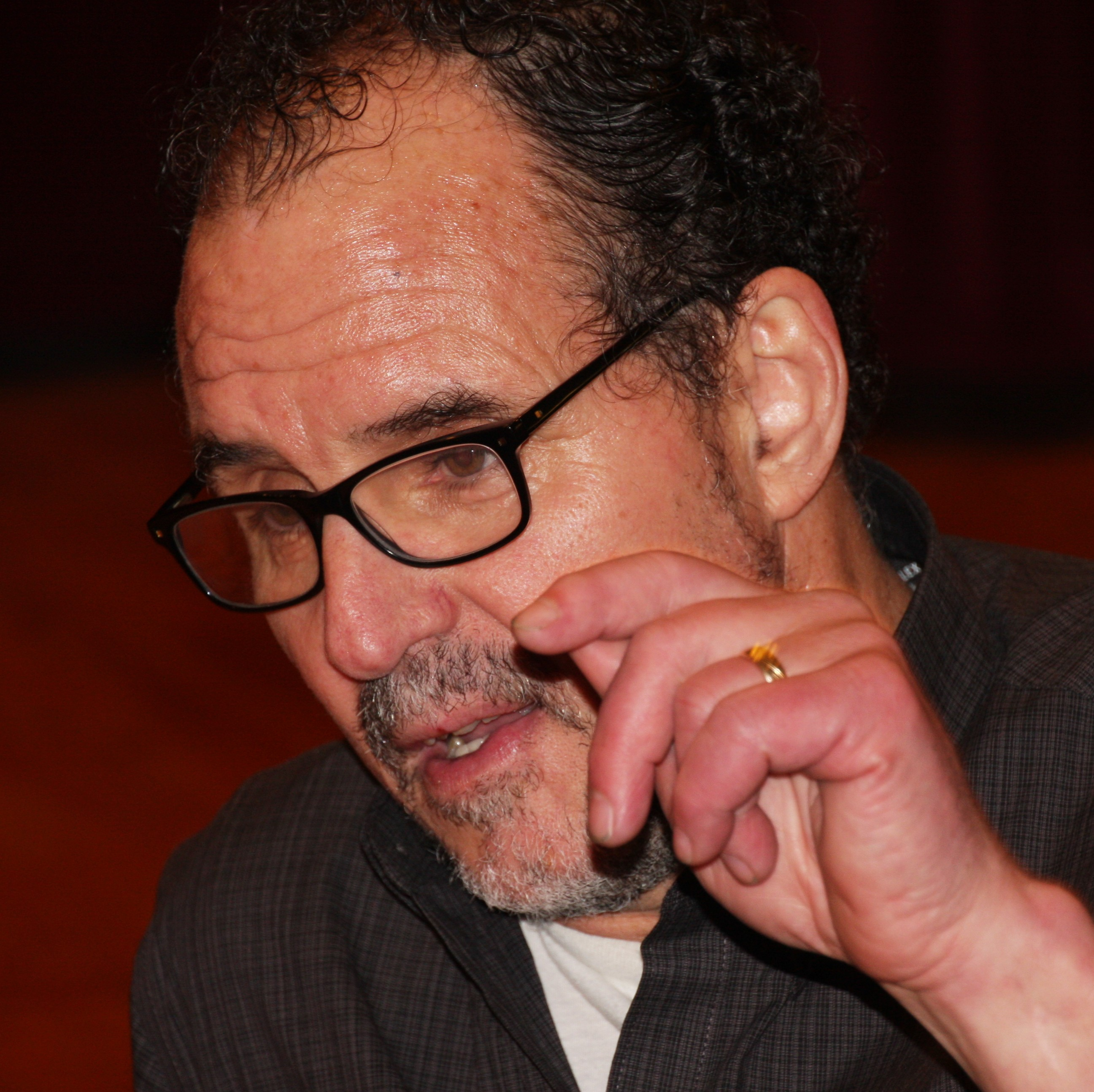
- Boyd in 2017
- Born: June 2, 1957 (age 69)
- Education: University of Minnesota (BA); Yale Divinity School (MDiv); Princeton Theological Seminary (PhD)
- Occupations: Theologian; pastor; author
- Spouse: Shelley Boyd
- Website: reknew.org

Gregory A. Boyd (born June 2, 1957) is an American theologian, Anabaptist pastor, and author. Boyd is Senior Pastor of Woodland Hills Church in St. Paul, Minnesota, and President of Reknew.org. He is one of the leading spokesmen in the growing Neo-Anabaptism movement, which is based in the tradition of Anabaptism and advocates Christian pacifism and a non-violent understanding of God.

Boyd has also long been known as a leading advocate of open theism. In addition, he is known for his writings on the relationship between Christianity and politics, including his best-selling book The Myth of a Christian Nation, which was written after The New York Times published a front-page cover article on Boyd's criticism of the Christian right. In 2010, Boyd was listed as one of the twenty most influential living Christian scholars. In addition to The New York Times, Boyd has also made appearances on CNN, NPR, the BBC, and The Charlie Rose Show.

== Early life, education, and teaching career ==
Boyd was raised as a Roman Catholic but became an atheist as a teenager. In 1974, at the age of 16, he converted to Oneness Pentecostalism, but later began questioning the movement's teachings. Finally, in late 1979, he became an orthodox Christian.

After earning a bachelor's degree in philosophy from the University of Minnesota, he attended Yale Divinity School, graduating cum laude with a Master of Divinity degree in 1982. He then attended Princeton Theological Seminary, earning a PhD in 1987, graduating magna cum laude. While at Princeton he was a classmate of Bart Ehrman and a student of Bruce Metzger. Boyd was then Professor of Theology at Bethel University for sixteen years. He resigned after there was a dispute between himself and some of the professors there over his open theism advocacy. Greg Boyd now teaches at Bethel University on an adjunct basis. In 1992 Boyd co-founded Woodland Hills Church.

== Thought ==
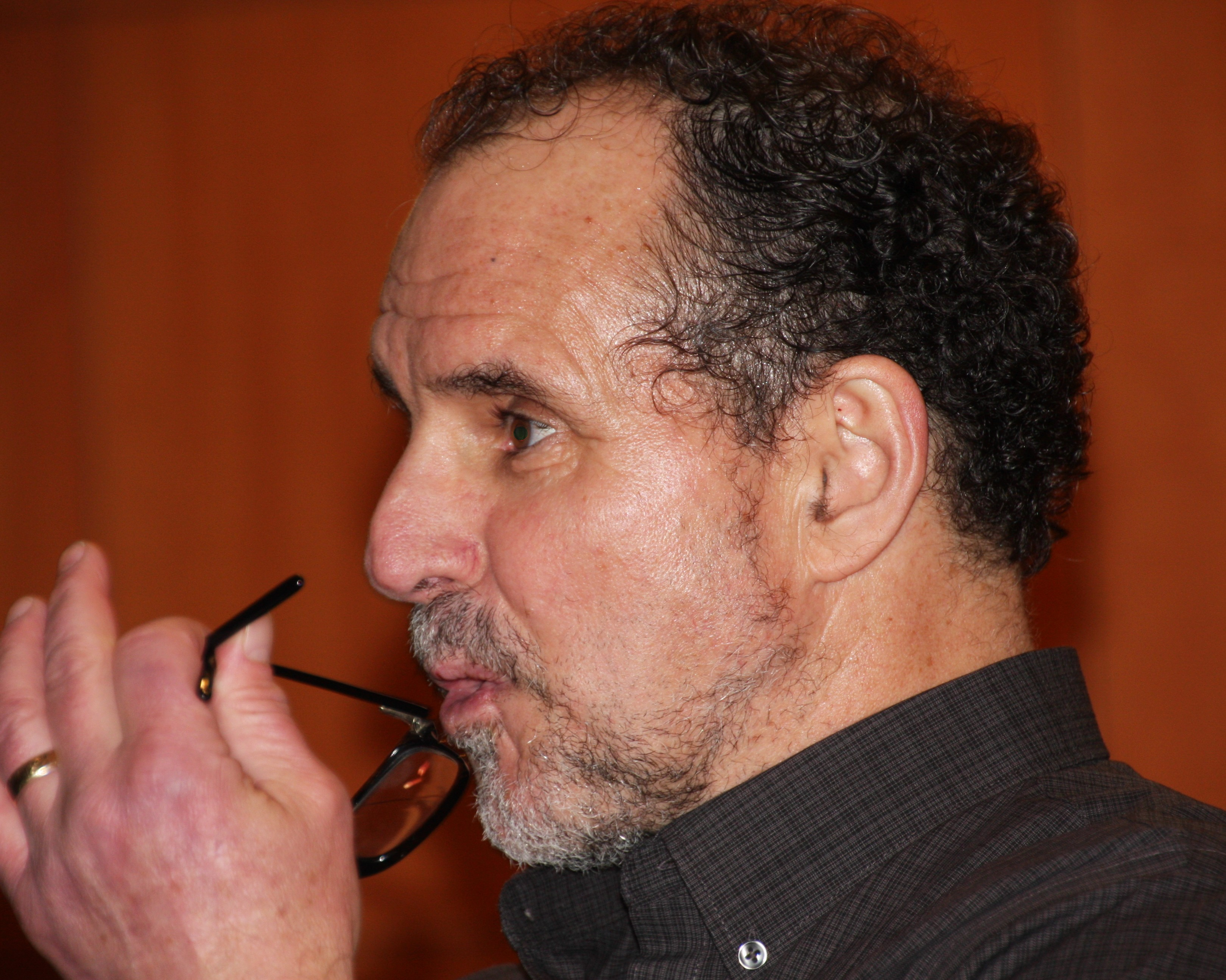
Greg Boyd

Boyd's Princeton dissertation (published as Trinity and Process) was a critique of the process theology of Charles Hartshorne. Here, he attempts to construct a philosophical theology that retains the positive features of a process worldview, while avoiding its unorthodox implications. Boyd is also a former Oneness Pentecostal, and wrote the book Oneness Pentecostals and the Trinity (1992), critiquing the movement's anti-trinitarian view of God and other doctrines.

Boyd is also known as one of the leading supporters of open theism, which he explores in the book God of the Possible (2000). In essence, open theism is the view that the future is partly open, and therefore known to God partly as a realm of possibilities. Proponents of the conservative or traditional view of God within the Baptist General Conference, such as John Piper, tried unsuccessfully to have the rules of the denomination changed to exclude Boyd and other open theists.

He is widely known for his 1994 book, Letters from a Skeptic, a collection of letters written by Boyd and his father Edward, who was an atheist at the time. Through the course of their correspondence, Boyd addressed many of the perennial intellectual challenges to the Christian faith, which led to his father's conversion.

Boyd was featured in a front-page New York Times profile in July 2006 after losing 20% of his congregation, which Boyd attributed to his refusal to lend his public support to conservative political causes and his claim that American evangelical Christianity was too politicized. In his view, the Kingdom of God always looks like Jesus, whom Boyd describes as not seeking to maintain control or power over others, but instead self-sacrificially serving and loving them. Therefore, according to Boyd, the gospel cannot be associated with any particular political or nationalistic ideology. The congregational loss came after his 2004 sermon series called "The Cross and the Sword." As a result of the sermon series he authored the book The Myth of a Christian Nation: How the Quest for Political Power Is Destroying the Church (2006), in which he argues that a commitment to non-violence and to loving one's enemies lies at the heart of the teachings of Jesus. Boyd further discussed these views in the CNN documentary God's Warriors, which aired in August 2007. In a more recent book, The Myth of a Christian Religion: Losing Your Religion for the Beauty of a Revolution (2009), he presents his understanding of what the Kingdom of God is.

In 2012 Woodland Hills Church began exploring Anabaptism and the possibility of affiliating with Mennonite Church USA and the Brethren in Christ. Boyd stated that "we've really been kind of growing in this direction since the church started, without knowing what Anabaptism was." During the exploration, leadership asked the congregation to read Stuart Murray's The Naked Anabaptist, and the church has met with Anabaptist groups.

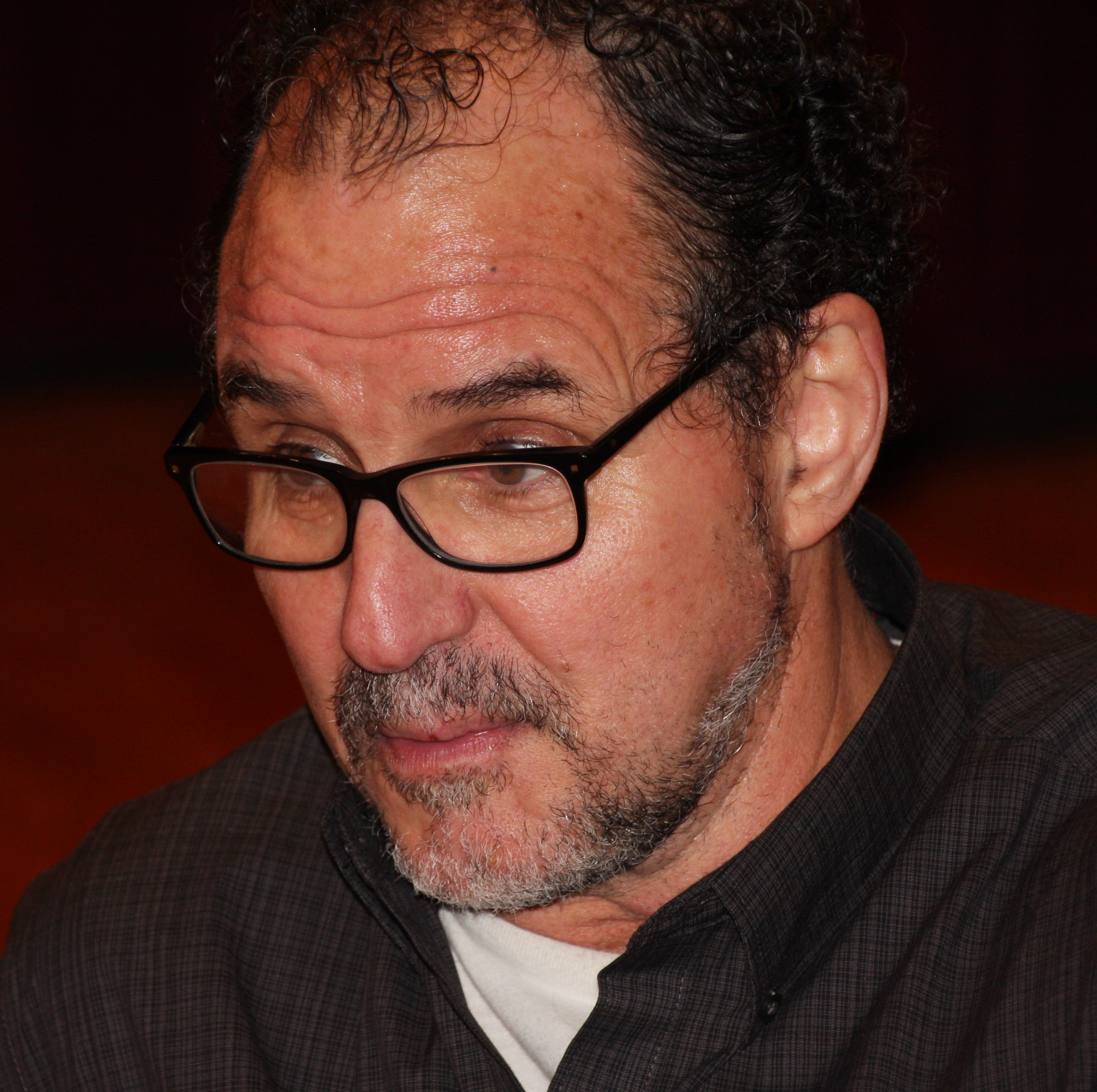
Boyd in 2017

He is also a notable figure in New Testament scholarship and the Quest for the Historical Jesus. He is critical of liberal scholarship as typified by the Jesus Seminar as well as the individual work of scholars like John Dominic Crossan and Burton Mack. He has participated in numerous public debates, most notably with friend Robert M. Price and Dan Barker on the historicity of the New Testament and related matters. His first book in this area was Cynic Sage or Son of God? (1995). More recently, his book (co-authored with Paul Rhodes Eddy), The Jesus Legend: A Case for the Historical Reliability of the Synoptic Jesus Tradition (2007) won the 2008 Christianity Today Book of the Year Award (Biblical Studies category).

He has written on, and advocates for, the doctrine of Christian conditionalism or annihilationism. He was also one of the most prominent supporters of Rob Bell's controversial book Love Wins, offering an endorsement on the back of the book. Boyd appears in the 2012 documentary film Hellbound, encouraging Christians to have a more open mind about heaven, hell, and salvation.

Boyd is also a contributor to the BioLogos Foundation and has written extensively about reconciling Christianity and evolution.

=== God at War ===
Main article: God at War

Boyd has argued that if we assume that the Christian God is not absolutely all-powerful, it becomes logical that he is all-good. In his book God at War, he elaborates on this God. Boyd contends that God is at war and sometimes fails, which explains outcomes that are calamitous for humans.

Boyd is known for his academic work on the topics of Satan, the problem of evil, spiritual warfare, and the demonic. He is authoring a series of books, titled Satan and Evil (produced by InterVarsity Press), two volumes of which have already been published: God at War: The Bible and Spiritual Conflict (1997) and Satan and the Problem of Evil: Constructing a Trinitarian Warfare Theodicy (2001). In between numerous other projects, he has been at work on the next installment of this series, tentatively titled The Myth of the Blueprint, which is now planned as a two-volume work with roughly 1,000 pages to each volume. Boyd is also a contributor to the 2012 book Understanding Spiritual Warfare: Four Views (eds. J. Beilby and P. R. Eddy, Baker Academic). Related to this, Boyd supports the Christus Victor model of the atonement.

== Personal life ==
Boyd is a vegetarian and plays the drums. Boyd has grown children with his wife, Shelley, to whom he has been married for over thirty years.

== Books ==
- Trinity and Process: A Critical Evaluation and Reconstruction of Hartshorne's Di-Polar Theism Towards a Trinitarian Metaphysics (1992) ISBN 0-8204-1660-6
- Oneness Pentecostals and the Trinity (1992) ISBN 0-8010-1019-5
- Cynic Sage or Son of God? (1995) ISBN 0-8010-2118-9
- Jesus Under Siege (1995) ISBN 1-56476-533-4
- Letters From a Skeptic: A Son Wrestles with His Father's Questions about Christianity (1994); reprint edition, 2008 ISBN 1-56476-244-0
- God at War: The Bible and Spiritual Conflict (1997) ISBN 0-8308-1885-5
- God of the Possible: A Biblical Introduction to the Open View of God (2000) ISBN 0-8010-6290-X
- Satan & the Problem of Evil: Constructing a Trinitarian Warfare Theodicy (2001) ISBN 0-8308-1550-3
- Across the Spectrum: Understanding Issues in Evangelical Theology (with Paul Rhodes Eddy) (2002) ISBN 0-8010-2276-2
- Is God to Blame?: Moving Beyond Pat Answers to the Problem of Evil (2003) ISBN 0-8308-2394-8
- Seeing Is Believing: Experience Jesus Through Imaginative Prayer (2004) ISBN 0-8010-6502-X
- Repenting of Religion: Turning from Judgment to the Love of God (2004) ISBN 0-8010-6506-2
- Escaping The Matrix: Setting Your Mind Free To Experience Real Life In Christ (with Al Larson) (2005) ISBN 0-8010-6533-X
- The Myth of a Christian Nation: How the Quest for Political Power Is Destroying the Church (2006) ISBN 0-310-26730-7
- The Jesus Legend: A Case for the Historical Reliability of the Synoptic Jesus Tradition (with Paul Rhodes Eddy) (2007) ISBN 0-8010-3114-1
- Lord or Legend?: Wrestling with the Jesus Dilemma (with Paul Rhodes Eddy) (2007) ISBN 0-8010-6505-4
- The Myth of a Christian Religion: Losing Your Religion for the Beauty of a Revolution (2009) ISBN 0-310-28383-3
- Present Perfect: Finding God in the Now (2010) ISBN 0-310-28384-1
- Benefit of the Doubt: Breaking the Idol of Certainty (2013) ISBN 0801014921
- The Crucifixion of the Warrior God: Volumes 1 & 2 (2017) ISBN 1-506-42075-3
- Cross Vision: How the Crucifixion of Jesus Makes Sense of Old Testament Violence (2017) ISBN 978-1-5064-2073-8
- Inspired Imperfection: How the Bible's Problems Enhance Its Divine Authority (2020) ISBN 978-1-5064-5562-4
