= Matthew Sleeth (Christian environmentalist) =

American environmentalist and writer

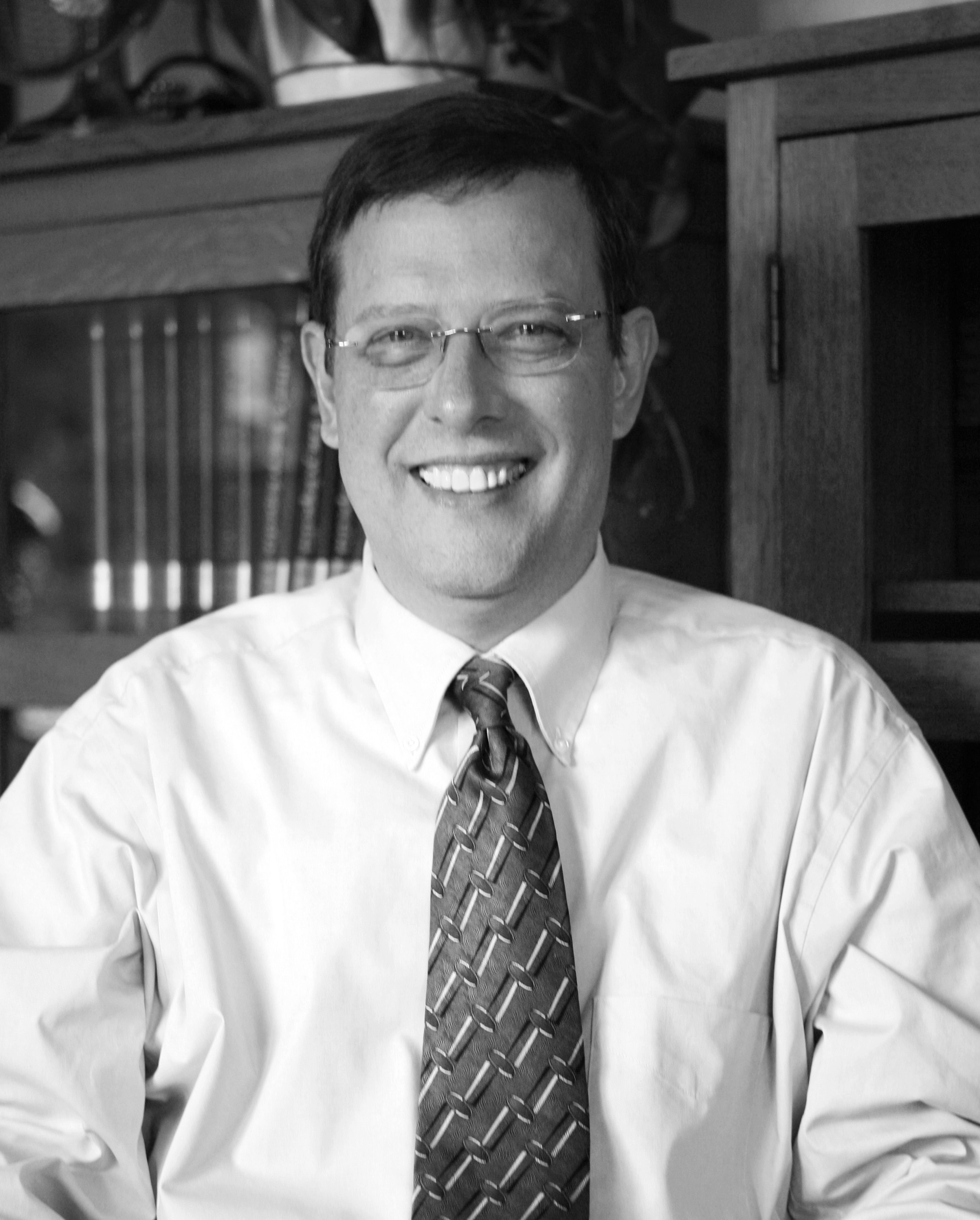
- Born: October 6, 1956 (age 69)
- Occupations: Doctor, author

Matthew Sleeth is an American author and advocate of creation care. A former emergency department physician, Sleeth wrote his first book, Serve God, Save the Planet (Zondervan), in May 2006. Since then, he has spoken more than 900 times in churches, schools and to media outlets about the biblical mandate to care for the Earth.

In 2008, Sleeth wrote the introduction to The Green Bible (HarperOne) and in 2010 wrote The Gospel According to the Earth: Why the Good Book is a Green Book (HarperOne). His third book, 24/6: A Prescription for a Healthier, Happier Life was released in November 2012 (Tyndale House Publishers). Through his nonprofit, Blessed Earth, Sleeth wrote and released a 12-part creation care DVD series called Serving God, Saving the Planet (Zondervan), with accompanying guidebooks, in 2010.

His book Reforesting Faith: What Trees Teach Us About the Nature of God and His Love for Us was published by WaterBrook/Penguin Random House April 16, 2019.

== Education ==
Sleeth attended West Virginia University in Morgantown, West Virginia, for his undergraduate degree and earned his MD degree from The George Washington University School of Medicine. In 2016, he was awarded an honorary Doctorate by Hood Theological Seminary.

=== Press ===
Sleeth has been featured in publications such as Newsweek, Christianity Today, Books and Culture, Creation Care Magazine, Guideposts, The Huffington Post, San Francisco Chronicle, Grist, and films such as The Great Warming and Start: Becoming a Good Samaritan. Sleeth wrote the introduction for and served on the advisory board of The Green Bible (HarperOne).

=== Nonprofit ===
In 2008, Sleeth and his wife, Nancy Sleeth, founded Blessed Earth, an educational nonprofit.
