= God at War =

God at War: The Bible & Spiritual Conflict is a 1997 book-length work of theology from Gregory Boyd, an American anabaptist pastor. Boyd's central concern is the problem of evil. He contends that God is at war with demons and has been since at least the emergence of the simplest human mythologies. This explains outcomes that are calamitous for humans but suggests a wider time horizon for God's of gift of peace and justice.
