= The Green Bible =

English study Bible with focus on environmental issues

- Cover
- Author: various
- Subject: Religion, environmentalism
- Publisher: Harper Bibles
- Publication date: 2008
- ISBN: 978-0-06-162799-6
- OCLC: 227199080

The Green Bible is an English version of the New Revised Standard Version Bible with a focus on environmental issues and teachings. It was originally published by Harper Bibles on October 7, 2008. It is a study Bible featuring a foreword by Desmond Tutu and essays by Matthew Sleeth, Calvin B. DeWitt, Pope John Paul II, Brian McLaren, Ellen Bernstein, Ellen F. Davis, James Jones, N.T. Wright, Barbara Brown Taylor, and Gordon Aeschliman.

== Background ==
The Green Bible is meant to "equip and encourage [readers] to see God's vision for creation and help [them] engage in the work of healing and sustaining it". Emphasizing what the publishers see as the Bible’s message on the environment, all passages mentioning the environment are printed in green ink to draw the reader’s attention.

== Inspiration ==
Mark Tauber, senior vice-president of HarperOne, has stated that the Green Bible was developed with the intention of being "the first ever specialty bible that takes the issues of sustainability, stewardship of the earth, what many in the religious community call 'creation care' very seriously". He went further, exposing on the Green Bible’s purpose: "That the Bible has a profound message of sustainability—some might argue, the original message—is not all that surprising. What is surprising is that it is not one of the first things that comes to mind when most folks think about the Bible and its message. This Bible seeks to change that fact. We believe that the unique and specially added features by some of today's most important thinkers, writers and leaders, across the ecumenical spectrum make it a must-have for those who already find motivation, comfort and inspiration in it and for the many more who might see it freshly as a critical resource in their journey to sustain our planet".

HarperOne also claims the Bible contains more references to the environment than it does about love or most other subjects.

== Construction ==
The Green Bible is meant to be a study bible, and features a "green trail study guide" of the Bible, directing readers to specific verses on the environment and stewardship. Additionally, it features a topical index for finding verses pertaining to specific subjects. Before the biblical text, the Green Bible provides an introduction from Archbishop Desmond Tutu and essays from Brian McLaren, Cal DeWitt, Barbara Brown Taylor, Pope John Paul II, Ellen F. Davis, N. T. Wright, Ellen Bernstein, Matthew Sleeth, James Jones, and Gordon Aeschliman. Verses involving the environment or the earth are highlighted in green to draw reader’s attention.

Notable theologians including Archbishop Desmond Tutu and conservative N.T. Wright contributed material to the edition’s supplemental reading. To further support the green cause, HarperCollins printed the Green Bible on recycled paper, used soy-based ink, and made the cover from renewable cotton linen.

== Reception ==
The Sierra Club, The Humane Society, and the Eco-Justice Program have all officially endorsed the Green Bible. Reaction to the Green Bible among Christian leaders has been mixed. Some leaders have praised the concept of the Green Bible, but have raised issues with how some content is presented, stating that the environmental message deemphasizes the Bible’s central message of the Gospels. Richard Land, head of the Southern Baptist Convention’s Ethics & Religious Liberty Commission said about the edition: "Sure it's important, but when they asked Jesus what was most important, he said, 'Love your God, and love your neighbor as yourself.' He didn't say anything about creation".

Evangelist Matthew Sleeth stated that the Green Bible may help bridge the gap between liberal and conservative Christians.

Larry Schweiger, President of the National Wildlife Federation praised the Green Bible for giving "solid context" for environmentalism. In contrast, some conservatives, like talk show host Pat Gray, accused the Green Bible of merely being a marketing gimmick and money-making scheme for HarperCollins.

== See also ==
- Evangelical environmentalism
- Red letter edition
