= Chernow =

Chernow is a surname. Notable persons with this name include:

- Ann Chernow (born 1936), American artist
- Barbara Chernow, American academic administrator
- Ron Chernow (born 1949), American writer, journalist, historian, and biographer
- Admiral Chernow of Designated Survivor (TV series)
- Michael Chernow, American, executive chef of The Meatball Shop
