= Sleeth =

Sleeth may refer to:

- Sleeth (surname), people with the surname

== See also ==
- Sleeth Site, an archaeological site in Illinois
