= CNN Presents =

American documentary program

- Starring: Varies
- Country of origin: United States

Production
- Running time: 60 minutes

Original release
- Network: CNN
- Release: March 1993 – 2012

CNN Presents is an American documentary program on CNN weekends. The program used to be replaced with CNN Special Investigations Unit, which features the same documentary format, but differs from it in a number of ways and is shorter in length.

The program was originally a regular weekly series that looks in-depth in the important news stories of the times. More recently, it became a "special event" documentary that airs every time a larger, more long-term special report went into making. Notably, the program has been a winner of a number of different awards, including the International Documentary Association Best Documentary Series award.

Previous to his departure from CNN, Presents was hosted and narrated by Aaron Brown.

CNN Presents has been revived since its presentation of God's Warriors by Christiane Amanpour in August 2007, and later with Planet in Peril, Black in America, and Latino in America, all of which have received follow-up documentaries later on.

In July 2011, the format of CNN Presents changed to a series of three investigative reports aired together in a one-hour documentary, instead of a documentary about a single topic.
