= Matthew Sleeth =

Matthew Sleeth may refer to:

- Matthew Sleeth (visual artist) (born 1972), Australian contemporary visual artist
- Matthew Sleeth (Christian environmentalist), author, speaker, and advocate of creation care
