= CNN Special Investigations Unit =

- The titlecard for CNN S.I.U.
- Starring: Varies
- Country of origin: United States

Production
- Running time: 60 minutes

Original release
- Network: CNN
- Release: January 20, 2007

CNN Special Investigations Unit is an American investigative documentary program on CNN weekends.

Expanding upon CNN Presents, SIU focuses on each episode being an in depth investigative report about news stories being covered, commonly featuring a number of interviews with experts on the issue and people who have witnessed the story taking place. The reports are commonly long-form, allowing for the network to cover more information and perspectives than would be available during a 5-minute report on another CNN program, such as CNN Newsroom.

Compared to Presents, the show has taken a slightly larger point of the reporting being done by CNN reporters, the first commercials promoting the program largely showing pictures of anchors and reporters on locations, asking questions to people on the locations. In addition, the look and feel of the show has changed somewhat drastically, adding more emphasis on the graphics used to present the program itself, in addition to the stories being covered. In addition, presentations on SIU are shorter in length than on Presents, which is now used as a special event for larger special reports that take place on a long-term basis.

Since the program's introduction, the network has slowly shifted towards relabeling past Presents presentations into SIU formatted ones, changing the graphics to reflect the new general label given to long-form reporting done by the network.

CNN Special Investigations Unit has been hosted by chief international correspondent Christiane Amanpour, anchors Anderson Cooper, John Roberts, and Soledad O'Brien, chief medical correspondent Dr. Sanjay Gupta, correspondents John King, Candy Crowley, Abbie Boudreau, Drew Griffin and others.
