= Frances Beinecke =

American activist

- Born: August 2, 1949 (age 77)
- Education: Yale University (BS, MS)
- Awards: Rachel Carson Award

Frances G. Beinecke (born August 2, 1949) is an environmental activist. She was the president of the Natural Resources Defense Council from 2006 to 2015.

== Early life and education ==
Beinecke is the youngest of four children born to William Sperry Beinecke and Elizabeth Beinecke. She was born in New Jersey.

She received a bachelor's degree from Yale College in 1971 and a master's degree from the Yale School of Forestry and Environmental Studies in 1974.

== Career ==
Beinecke first joined the Natural Resources Defense Council in 1973 as an intern. In 2006, she was nominated as president of the organization, only the second person to ever hold the position. She had previously been their executive director for eight years.

She was appointed by President Barack Obama to the National Commission on the BP Deepwater Horizon Oil Spill and Offshore Drilling in 2010.

She is on the boards of the World Resources Institute, the Energy Future Coalition, Cary Institute of Ecosystem Studies, the Nicholas Institute for Environmental Policy Solutions, the Nature Conservancy, and Conservation International's Center for Environmental Leadership in Business. She previously wason the boards of the Wilderness Society, the China-U.S. Center for Sustainable Development, and the New York League of Conservation Voters.

== Personal life ==
Beinecke married Paul Elston in 1977. They have three children.

Former classmate and actress Sigourney Weaver has stated that she uses Beinecke as inspiration when she plays a strong female character.

== Awards and honors ==
In 1990, The Wilderness Society awarded Beinecke the Robert Marshall Award, their highest award presented to a private citizen who has never held federal office.

The National Audubon Society awarded Reinecke in 2007 the prestigious Rachel Carson Award, a premier award honoring distinguished American women environmentalists, and in 2017 the Audubon Medal.

She was one of five alumni to be awarded Yale's prestigious Yale Medal for outstanding individual service to the university.

Lehman College presented Beinecke with an honorary degree in 2013.

== Works ==
- Clean Energy Common Sense: An American Call To Action On Global Climate Change, with Bob Deans, Rowman & Littlefield, 2010, ISBN 978-1-4422-0317-4, OCLC 460060057
- The World We Create: A Message of Hope for a Planet in Peril. Rowman & Littlefield. 2014. ISBN 978-1442236370.
