= Nancy Sleeth =

American environmentalist and writer

Nancy Sleeth is a Christian environmentalist, author, and Managing Director of the non-profit Blessed Earth. Her works include Go Green, Save Green: A Simple Guide to Saving Time, Money, and God’s Green Earth (Tyndale, 2009) and Almost Amish: One Woman’s Quest for a Slower, Simpler, More Sustainable Life (Tyndale, 2012). Nancy is married to Matthew Sleeth and has two children.

== Bibliography ==
- Go Green, Save Green: A Simple Guide to Saving Time, Money, and God’s Green Earth (2009)
- Almost Amish (2012)
