= New Evangelical Partnership for the Common Good =

- Formation: 2010
- Leader: Richard Cizik

The New Evangelical Partnership for the Common Good (NEP) is an Evangelical faith-based nonprofit group that offers a renewed Christian public witness for the sake of the Gospel and the common good.

== History ==
NEP was founded in 2010 by Richard Cizik, the former Vice President of Governmental Affairs at the National Association of Evangelicals; David P. Gushee, professor of Christian Ethics at Mercer University; and Steven D. Martin, a pastor and documentary filmmaker.

=== Board members ===
- Lisa Sharon Harper, NY Faith & Justice
- Rev. Dr. Cheryl Bridges Johns, Church of God Theological Seminary
- Katie Paris, Faith in Public Life
- Rev. Gabriel Salguero, The Lamb's Church
- Dr. Glen Harold Stassen, Fuller Theological Seminary
