= Hellbound? =

- Directed by: Kevin Miller
- Written by: Kevin Miller
- Produced by: Kevin Miller; David Rempel
- Edited by: Simon Tondeur
- Music by: Marcus Zuhr
- Release date: 12 September 2012 (United States)
- Country: Canada
- Language: English

Hellbound? is a 2012 Canadian documentary film which details the debate regarding various views about the existence and nature of hell.

== Premise ==
The film features interviews of theologians and commentators who discuss various views whether Hell exists and if so, who would go there after death.

Interview subjects include:

- Glen Benton
- Mike Bickle
- Gregory A. Boyd
- Ray Comfort
- Ron Dart
- Mark Driscoll
- Hank Hanegraaff
- Peter Kreeft
- Bob Larson
- Robert McKee
- Brian McLaren
- Necrobutcher
- Robin Parry
- Jonathan and Margie Phelps
- Lazar Puhalo
- Frank Schaeffer
- Oderus Urungus
- David Vincent
- William P. Young

== Production ==
Producer Kevin Miller began active work on Hellbound? in January 2011. During the production work, discussion and controversy over the subject of Hell was raised by the release of Rob Bell's book, Love Wins.

== Release ==
The first public screening of Hellbound was on 12 September 2012 in Nashville, Tennessee, followed by showings in other North American cities. The film was released on DVD and VOD on 28 May 2013.

== Reception ==
As of 19 October 2012, the review aggregator website Rotten Tomatoes indicated a 67% approval rating from critics.
