= Barbara Chernow =

- Born: New Hyde Park, New York
- Education: Susan E. Wagner High School; Brown University (B.A.)
- Occupations: Executive Vice President, Brown University
- Employer: Brown University
- Children: 2

Barbara Chernow is an American educator and since March 2015, Executive Vice President for Finance and Administration at Brown University. She served as Senior Vice President for Administration at Stony Brook University from 2012 to 2015. On December 12, 2014, Chernow was named as the next Executive Vice President of Finance and Administration at Brown University.

== Early life and education ==
Born in New Hyde Park, Long Island, raised in Brooklyn and Staten Island, Chernow attended Susan E. Wagner High School in Staten Island. She went on to attend Brown University and graduated with a BA in Economics and a minor in Education.

Chernow currently resides in Rhode Island with her husband.

== Career ==
Chernow has held a variety of senior management positions in facilities and operations including serving as the Vice President of Administration for the New York City School Construction Authority and as Director of the New York City Board of Education's Office of Pupil Transportation. She was also a past recipient of the Executive Leadership Award presented by the National Association of Professional Women in Construction.

Chernow joined Stony Brook University in 1998 as a special assistant to then President of Stony Brook University, Shirley Strum Kenny. At Stony Brook, Chernow held the Chair of the Project 50 Forward Operational Excellence Program Management Office, which oversaw efforts to streamline procedures, optimize programs and improve support services. From October 2007 to October 2013 she was President of Stony Brook University's Faculty Student Association, the not-for-profit organization that provides dining, retail and other auxiliary services to the Stony Brook campus community. Chernow was a member of State University of New York Business Officers' Association (SUBOA).

Chernow oversees Brown University's administrative side, which includes Facilities and Services, Budget, Human Resources, Audit and Finance. In this role she assists the President of Brown University Christina Paxson in defining the future goals and administrative plans for the university. Chernow is a member of the Society for College and University Planning (SCUP).
