= Operation Noah (charity) =

UK Climate Change ecumenical body

Operation Noah is an ecumenical Christian charity, based in the UK, that campaigns on climate change. Trustees include members who are Roman Catholic, Anglican and from other churches. The charity is managed by a Board of Trustees, with a small staff that works remotely as well as from offices in Waterloo, London. Operation Noah is funded through supporter donations and grants.

== History ==
Operation Noah was founded in 2004 by Christian Ecology Link (CEL), with its official launch in October that year. It later became a joint project of CEL and the Environmental Issues Network of Churches Together in Britain and Ireland, and gained charitable status in 2010.

In October 2009, the then Archbishop of Canterbury, Rowan Williams, gave the Operation Noah Annual Lecture at Southwark Cathedral, speaking on 'The Climate Crisis: A Christian Response'.

In February 2012, Operation Noah launched The Ash Wednesday Declaration, a theological response to climate change. The document was signed by a number of prominent Christian leaders, including Archbishop Desmond Tutu and Rowan Williams.

In September 2013, Operation Noah launched Bright Now, a campaign for UK church disinvestment in fossil fuel companies. In November/December 2013, Operation Noah was a partner on the Fossil Free UK Tour along with People & Planet and 350.org. The most notable fossil fuel divestment occurred in 2023 when the Church of England's National Investing Bodies, which include the Church Commissioners and the Pensions Board, announced that they would divest from all fossil fuel companies – a commitment which made international news. In December 2025, Operation Noah announced that the Diocese of Chichester had divested, the final Church of England diocese to do so.

== Activities ==
Operation Noah still encourages Church divestment from fossil fuels but is more actively campaigning for Churches and faith groups around the world to sign its Green Investment Declaration and commit to investing an initial 5% of their investment portfolios in climate solutions, with the aim of increasing the percentage invested in climate solutions over time. Operation Noah is also calling for UK Churches to achieve net zero land emissions by 2030 and to manage its land for climate and nature; this will include planting more trees, restoring peatlands, re-wilding and making other environmentally beneficial changes.

Other campaigns include a partnership with JustMoney Movement ('Big Bank Switch') calling on Christians to switch to a greener bank and stop banking with any of the UK High Street banks which continue to fund the fossil fuel industry.

== Awards ==
In 2024, Operation Noah won 'Campaign of the Year' at the National Campaigner Awards, sponsored by the Sheila McKechnie Foundation, for the success of its Bright Now campaign. In November 2024, Operation Noah celebrated its 20 year anniversary with a service at St John's, Waterloo, which featured an address from former Archbishop of Canterbury Rowan Williams and contributions from past and present Operation Noah staff and trustees, including the economist Ann Pettifor.
