= David P. Gushee =

American ethicist

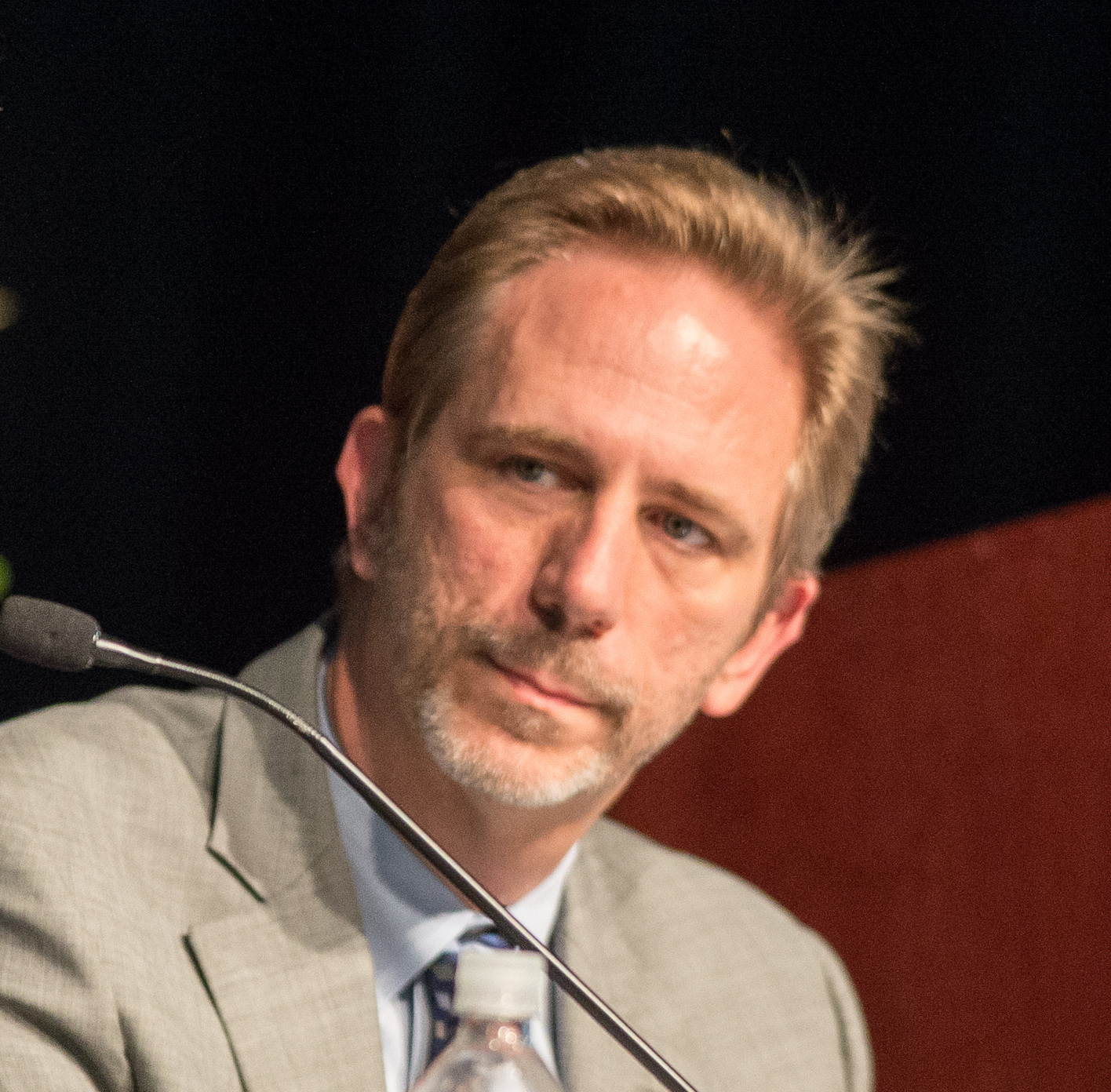
David Gushee

David P. Gushee (born June 17, 1962, Frankfurt, West Germany) is a Christian ethicist, Baptist pastor, author, professor, and public intellectual. Growing up, Gushee attended and completed his college years at College of William and Mary in 1984. After college, he received his Ph.D. in Christian ethics from Union Theological Seminary in 1993. Among the titles listed, Gushee has shown hard work and dedication in different parts of his job and was awarded for his achievements. Gushee is most known for his activism in climate change, torture, LGBT inclusion, and Post-evangelicalism.

== Work and membership ==
David P. Gushee is Distinguished University Professor of Christian Ethics and formerly the Director of the Center for Theology and Public Life at Mercer University. He is also Chair of Christian Social Ethics at the Faculty of Religion and Theology at Vrije Universiteit Amsterdam in cooperation with the International Baptist Theological Study Centre (IBTS Centre) in Amsterdam. He was formerly the Graves Professor of Moral Philosophy and the Senior Fellow of the Carl F. H. Henry Center for Christian Leadership at Union University in Jackson, Tennessee.

Gushee was elected in 2015 Vice President and 2018 Vice President of the American Academy of Religion. In January 2016 he was elected President-Elect of the Society of Christian Ethics.

Gushee served as president of Evangelicals for Human Rights, an organization advocating for an end to torture, especially that sponsored by the United States government; this organization has since become the New Evangelical Partnership for the Common Good. Gushee has also served on The Constitution Project's Detainee Treatment Task Force since December 2010. He helped draft the Evangelical Climate Initiative's Call to Action. He served on the Sojourners board of directors.

Gushee is a columnist for Baptist News Global, and has written for Religion News Service, Christianity Today, The Washington Post, and Sojourners.

== Scholarship and recognition ==
Gushee is an internationally recognized Holocaust scholar and ethicist, based on his 1994 book Righteous Gentiles of the Holocaust. He was appointed in 2008 by the United States Holocaust Memorial Museum to serve as a member of the Church Relations and the Holocaust Committee. He taught a summer seminar for college faculty at the USHMM.

Gushee's most important books include Kingdom Ethics (with Glen Stassen, 2003), The Sacredness of Human Life (2013), and Changing Our Mind (2014). Kingdom Ethics was Christianity Today's Theology/Ethics Book of the Year for 2004, and has been translated into eight languages. A second edition was released in 2016. Changing Our Mind has been translated into Korean and Spanish. A third edition was released in 2017.

Gushee is the author of well over one hundred scholarly articles, chapters and reviews and has written or edited twenty books.

Gushee was ordained to the Gospel Ministry at Walnut Hills Baptist Church in Williamsburg, Virginia in 1987.

He has received the Evangelical Press Association's Christian Journalism Award for 1991, 1992 and 1997, recognition of excellence in opinion writing.

Gushee was granted an honorary Doctor of Divinity (D.D.) degree in May 2009 by the John Leland Center for Theological Studies.

== Education ==
Gushee received his Ph.D. in Christian ethics from Union Theological Seminary in 1993, having earned his M.Phil. from Union Theological Seminary in 1990. Gushee earned his M.Div. from Southern Baptist Theological Seminary in 1987. He graduated Phi Beta Kappa with a B.A. from the College of William and Mary in 1984.

== Notable works ==
=== Evangelical Ethics (2015) ===
Gushee argues that Evangelicalism is a difficult concept to define due to the variety of associated meanings. Some academics have proposed that we abandon the term entirely due to its link with a restricted political goal. Some evangelicals have opted to dissociate themselves from evangelicalism, using names such as "Post-evangelicalism" to define themselves. Many scholars have approached the study of evangelicalism through a sociological lens and then disagreed about who counts as an evangelical. The book explores the different roles performed by scholars in shaping evangelicals' understandings of Christian ethics.

=== After Evangelicalism (2020) ===
In After Evangelicalism, Gushee says the book is for individuals who used to be "evangelicals" but are now post-evangelicals or ex-evangelicals. He states that he is post-evangelical. The overall concern is that evangelicalism's recent declines are part of a declining Christianity in the US, with Millennials being the least religiously affiliated group ever polled. Generation Z may be even less interested in religion. Young people are abandoning their churches, families, and friends. Some abandon Evangelical theology, while others abandon God, Jesus, the Bible, Holy Spirit, and Christianity as a whole. The evidence suggests that there is much more going on. Gushee writes this book about evangelical exiles' trauma, and freedom of belief. His book has three sections: "Authorities: Listening and Learning", "Theology: Believing and Belonging", and "Ethics: Being and Behaving." In all three sections, his proposals for post-evangelicalism are discussed, and he provides key takeaways after finishing each section. Gushee explains his transformation from evangelical to post-evangelicalism and gives advice to those evangelicals who are stuck. Discussing what went wrong with the white evangelicals and the history. Introducing a new way for Christian thinking and believing in God today. Assisting those post-evangelicals find their way and know how to have a relationship with God in their life. Showing how to live a healthy Post-evangelicalism life by disconnecting from how evangelical Christianity used to be.

== LGBTQ and activism ==
In Gushee's book Changing Our Mind, he narrates his journey from a traditionalist to a passionate advocate for LGBTQ Christians in the church and society, using an evangelical ethical framework to redefine the issue from sexual ethics to human dignity. Until the late 20th century, Christians by and large held to traditionalist views on LGBTQ issues, rooted in a reading of six to seven biblical passages that speak negatively of homosexuality and affirm a heterosexual norm. Gushee is against this and stands in solidarity with the LGBTQ community. In an interview with Christians for Social Action, Gushee states his reasoning for supporting the LGBTQ community and sees the harm that the church's traditionalist views and practices have caused harm on so many young people and families. Gushee believes the Holy Spirit sent Christian brothers and sisters who are gay and lesbian to him which became an important part of his local church. His sister is one of the LGBTQ Christians, and she struggles to figure out her sexuality in a church that is not inclusive of them. Therefore, this makes it a more personal situation. The church is a community, and Gushee believes that LGBTQ Christians should be "invited into that sexual ethic rather than being excluded from it." As a pastor, he has been contacted by young people and families reaching out for help due to this problem. There are so many that are still suffering, and he sees it as a big change that needs to happen because we need to "love our own LGBT children and care for the hurting and the broken." Despite what other Christian ethicists might say about him or what views they have, his commitment and moral obligation to making churches feel safe for LGBTQ families is important to him. As all Christians are taught to love God and to love our neighbors as ourselves.

== Controversy ==
As a Christian ethicist, Gushee has periodically been outspoken about current controversial societal topics. His positions on such issues as climate change, torture, and LGBTQ rights have often put him into conflict with his traditional evangelical constituency. For example, In 2015, Russell Moore, also a well-known Evangelical ethicist, implied that Gushee was not a true Evangelical because of his change of belief supporting LGBTQ civil rights. Gushee describes himself as "post evangelical” and attends both Catholic Mass and Baptist services.

== Books ==
- Ed. with Walter Jackson (1996). Preparing for Christian Ministry: An Evangelical Approach. Grand Rapids, MI: Baker.
- with Robert H. Long (1998). A Bolder Pulpit: Reclaiming the Moral Dimension of Preaching. Valley Forge, PA: Judson Press.
- Ed. with David S. Dockery (1999). The Future of Christian Higher Education. Broadman & Holman.
- Ed. (1999). Toward a Just and Caring Society: Christian Responses to Poverty in America. Grand Rapids, MI: Baker.
- Ed. (2000). Christians and Politics Beyond the Culture Wars: From Despair to Mission. Grand Rapids, MI: Baker.
- Righteous Gentiles of the Holocaust: Genocide and Moral Obligation (2nd ed.). Minneapolis, MN: Paragon House. 2003.
- with Glen Stassen (2003). Kingdom Ethics: Following Jesus in Contemporary Context. Downers Grove, IL: Intervarsity Press.
- Getting Marriage Right: Realistic Counsel for Saving and Strengthening Marriages. Grand Rapids, MI: Baker. 2004.
- Only Human: Christian Reflections on the Journey Toward Wholeness. San Francisco: Jossey-Bass. 2005.
- The Future of Faith in American Politics: The Public Witness of the Evangelical Center. Waco, TX: Baylor University Press. 2008.
- The Sacredness of Human Life: Why an Ancient Biblical Vision Is Key to the World's Future. Grand Rapids, MI: Wm. B. Eerdmans Publishing Co. 2013. ISBN 978-0-8028-4420-0.
- Changing Our Mind: A call from America's leading evangelical ethics scholar for full acceptance of LGBT Christians in the Church. Ann Arbor: ReadTheSpirit Books. 2014. ISBN 978-1939880765.
- with Sharp, Isaac B. (2015). Evangelical Ethics : A Reader. Louisville, Kentucky. ISBN 978-1-61164-599-6. OCLC 919341752.
- Still Christian: Following Jesus Out of American Evangelism. Louisville, KY: Westminster John Knox Press. 2017. ISBN 978-0664263379.
- After Evangelicalism: The Path to a New Christianity. Louisville, Kentucky. 2020. ISBN 978-0-664-26611-0. OCLC 1156415592.
- Introducing Christian Ethics: Core Convictions for Christians Today. Canton, Michigan. 2022. ISBN 978-1-64180-124-9. OCLC 1303273509.
