= Evangelical environmentalism =

Christian environmental movement

Evangelical environmentalism is an environmental movement in which some Evangelical Christian organizations have emphasized biblical mandates concerning humanity's role as steward and subsequent responsibility for the care taking of Creation. While the movement has focused on different environmental issues, it is best known for its focus of addressing climate action from a biblically-grounded theological perspective.

Some Evangelical groups have allied with environmentalists in teaching knowledge and developing awareness of global warming related to human activities.

== Overview ==
Evangelical environmentalists are based on the Bible, particularly on Genesis 2:15, to take care of God's Creation: "And the LORD God took the man, and put him into the garden of Eden to dress it and to keep it."

From an Evangelical environmentalist perspective, the response to the ecological crisis involves the restoration of correct doctrine, the restoration of Christianity as guide, and a balancing of the Bible and biology. It is important to Evangelical environmentalists that they are not seen as worshiping nature; they feel obligated to the stewardship of creation because of their focus on the creator of nature.

In Green Like God: Unlocking the Divine Plan for Our Planet Merritt states the Noah Covenant is God entering a Covenant with all the Earth by citing Gen 9:9-10. Merritt continues from Gen 2:15 ...

- "Cultivate it and keep it" New American Standard Bible
- "Tend it and watch over it" New Living Translation
- "Work it and keep it" English Standard Version
- "Take care of it and to look after it" Holman Christian Standard Bible
- "Till it and watch keep it" Revised Standard Version
- "Work the ground and keep it in order" The Message (Bible)

== Evangelical organizations ==
=== International Evangelical Environmental Network ===
The International Evangelical Environmental Network was founded in 1992 by the World Evangelical Alliance. In 2021, the Network has engaged in a number of candlelight vigils throughout the United States.

Young Evangelicals for Climate Action (YECA) was founded as youth ministry by the Evangelical Environmental Network. Members of Young Evangelicals for Climate Action participated in the September 2019 climate strikes at about a dozen colleges and universities, with a message of creation care and a faith-based approach to "speaking up for people's right to clean air and water and a stable climate."

=== Evangelical Climate Initiative ===
The Evangelical Climate Initiative was launched in February 2006 by the National Association of Evangelicals in the United States. The initiative aims to campaign for environmental reform, calling on all Christians to push for federal legislation that would reduce carbon dioxide emissions in an effort to stem global warming.

=== Creation Care Task Force ===
The Creation Care Task Force was founded in 2012 by the World Evangelical Alliance. In 2019, it established a Sustainability Center in Bonn, Germany.

== Criticism ==
In January 2006, a group of evangelicals opposed the Evangelical Climate Initiative's stance and issued a letter to the NAE which stated that "global warming is not a consensus issue, and our love for the Creator and respect for His Creation does not require us to take a position [supporting a cap and trade tax increase]". In 2007 the New York Times reported, "leaders of the conservative Christian wing of the Republican Party, including James Dobson, Gary Bauer and Paul Weyrich, told the policy director of the NAE, the Rev. Richard Cizik, to shut up already about global warming".

Ann Coulter focuses on Genesis 1:27-28 which gives dominion to humanity over nature. Ann Coulter claims: "God gave us the earth. We have dominion over the plants, the animals, the trees. God said, 'Earth is yours. Take it. Rape it. It's yours.'" Lynn White (1967) implies that this is a common view among Christians, but the accuracy of this statement is debatable.

== See also ==
- Anthropogenic hazard
- Christian views on environmentalism#Evangelical churches
- Cornwall Alliance
- Bill Moyers
- Public opinion on global warming
- The Green Bible
