= Environmental Performance Index =

Climate Index

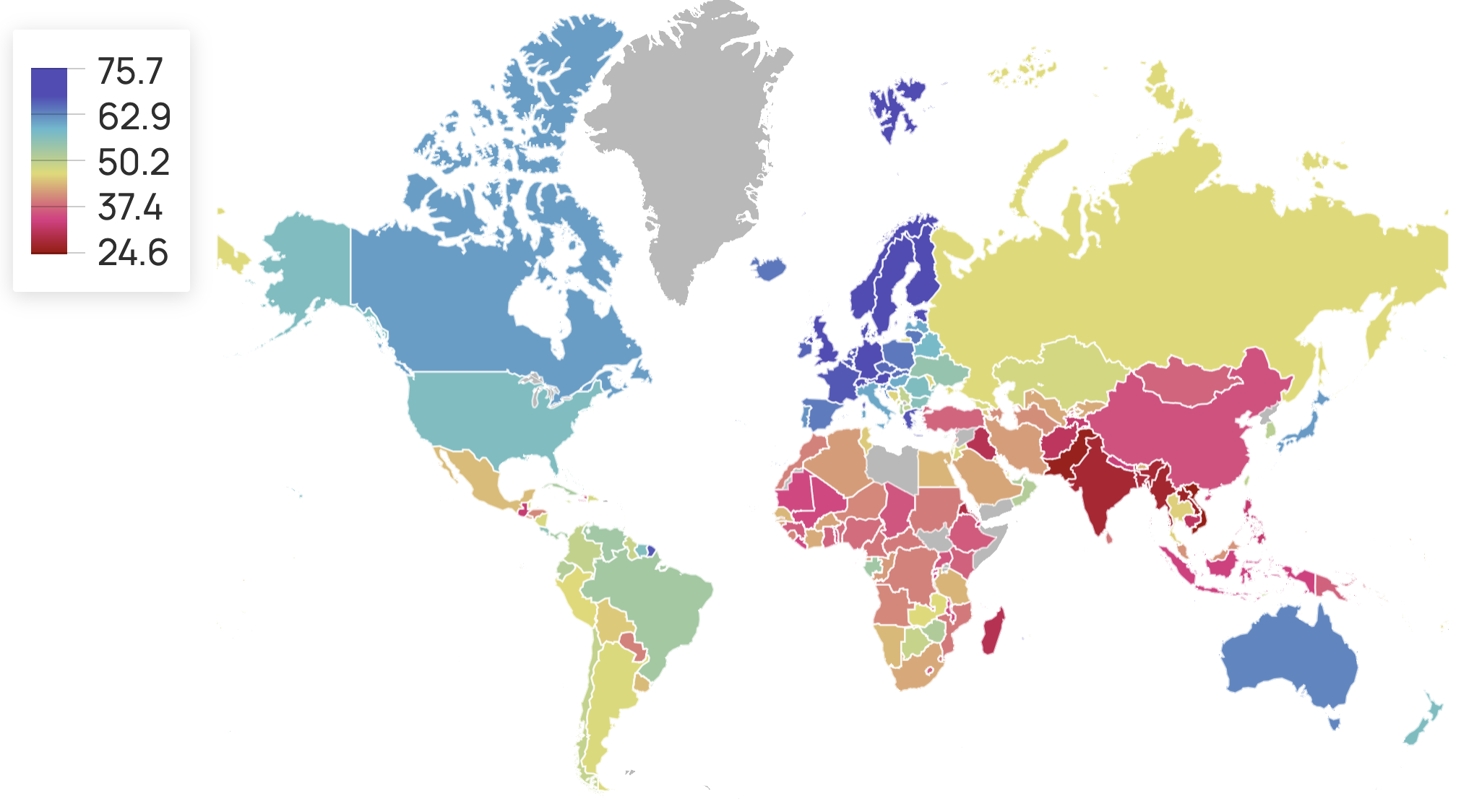
Global map of countries by Environmental Performance Index, 2024

The Environmental Performance Index (EPI) is a method of quantifying and numerically marking the environmental performance of a state's policies, highlighting the degradation of the planet's life-supporting systems on which humanity depends. A world economy that continues to rely heavily on fossil fuels translates into ongoing air and water pollution, acidification of the oceans, and rising concentrations of greenhouse gases in the atmosphere. These changes threaten the survival of species already suffering from widespread habitat loss, pushing them closer to extinction. Recent analyses show that humanity has already transgressed six out of nine critical planetary boundaries that define Earth's safe operating space — and is close to crossing a seventh.

The Environmental Performance Index (EPI) was started in 2002 by World Economic Forum in association with the Yale Center for Environmental Law & Policy (Yale University) and Center for International Earth Science Information Network Earth Institute (Columbia University). The biennial EPI report harnesses the latest data sets, science, and technology to provide the most comprehensive assessment of the state of sustainability around the world. In total, the 2024 EPI report incorporates 58 indicators to rank 180 countries on their progress at mitigating climate change, safeguarding ecosystem vitality, and promoting environmental health. This broad set of metrics is a powerful tool to track progress towards the UN Sustainable Development Goals, the climate mitigation targets in the 2015 Paris Agreement, and the biodiversity protection goals in the Kunming-Montreal Global Biodiversity Framework.

In 2023, the first global assessment of progress toward the goals of the Paris Agreement revealed a grim picture: the world is far off track. Despite record deployment of renewable energy, greenhouse gas (GHG) emissions keep rising. As the world enters uncharted climatic territory, there is a heightened risk of crossing irreversible tipping points in the planet's climate system.

== Methodology ==
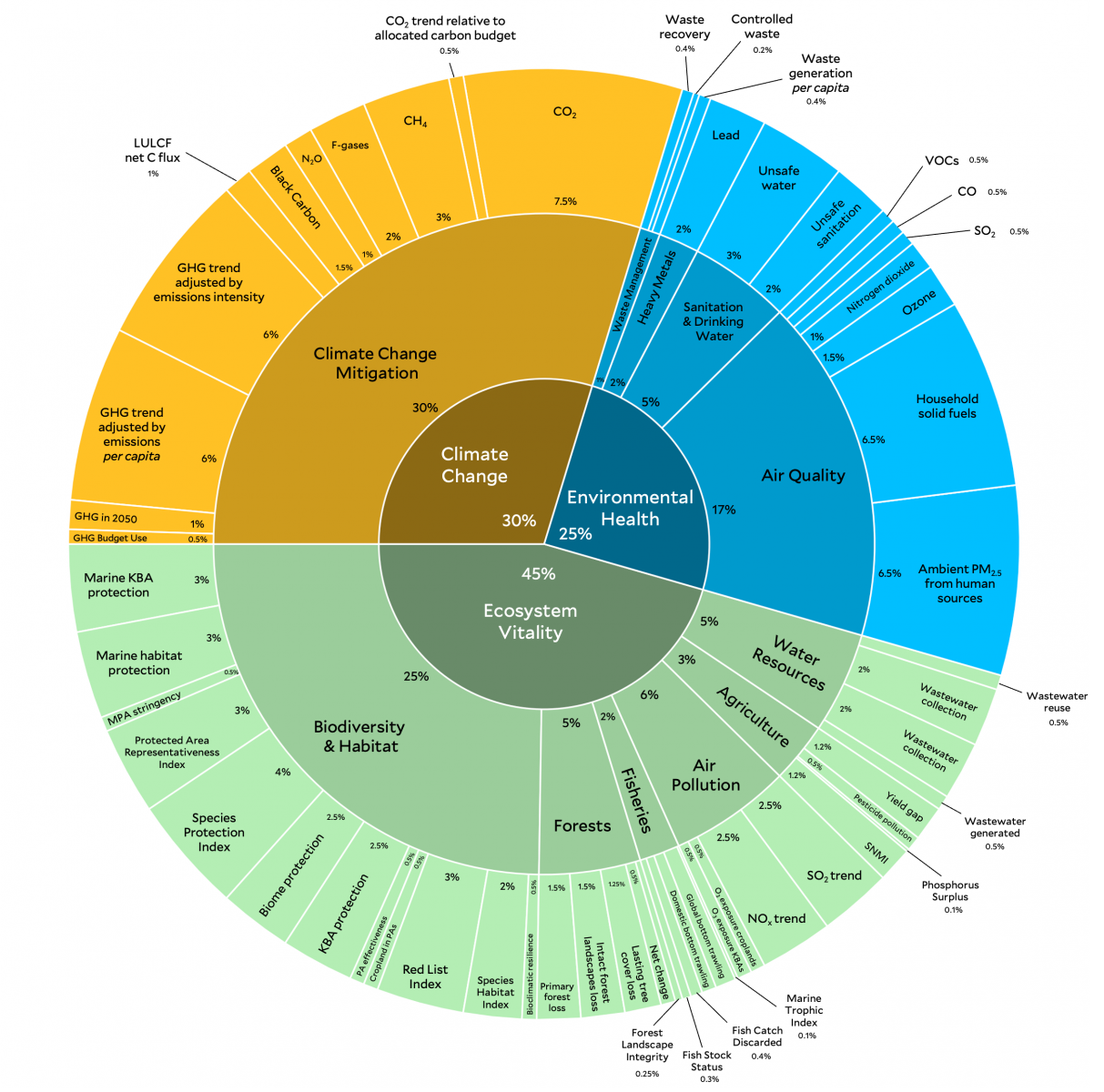
Environmental Performance Index Framework, 2024

Over time, the methodology for the EPI has been criticized for its arbitrary choice of metrics which could introduce bias, and its poor performance as an indicator for environmental sustainability. Additional criticisms center on the EPI's lack of specific policy suggestions, and the index's weighting biases against data deficient countries that has led to the overlooking of ecological progress in developing countries.

In 2024, India was ranked at 176 in the list and rejected the low ranking. As per a statement issued by the Ministry of Environment, Forests and Climate Change (MoEF&CC), it claimed that several indicators used in the calculation were based on unfounded assumptions and unscientific methods.

The United Nations Economic Commission for Europe found 3 Pros: EPI provides an easily comparable index; EPI's ecosystem vitality scores are based on six constituent policy categories: water resources, agriculture, forests, fisheries, biodiversity and habitat, and climate and energy; the referenced database yields maps for each of EPI's partial indices (normalised to 0 … 100) and 3 Cons: CIESIN's EPI rather is an attempt to quantitatively represent the ecological performance of countries and companies; actual reasons for dysfunctionalities might need further research; EPI would be a more policy-relevant index.

As a result of these criticisms, the number of EPI indicators has increased, and their weight has changed, to provide a better data-driven summary of the state of sustainability around the world. The 2024 index is based on 58 performance indicators grouped into 30 issue categories with an objective of environmental health, ecosystem vitality and climate change, ranking 180 countries.

2024 EPI indicators and weights (%)
Policy Objective	Wt. (%)	Issue Category	Wt. (%)	Indicator	Wt. (%)
Ecosystem Vitality	45%	Biodiversity & Habitat	25	Marine KBA Protection	12.0
Ecosystem Vitality	45%	Biodiversity & Habitat	25	Marine Habitat Protection	12.0
Ecosystem Vitality	45%	Biodiversity & Habitat	25	Marine Protection Stringency	2.0
Ecosystem Vitality	45%	Biodiversity & Habitat	25	Protected Areas Representativeness Index	12.0
Ecosystem Vitality	45%	Biodiversity & Habitat	25	Species Protection Index	16.0
Ecosystem Vitality	45%	Biodiversity & Habitat	25	Terrestrial Biome Protection	10.0
Ecosystem Vitality	45%	Biodiversity & Habitat	25	Terrestrial KBA Protection	10.0
Ecosystem Vitality	45%	Biodiversity & Habitat	25	Protected Area Effectiveness	2.0
Ecosystem Vitality	45%	Biodiversity & Habitat	25	Protected Human Land	2.0
Ecosystem Vitality	45%	Biodiversity & Habitat	25	Red List Index	12.0
Ecosystem Vitality	45%	Biodiversity & Habitat	25	Species Habitat Index	8.0
Ecosystem Vitality	45%	Biodiversity & Habitat	25	Bioclimatic Ecosystem Resilience	2.0
Ecosystem Vitality	45%	Forests	5	Primary Forest Loss	30.0
Ecosystem Vitality	45%	Forests	5	Intact Forest Landscape Loss	30.0
Ecosystem Vitality	45%	Forests	5	Tree cover loss weighted by permanency	25.0
Ecosystem Vitality	45%	Forests	5	Net change in tree cover	10.0
Ecosystem Vitality	45%	Forests	5	Forest Landscape Integrity	5.0
Ecosystem Vitality	45%	Fisheries	2	Fish Stock Status	15.0
Ecosystem Vitality	45%	Fisheries	2	Fish Catch Discarded	20.0
Ecosystem Vitality	45%	Fisheries	2	Bottom Trawling in EEZ	25.0
Ecosystem Vitality	45%	Fisheries	2	Bottom Trawling in Global Ocean	35.0
Ecosystem Vitality	45%	Fisheries	2	Regional Marine Trophic Index	5.0
Ecosystem Vitality	45%	Air Pollution	6	Ozone exposure KBAs	8.3
Ecosystem Vitality	45%	Air Pollution	6	Ozone exposure croplands	8.3
Ecosystem Vitality	45%	Air Pollution	6	Adj. emissions growth rate for nitrous oxides	41.7
Ecosystem Vitality	45%	Air Pollution	6	Adj. emissions growth rate for sulfur dioxide	41.7
Ecosystem Vitality	45%	Agriculture	3	Sustainable Nitrogen Management Index	40.0
Ecosystem Vitality	45%	Agriculture	3	Phosphorus Surplus	3.3
Ecosystem Vitality	45%	Agriculture	3	Pesticide Pollution Risk	16.7
Ecosystem Vitality	45%	Agriculture	3	Relative Crop Yield	40.0
Ecosystem Vitality	45%	Water Resources	5	Wastewater generated	10.0
Ecosystem Vitality	45%	Water Resources	5	Wastewater collected	40.0
Ecosystem Vitality	45%	Water Resources	5	Wastewater treated	40.0
Ecosystem Vitality	45%	Water Resources	5	Wastewater reused	10.0
Environmental Health	25%	Air Quality	17	Anthropogenic PM2.5 exposure	38.2
Environmental Health	25%	Air Quality	17	Household solid fuels	38.2
Environmental Health	25%	Air Quality	17	Ozone exposure	8.8
Environmental Health	25%	Air Quality	17	NO_{x} exposure	5.9
Environmental Health	25%	Air Quality	17	SO_{2} exposure	2.9
Environmental Health	25%	Air Quality	17	CO exposure	2.9
Environmental Health	25%	Air Quality	17	VOC exposure	2.9
Environmental Health	25%	Sanitation & Drinking Water	5	Unsafe sanitation	40.0
Environmental Health	25%	Sanitation & Drinking Water	5	Unsafe drinking water	60.0
Environmental Health	25%	Heavy Metals	2	Lead exposure	100.0
Environmental Health	25%	Waste Management	1	Waste generated per capita	40.0
Environmental Health	25%	Waste Management	1	Controlled solid waste	20.0
Environmental Health	25%	Waste Management	1	Waste recovery rate	40.0
Climate Change	30%	Climate Change Mitigation	30	Adjusted emissions growth rate for carbon dioxide	25.0
Climate Change	30%	Climate Change Mitigation	30	CO_{2} growth rate (country- specific targets)	1.7
Climate Change	30%	Climate Change Mitigation	30	Adjusted emissions growth rate for methane	10.0
Climate Change	30%	Climate Change Mitigation	30	Adjusted emissions growth rate for F-gases	6.7
Climate Change	30%	Climate Change Mitigation	30	Adjusted emissions growth rate for nitrous oxide	3.3
Climate Change	30%	Climate Change Mitigation	30	Adjusted emissions growth rate for black carbon	5.0
Climate Change	30%	Climate Change Mitigation	30	Net carbon fluxes due to land cover change	3.3
Climate Change	30%	Climate Change Mitigation	30	GHG growth rate adjusted by emissions intensity	20.0
Climate Change	30%	Climate Change Mitigation	30	GHG growth rate adjusted by per capita emissions	20.0
Climate Change	30%	Climate Change Mitigation	30	Projected emissions in 2050	3.3
Climate Change	30%	Climate Change Mitigation	30	Projected cumulative emissions to 2050 relative to carbon budget	1.7
Note: Wt. (%) is percent weights of overall EPI. Weights are rounded and may not add up to 100%.

== List of countries by 2024 EPI scores ==
The 2024 Environmental Performance Index report ranks 180 countries and territories, based on 58 performance indicators grouped into 11 issue categories. The top five countries are Estonia, Luxembourg, Germany, Finland and the United Kingdom, while the last ones are India, Myanmar, Laos, Pakistan and Vietnam. Sorting is alphabetical by country code, according to ISO 3166-1 alpha-3.

Country	Region	Value	Trend	Rank 2024
Afghanistan	South Asia	31.0	▲12.8	144
Angola	Sub-Saharan Africa	40.1	▲8.2	106
Albania	Europe & Central Asia	52.2	▲6.1	47
United Arab Emirates	Middle East & North Africa	51.6	▲9.1	48
Argentina	Latin America & Caribbean	47.0	▲1.1	70
Armenia	Europe & Central Asia	44.9	▲2.0	80
Antigua and Barbuda	Latin America & Caribbean	55.6	▲1.2	37
Australia	East Asia & Pacific	63.1	▲4.2	22
Austria	Europe & Central Asia	68.9	▲0.1	8
Azerbaijan	Europe & Central Asia	40.5	▼ −0.3	103
Burundi	Sub-Saharan Africa	33.5	▼ −1.3	138
Belgium	Europe & Central Asia	66.8	▲4.9	14
Benin	Sub-Saharan Africa	37.8	▼ −0.3	119
Burkina Faso	Sub-Saharan Africa	42.2	▲0.1	95
Bangladesh	South Asia	28.1	▲2.3	148
Bulgaria	Europe & Central Asia	56.2	▼ −1.2	35
Bahrain	Middle East & North Africa	35.3	▼ −1.4	131
Bahamas	Latin America & Caribbean	55.9	▲1.6	36
Bosnia and Herzegovina	Europe & Central Asia	46.0	▲3.3	75
Belarus	Europe & Central Asia	58.2	▲8.7	31
Belize	Latin America & Caribbean	47.4	▲0.9	67
Bolivia	Latin America & Caribbean	45.3	▲3.4	78
Brazil	Latin America & Caribbean	53.0	▲6.7	44
Barbados	Latin America & Caribbean	53.1	▲2.6	43
Brunei	East Asia & Pacific	48.3	▼ −3.1	62
Bhutan	South Asia	43.3	▲6.8	89
Botswana	Sub-Saharan Africa	49.2	▼ −1.8	59
Central African Republic	Sub-Saharan Africa	39.0	▼ −5.1	111
Canada	North America	61.1	▲3.5	27
Switzerland	Europe & Central Asia	67.8	▲2.3	9
Chile	Latin America & Caribbean	49.6	▲3.0	57
China	East Asia & Pacific	35.4	▲5.6	130
Ivory Coast	Sub-Saharan Africa	42.9	▲7.8	90
Cameroon	Sub-Saharan Africa	38.6	▲2.2	114
Democratic Republic of the Congo	Sub-Saharan Africa	39.5	▲6.0	109
Republic of the Congo	Sub-Saharan Africa	41.6	▲0.9	99
Colombia	Latin America & Caribbean	49.7	▲4.4	56
Comoros	Sub-Saharan Africa	38.2	▼ −5.9	115
Cape Verde	Sub-Saharan Africa	38.0	▼ −1.8	117
Costa Rica	Latin America & Caribbean	55.5	▲0.2	38
Cuba	Latin America & Caribbean	52.5	▲2.5	46
Cyprus	Europe & Central Asia	53.9	▼ −0.2	41
Czech Republic	Europe & Central Asia	65.5	▲0.4	16
Germany	Europe & Central Asia	74.5	▲4.3	3
Djibouti	Middle East & North Africa	32.3	▲0.2	141
Dominica	Latin America & Caribbean	49.3	▼ −0.2	58
Denmark	Europe & Central Asia	67.7	▼ −0.3	10
Dominican Republic	Latin America & Caribbean	47.7	▼ −1.1	66
Algeria	Middle East & North Africa	41.7	▲3.2	98
Ecuador	Latin America & Caribbean	51.3	▲7.0	49
Egypt	Middle East & North Africa	43.7	▲3.5	87
Eritrea	Sub-Saharan Africa	29.0	▼ −0.3	147
Spain	Europe & Central Asia	64.0	▲2.2	21
Estonia	Europe & Central Asia	75.7	▲14.9	1
Ethiopia	Sub-Saharan Africa	36.3	▲3.8	125
Finland	Europe & Central Asia	73.8	▲3.1	4
Fiji	East Asia & Pacific	46.0	▼ −2.4	75
France	Europe & Central Asia	67.0	▲1.6	12
Federated States of Micronesia	East Asia & Pacific	40.8	▲0.3	101
Gabon	Sub-Saharan Africa	53.3	▲7.3	42
United Kingdom	Europe & Central Asia	72.6	▲1.3	5
Georgia	Europe & Central Asia	47.3	▲6.2	68
Ghana	Sub-Saharan Africa	36.9	▲1.8	122
Guinea	Sub-Saharan Africa	36.5	▼ −2.9	123
Gambia	Sub-Saharan Africa	37.6	▲0.6	120
Guinea-Bissau	Sub-Saharan Africa	42.0	▼ −0.5	96
Equatorial Guinea	Sub-Saharan Africa	41.7	▼ −3.3	98
Greece	Europe & Central Asia	67.3	▲8.9	11
Grenada	Latin America & Caribbean	45.8	▲0.4	76
Guatemala	Latin America & Caribbean	32.5	▼ −2.8	140
Guyana	Latin America & Caribbean	49.0	▲2.3	60
Honduras	Latin America & Caribbean	40.2	▲2.9	105
Croatia	Europe & Central Asia	62.3	▲4.9	24
Haiti	Latin America & Caribbean	36.4	▲7.7	124
Hungary	Europe & Central Asia	59.8	▼ −1.3	30
Indonesia	East Asia & Pacific	33.6	▲5.8	137
India	South Asia	27.6	▲4.2	149
Ireland	Europe & Central Asia	65.8	▲2.8	15
Iran	Middle East & North Africa	41.8	▲0.0	97
Iraq	Middle East & North Africa	30.3	▲6.4	145
Iceland	Europe & Central Asia	64.3	▲2.5	18
Israel	Middle East & North Africa	48.0	▲0.6	63
Italy	Europe & Central Asia	60.3	▲4.8	28
Jamaica	Latin America & Caribbean	48.5	▲1.0	61
Jordan	Middle East & North Africa	47.3	▲10.1	68
Japan	East Asia & Pacific	61.4	▲4.2	26
Kazakhstan	Europe & Central Asia	47.8	▲4.0	65
Kenya	Sub-Saharan Africa	36.9	▼ −0.2	122
Kyrgyzstan	Europe & Central Asia	42.8	▲13.0	91
Cambodia	East Asia & Pacific	31.2	▲0.0	143
Kiribati	East Asia & Pacific	44.3	▼ −1.1	82
South Korea	East Asia & Pacific	50.6	▲4.9	51
Kuwait	Middle East & North Africa	44.4	▼ −1.8	81
Laos	East Asia & Pacific	26.3	▲2.0	151
Lebanon	Middle East & North Africa	39.9	▲7.9	108
Liberia	Sub-Saharan Africa	34.3	▲1.3	135
Saint Lucia	Latin America & Caribbean	51.1	▲2.1	50
Sri Lanka	South Asia	38.8	▲1.8	112
Lesotho	Sub-Saharan Africa	36.9	▲0.1	122
Lithuania	Europe & Central Asia	64.1	▲4.6	20
Luxembourg	Europe & Central Asia	75.1	▲3.4	2
Latvia	Europe & Central Asia	60.2	▲1.2	29
Morocco	Middle East & North Africa	39.5	▲2.6	109
Moldova	Europe & Central Asia	46.1	▲2.8	74
Madagascar	Sub-Saharan Africa	30.1	▲0.8	146
Maldives	South Asia	38.1	▲2.8	116
Mexico	Latin America & Caribbean	44.2	▲2.2	83
Marshall Islands	East Asia & Pacific	42.5	▲0.8	94
North Macedonia	Europe & Central Asia	50.3	▲1.2	52
Mali	Sub-Saharan Africa	34.5	▼ −3.3	134
Malta	Middle East & North Africa	66.9	▲4.7	13
Myanmar	East Asia & Pacific	27.1	▼ −1.4	150
Montenegro	Europe & Central Asia	47.7	▼ −0.5	66
Mongolia	East Asia & Pacific	37.2	▲5.4	121
Mozambique	Sub-Saharan Africa	39.0	▲5.2	111
Mauritania	Sub-Saharan Africa	34.6	▼ −3.5	133
Mauritius	Sub-Saharan Africa	47.3	▲2.9	68
Malawi	Sub-Saharan Africa	35.1	▼ −6.7	132
Malaysia	East Asia & Pacific	41.0	▲7.3	100
Namibia	Sub-Saharan Africa	44.0	▼ −0.1	85
Niger	Sub-Saharan Africa	40.0	▲7.3	107
Nigeria	Sub-Saharan Africa	37.9	▲4.7	118
Nicaragua	Latin America & Caribbean	47.4	▲1.2	67
Netherlands	Europe & Central Asia	66.9	▲4.4	13
Norway	Europe & Central Asia	69.9	▲3.3	7
Nepal	South Asia	33.1	▲0.7	139
New Zealand	East Asia & Pacific	57.3	▲1.1	32
Oman	Middle East & North Africa	51.3	▲12.9	49
Pakistan	South Asia	25.5	▼ −4.0	152
Panama	Latin America & Caribbean	52.9	▲5.2	45
Peru	Latin America & Caribbean	46.5	▲3.9	73
Philippines	East Asia & Pacific	32.1	▲0.4	142
Papua New Guinea	East Asia & Pacific	36.9	▼ −3.6	122
Poland	Europe & Central Asia	64.2	▲1.8	19
Portugal	Europe & Central Asia	61.9	▲4.1	25
Paraguay	Latin America & Caribbean	39.5	▲0.7	109
Qatar	Middle East & North Africa	46.8	▲5.6	71
Romania	Europe & Central Asia	57.3	▼ −3.1	32
Russia	Europe & Central Asia	46.7	▼ −0.1	72
Rwanda	Sub-Saharan Africa	33.9	▼ −0.3	136
Saudi Arabia	Middle East & North Africa	42.5	▲9.5	94
Sudan	Sub-Saharan Africa	39.1	▲3.9	110
Senegal	Sub-Saharan Africa	43.8	▲4.8	86
Singapore	East Asia & Pacific	53.0	▲6.5	44
Solomon Islands	East Asia & Pacific	42.2	▲1.6	95
Sierra Leone	Sub-Saharan Africa	39.9	▲5.3	108
El Salvador	Latin America & Caribbean	41.6	▼ −4.4	99
Serbia	Europe & Central Asia	49.8	▼ −5.6	55
São Tomé and Príncipe	Sub-Saharan Africa	36.2	▲1.8	126
Suriname	Latin America & Caribbean	56.9	▲8.6	34
Slovakia	Europe & Central Asia	65.1	▼ −1.6	17
Slovenia	Europe & Central Asia	62.4	▲0.0	23
Sweden	Europe & Central Asia	70.3	▲0.2	6
Eswatini	Sub-Saharan Africa	38.7	▼ −2.4	113
Seychelles	Sub-Saharan Africa	47.9	▼ −3.9	64
Chad	Sub-Saharan Africa	35.9	▲2.0	127
Togo	Sub-Saharan Africa	35.7	▼ −1.1	129
Thailand	East Asia & Pacific	45.7	▲4.5	77
Tajikistan	Europe & Central Asia	32.3	▼ −4.2	141
Turkmenistan	Europe & Central Asia	40.6	▲4.9	102
Timor-Leste	East Asia & Pacific	49.9	▲9.6	54
Tonga	East Asia & Pacific	40.4	▼ −7.3	104
Trinidad and Tobago	Latin America & Caribbean	52.5	▲1.0	46
Tunisia	Middle East & North Africa	45.3	▲0.5	78
Taiwan	East Asia & Pacific	50.1	▼ −0.1	53
Tanzania	Sub-Saharan Africa	43.6	▲5.6	88
Uganda	Sub-Saharan Africa	35.8	▲4.2	128
Ukraine	Europe & Central Asia	54.6	▲7.3	39
Uruguay	Latin America & Caribbean	44.1	▲0.5	84
United States	North America	57.2	▲0.2	33
Uzbekistan	Europe & Central Asia	42.6	▼ −1.3	93
Saint Vincent and the Grenadines	Latin America & Caribbean	54.2	▲0.8	40
Venezuela	Latin America & Caribbean	53.3	▲1.1	42
Vietnam	East Asia & Pacific	24.6	▼ −3.7	153
Vanuatu	East Asia & Pacific	45.0	▲9.3	79
Samoa	East Asia & Pacific	47.1	▲6.0	69
South Africa	Sub-Saharan Africa	42.7	▲4.4	92
Zambia	Sub-Saharan Africa	46.7	▲3.9	72
Zimbabwe	Sub-Saharan Africa	51.6	▲9.5	48

== EPI scores vs. GDP per capita, 2024 ==
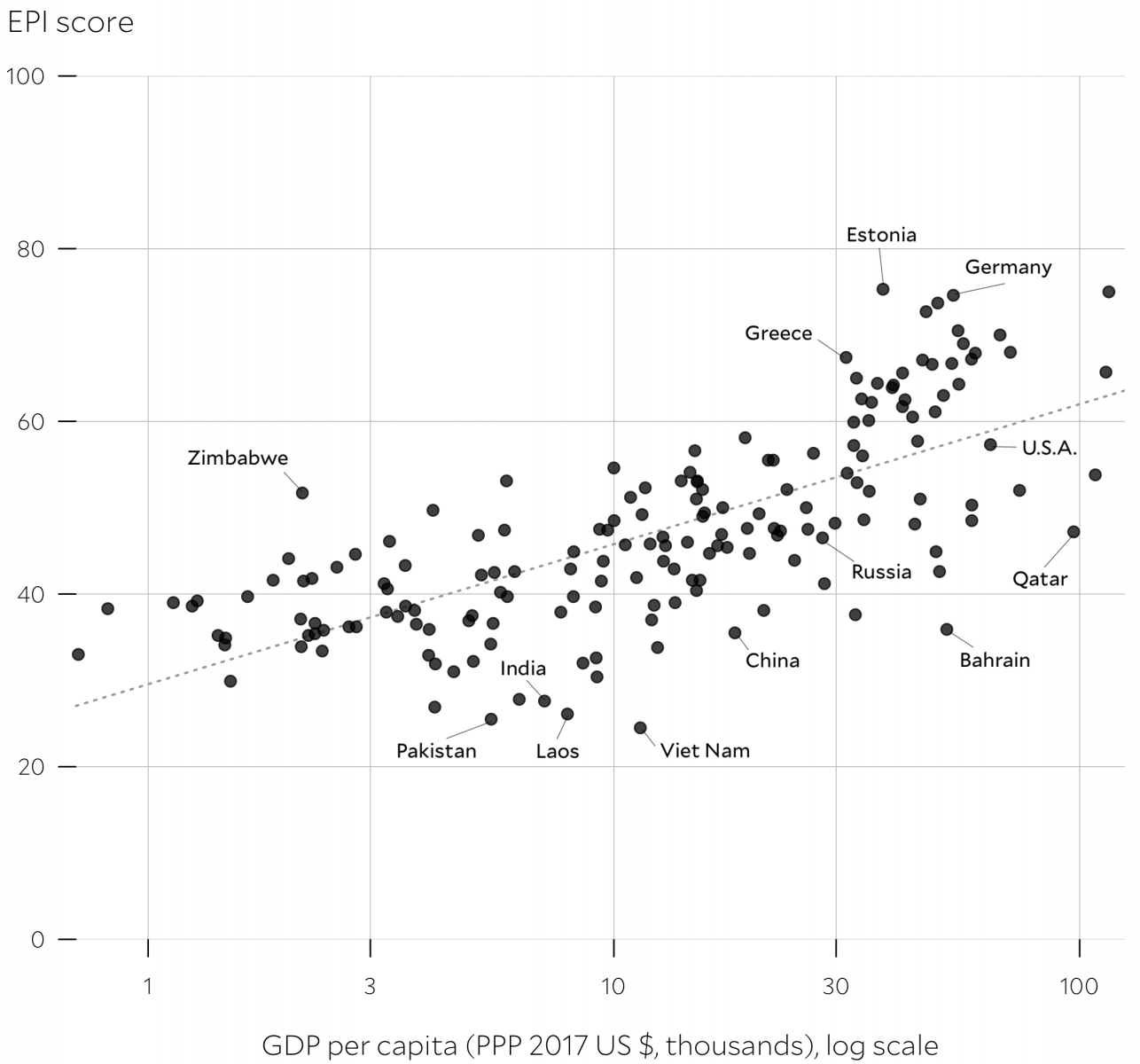
EPI scores vs GDP per capita, 2024 Countries’ wealth is a strong predictor of their overall environmental performance, but some countries vastly outperform their economic peers, while others lag.

EPI scores are positively correlated with a country's wealth, although after a point, increasing wealth yields diminishing returns. At every level of economic development, though, some countries outperform their peers while others lag. Some of the poorest countries in the world outperform some of the richest. In this regard, factors other than wealth, such as investments in human development, rule of law, and regulatory quality, are stronger predictors of environmental performance.

Wealth allows countries to make investments in the infrastructure required to provide clean drinking water, safely manage waste, and rapidly expand renewable energy. But wealth also leads to higher material consumption and its associated environmental impacts, such as higher rates of waste generation, GHG emissions, and ecosystem degradation. Many countries with high scores in some Ecosystem Vitality metrics — such as those measuring the pollution from pesticides and fertilizers in agriculture, the integrity of forest landscapes, and the use of destructive fishing methods — do so because their economies are stagnant and underdeveloped.

Developing countries must be careful not to repeat the mistakes of nations that followed an unsustainable path to industrialization. On the other hand, rich countries need to decouple their consumption from environmental degradation and use their wealth to help developing countries leapfrog to a path of truly sustainable development, preserving their biodiversity and other global commons for the benefit of all humankind.

== See also ==
- Environmental Vulnerability Index (EVI)
