= Post-evangelicalism =

Religious movement within Christianity

Post-evangelicalism is a movement of former adherents of evangelicalism, sometimes linked with the emerging church phenomenon, but including a variety of people who have distanced themselves from mainstream evangelical Christianity for theological, political, or cultural reasons. Most who describe themselves as post-evangelical are still adherents of the Christian faith in some form.

== History ==
Dave Tomlinson, a leader in a charismatic house church, and raised in a Brethren household, brought the term into mainstream use with the publication of his book, The Post Evangelical, launched at the 1995 Greenbelt festival. Tomlinson said that he first heard the term from a friend, although he "suspect[ed] the term had entered our consciousness surreptitiously a couple of years earlier." In his usage of the term, Tomlinson argues that evangelicalism is a response to modernism, no longer appropriate in a post modern world. He founded a congregation in a pub in Clapham, calling it Holy Joe's. This was intended to be for disaffected believers, and would allow an alternative pursuit of faith. Tomlinson argued that this term did not mean ex-evangelical. He argued that the movement rested on the evangelical assumptions, but moved "beyond its perceived limitations".

For Tomlinson, evangelicalism appeared to be exclusive and middle class, focused on opposition to liberalism, idolising the Bible in the process. He felt that it rejected ambiguity and propagated taboos. Tomlinson argued for "honesty, openness and a sincere searching for truth."

Tomlinson's thesis was met with scepticism. Graham Cray likened the movement to the 1920s liberal evangelicalism. The evangelical Alister McGrath thought the book was muddled and showed no awareness of modern scholarship, and although it found some support with Nigel Wright, he believed it was a "dead end" and that evangelicalism should be re-imagined from within. Wright wrote his own rival work, The Radical Evangelical (1996).

After he was ordained as an Anglican minister in 1997, Tomlinson no longer referred to post-evangelicalism, but instead adopted the term "progressive orthodoxy"

== Other definitions ==
Scot McKnight, writing in Christianity Today, says that post-evangelicals have become willingly disassociated with the mainstream evangelical belief system over difficulties with any combination of at least the following issues:

1. Questions over biblical inerrancy. Questions may relate to the biblical record of history, contradictions between scientific and scriptural explanations of the nature of the universe and humanity (e.g., the origin of the universe, homosexuality) or the discrepancies in descriptions of the personality of God in the different books of the Bible. Shrouding these issues are considerations about how the cultural understandings and linguistical limitations of the written word have influenced the way Scripture has been recorded and used.
2. Jesus versus Paul - Some post-evangelicals express concern over the role that the Apostle Paul of Tarsus played in the formation of the earliest Christian Church.
3. The moral failure of prominent evangelical leaders.
4. Many post-evangelicals have come of age during times of increasing multi-cultural awareness in Western society. They are presented with the educational lessons of the validity of all cultures and necessity for a pluralistic world-view. Tension exists between religious pluralism and the evangelical message of Christianity.
5. Questions of the role of women in church and society and the model of Christian marriage as taught in many evangelical churches.

== Publications ==
Publications identifying as post-evangelical include Recovering Evangelical, an online news and opinion portal for "evangelicals, post-evangelicals and those outside the church who still like Jesus", the blog Internet Monk, and Patrol Magazine.

Dave Tomlinson's book The Post Evangelical and Graham Cray's The Post Evangelical Debate are useful texts for understanding the movement and the debate surrounding it. See also David Gushee's book, After Evangelicalism: The Path to a New Christianity

== See also ==
- Atonement in Christianity
- Constructive theology
- New Monasticism
- Open evangelical
- Paleo-orthodoxy
- Postdenominationalism
- Postliberal theology

== Bibliography ==
- Atherstone, Andrew; Jones, David Ceri (11 July 2018). The Routledge Research Companion to the History of Evangelicalism. Routledge. ISBN 978-1-317-04152-8.
- McKnight, Scot (26 September 2008). "The Ironic Faith of Emergents". Christianity Today.
- Tomlinson, Dave (1995). The Post Evangelical. Triangle.
- Wright, Nigel (21 May 1996). The Radical Evangelical. SPCK Publishing. ISBN 9780281049523.
