= Marian Chertow =

American academic

Marian Ruth Chertow is an American academic specializing in environmental management.

== Biography ==
She holds a B.A. from Barnard College (1978), a M.P.P.M. from Yale University, and a Ph.D. from Yale University with thesis titled Accelerating commercialization of environmental technology in the United States: Theory and case studies.

Chertow is a full professor of industrial environmental management, director of the program on solid waste policy, and director of the Center for Industrial Ecology Yale School of the Environment. She has appointments as visiting professor at the National University of Singapore and Nankai University in Tianjin, China. Her current research addresses industrial ecology, business/environment issues, waste management, and environmental technology innovation.

She is a pioneer in the area of industrial symbiosis, a sub-field of Industrial ecology that is focused on the shared management of resources by companies in relative geographic proximity. She convened the first international research symposium on industrial symbiosis in 2004. This meeting brings researchers and practitioners together to discuss current practices and future trends in the field, and is held annually in different parts of the world. Chertow also serves on the managing board of the Journal of Industrial Ecology., the editorial board of BioCycle magazine, the board of the Eco-Industrial Development Council, as well as on the advisory board of the Connecticut Clean Energy Fund. Her work has been mentioned in the press to explain how concepts and scholarship related to industrial ecology and industrial symbiosis is useful to businesses all over the globe.

In 2014, she was honored by the Connecticut Women's Hall of Fame for her longtime commitment to environmental innovation.

Early in her career Chertow worked for Peter Karter at Resource Recovery Systems. Chertow has worked in environmental management for the cities of San Francisco and Windsor, Connecticut, and for the state of Connecticut serving as president of the Connecticut Resources Recovery Authority.

== Books ==
- Developing Industrial Ecosystems: Approaches, Cases and Tools, edited volume with M. Portlock for Yale School of Forestry and Environmental Studies Bulletin Series, No. 106, February 2002.
- Thinking Ecologically: The Next Generation of Environmental Policy, edited with Daniel C. Esty, Yale University Press, 1997; Chinese translation 2004.
- The Ecology of Recycling; UN Chronicle, September 2009
