= God's Warriors =

2007 CNN documentary

CNN Presents: God's Warriors is a three-part August 2007 CNN Presents documentary produced by Christiane Amanpour in which she examines the rise of religious fundamentalism as a political force in the world. The documentary was filmed in the United States, Europe and Middle East. It focuses on the three major monotheistic religions of the world, Judaism, Christianity, and Islam.

The three chapters were titled God’s Jewish Warriors, God’s Muslim Warriors, and God’s Christian Warriors. The first describes the Jewish settlement movement in Israel and the fund-raising in the United States that supports it, while the second presents issues of radical Islam and Sharia law. The final segment focused on the United States and the political influence of Christian religious leaders.

“God’s Warriors is an investigation of religion, at a time when religious activism is a signature cultural phenomenon of our times,” said Mark Nelson, vice president and senior executive producer for CNN Productions. “This project’s global scope is ideally suited for the skills of someone with as impressive of a journalistic pedigree as our own Christiane Amanpour.”

For this documentary, Amanpour reports that during the last 30 years, each faith has exploded into a powerful political force comprising followers who share a dissatisfaction with modern society, and a determination to place God and religion back into daily life and to the seats of power. “There are millions of people around the world who feel that their faith is being ignored – pushed aside – and they are certain they know how to make the world right,” Amanpour says. “We cannot and should not ignore them. And, with this report, we’ve tried to explain them.”

== God’s Jewish Warriors ==
- First aired: August 21, 2007

This part covered, among others, a Jewish group that planned to blow up the Dome of the Rock in Jerusalem, in order to sabotage Israeli-Egyptian peace talks and the Jewish extremist Yigal Amir, who assassinated Israeli Prime Minister Yitzak Rabin.

It also covered Christian Zionists in America who have raised money to support the activities of the settlers and how the pro-Israel lobby’s clout in Washington has supposedly helped religious settlers remain in the West Bank.

Amanpour interviewed Theodor Meron, who in September 1967 was the Foreign Ministry lawyer, and wrote a top secret memo saying that "civilian settlement contravenes the explicit provisions of the Fourth Geneva Convention, which protects people living under occupation." Meron still believes this is true. Shimon Peres, who supported the settlements, said that, while he didn't know whether Meron was right from a legal point of view, he was wrong "from a pragmatic point of view," because Israel was under steady attack.

God’s Jewish Warriors was filmed in the West Bank, Israel, the United Kingdom and the United States.

== God’s Muslim Warriors ==
- First aired: August 22, 2007

This part covers Ayaan Hirsi Ali, as well as Ed Husain, a young Muslim who describes himself as having been radicalized as a youth to accept an extremist Islamist ideology that seeks to return peace to the world through a restoration of a governing caliphate—an ideology he now rejects.

God’s Muslim Warriors was filmed in the United Kingdom, Egypt, Iran, the West Bank, the Netherlands and the United States.

== God’s Christian Warriors ==
- First aired: August 23, 2007

In God’s Christian Warriors, Amanpour reports on evangelicals trying to influence American politics and society from a faith-based perspective. The report covers Rev. Jerry Falwell, and his organization, the Moral Majority. The report contains Falwell's last interview, conducted with Amanpour just one week before his death. Amanpour also traveled from Washington State to Washington, D.C., meeting conservative Christians engaged on the front lines of a battle against what they see as a faithless, valueless popular culture that has turned away from its Biblical roots.

God’s Christian Warriors was filmed in the United States.

== About the documentary ==
The God’s Warriors series includes interviews with former President Jimmy Carter, the Rev. Jerry Falwell, Noa Rothman and Kamal el-Said Habib, a reformed Islamic jihadist who was part of the violent militant group that assassinated Egyptian President Anwar Sadat.

A companion Web site to God's Warriors offers excerpts from the documentary, an audio podcast and an exclusive video diary that goes behind-the-scenes with producers as they traveled in Europe, North America, Africa and the Middle East for principal filming.

The managing editor of God’s Warriors is Kathy Slobogin. Andy Segal, Michael Mocklar and Ken Shiffman are senior producers; Cliff Hackel and Dave Timko are director–editor–producers; Brian Rokus, Jen Christensen and Julie O'Neill are producers. Jody Gottlieb is the executive director of CNN Productions.

== Criticism ==
It won a Peabody Award in 2007 "for producing the most thorough exploration of religious fundamentalism and its implications presented to date on television."

Fr. Jonathan Morris said of God's Warriors in an interview on Fox News, "I think another thing that this documentary does in a very bad dishonest way is that it comes up with the very stale, I think, inappropriate accusation or insinuation that religion is the real cause for all the evil in this world."

The Committee for Accuracy in Middle East Reporting in America (CAMERA), a pro-Israeli American media monitoring organization based in Boston, took out a newspaper ad attacking the documentary, accusing it of, among other things, "equating the extremely rare cases of religiously-inspired violence on the part of Christians and Jews with radical Islam's global, often state-supported, campaigns of mass killing" and "presenting highly controversial critics of Israel and the so-called Israel lobby and doing so without challenge".

On the other side of the political spectrum, MSNBC host and general manager Dan Abrams called the documentary "the worst type of moral relativism" and "shameful advocacy masked as journalism.".

Brian Lowry of Variety stated that he felt it was like "a greatest-hits compilation of religious intolerance and fanaticism" and while the three-part structure made "obvious sense", the time to point out were "excessive".

Christiane Amanpour has responded that the documentary is not meant to compare religions, but rather to show "that each faith has their committed and fervent believers, and we're showing how each of those are active in the political sphere in today's world."
