= Blessing of animals =

Ceremonial blessing of companion, agricultural, or working animals

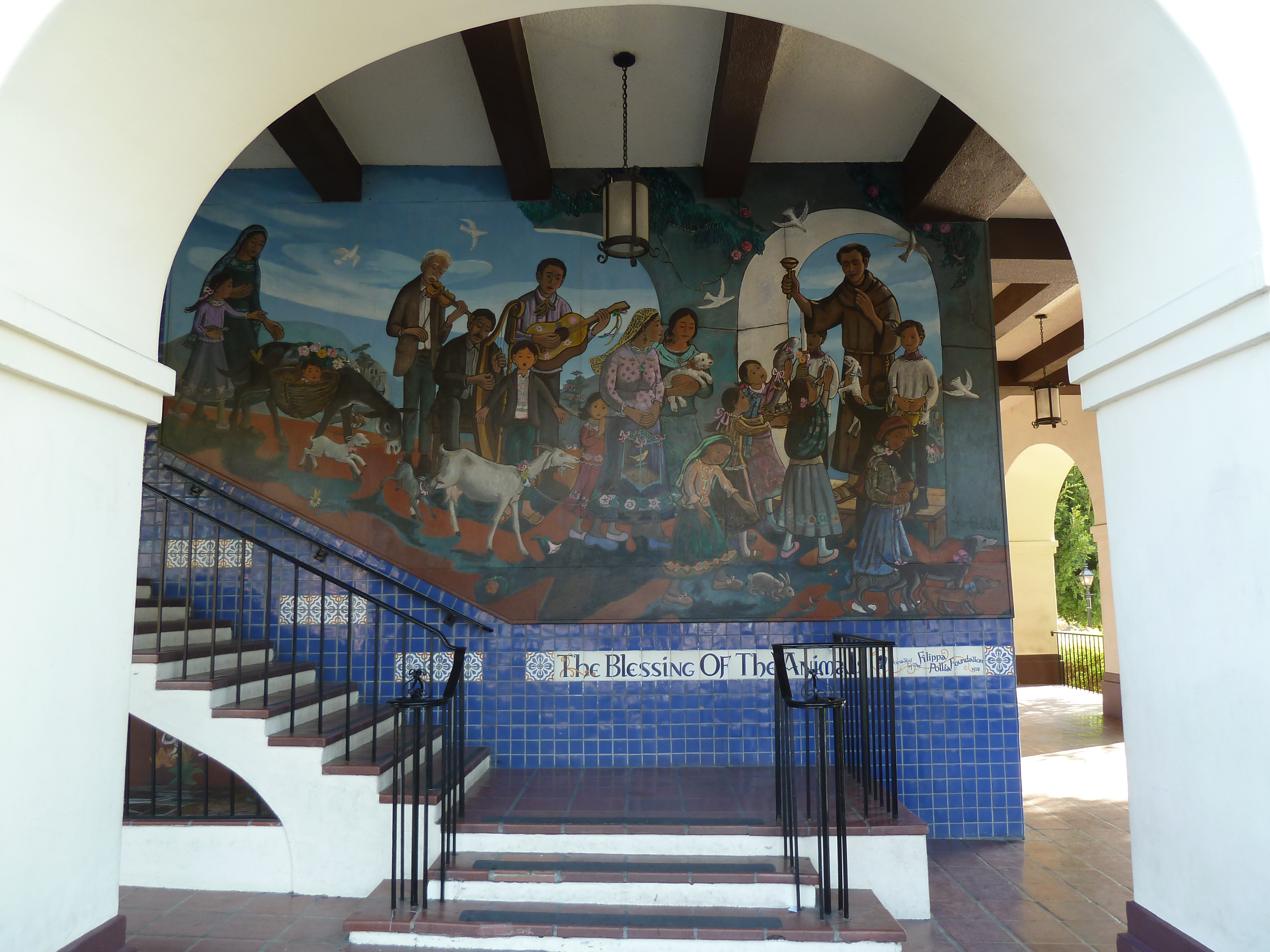
Blessing of the Animals Mural, Mexican Consul, Los Angeles

Blessing of animals can be either of the animal or of the human-animal relationship, and can apply to pets and other companion animals, or to agricultural animals and working and other animals which humans depend on or interact with. Blessing of animals, or of the slaughtering process, before slaughter, is a key element of most religions. Ceremonial blessing of companion animals occurs throughout the world, for example, Australia, Canada, Scotland, Spain, and the United States.

Blessing of animals is a religious activity, and occurs broadly across most religions in some form, including Christianity, Islam, Judaism, Shinto, and Unitarian Universalism. Secular respect for animals is also strong, for example though World Animal Day, an international day of action for animal rights and welfare celebrated annually. It is still held on 4 October, the feast day of Francis of Assisi, a Christian patron saint of animals.

== Christianity ==
Blessing of the Animals on St. Francis' Day at an Episcopal church in Lincoln, Nebraska

Annually now, on or around October 4, Christians worldwide celebrate the Feast of Saint Francis—the conclusion of Creationtide—with a blessing of animals and prayers for creation. Catholicism and Evangelical Lutheranism have specific liturgies for the blessing of animals, highlighting creation and interdependence. United Methodists also have a specific liturgy highlighting creation and mutual interdependence. Separate variants of Christianity will sometimes combine to hold joint, ecumenical, animal blessing ceremonies, for example Catholic, Lutheran and Episcopal/Anglican churches.

== Judaism ==
Many synagogues now have ceremonies for the blessing of animals, and some say the idea may have originated in ancient Judaism. The Jewish ceremony is often performed on the seventh day of Passover (in the spring) as a celebration of the Hebrews’ (and their animals’) emancipation from slavery in Egypt more than 3,000 years ago. Many Jewish congregations schedule blessings of the animals after the High Holy Days, with ceremonies around the second weekly Torah portion of the Jewish Year, the Parashat Noach, the portion about Noah and the ark, the saving of both humans and other animals, they also being gifts from God. Other Jewish ceremonies are derived from the Christian ceremony and are not derived from traditional Judaism, which gives some concern for more traditional followers of Judaism.

Elvis Best "read" the Torah at his Bark Mitzvah in 2007.

=== Ritual slaughter ===
For meat to be kosher, a ritual blessing is required for the production area, shechita.

=== Coming of age ===
A Bark Mitzvah is an observance and celebration of a dog's coming of age, analogous to the Jewish traditional Bar Mitzvah and Bat Mitzvah terminology. The term has been in use since at least 1958. The bark mitzvah ceremony is not universally well regarded in Judaism.

== Islam ==
=== Ritual slaughter ===
Islamic dhabiha requires that God's name be pronounced before each slaughter.

== Culturalisation ==
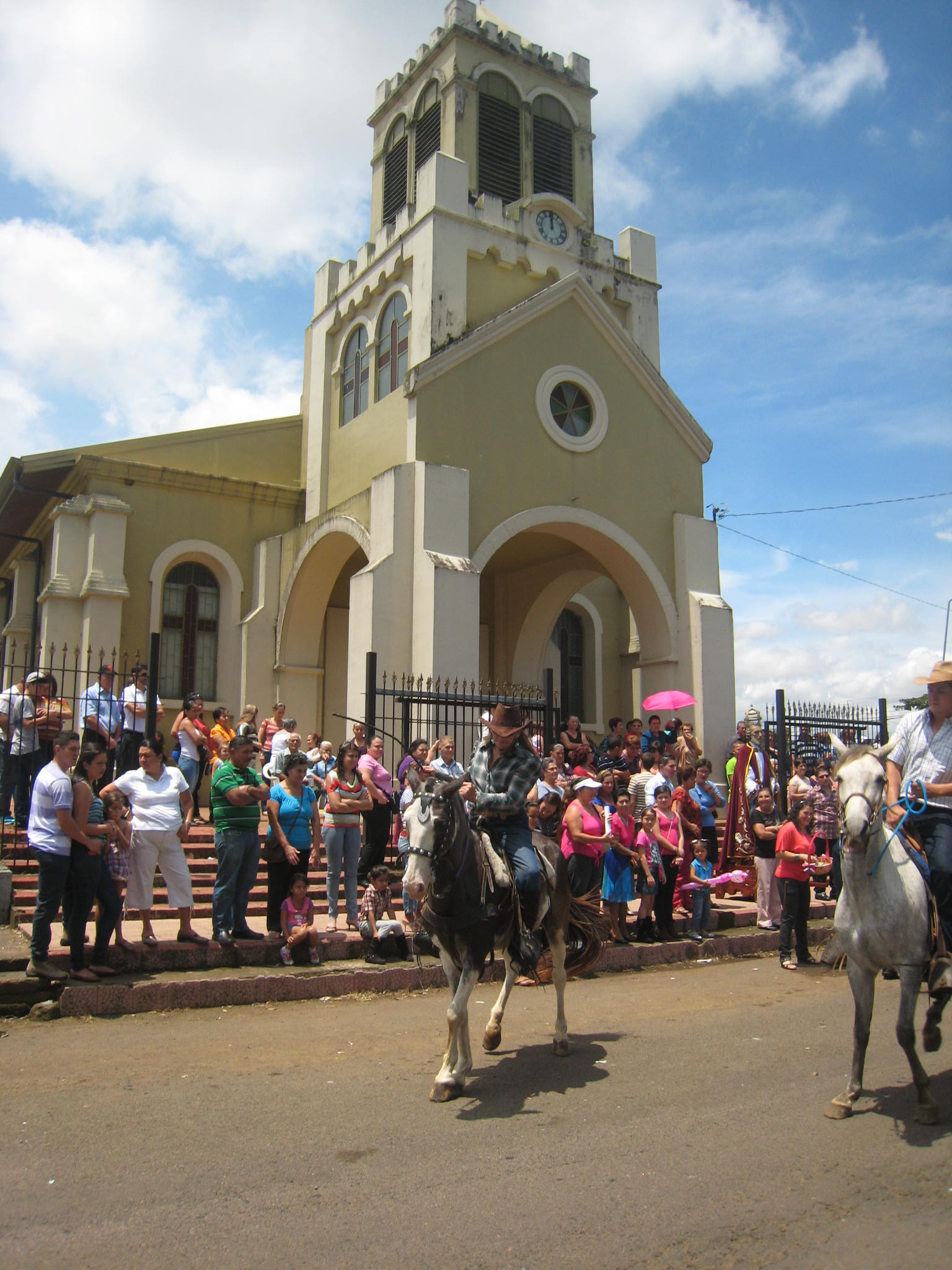
Blessing of cars, horses, and vehicles in front of the church of San Pedro de Santa Bárbara de Heredia, Costa Rica

Some towns and cities have the blessing of animals as a cultural event, for example:

- San Juan del Río, on January 17, feast day of San Antonio.
- Unterammergau, the site of the 11th-century Chapel of St Leonhard, patron saint of horses, which is the terminus of the annual Leonhardritt and Blessing of the Animals.
- Blessing of the Animals at Olvera Street, an event from 1930, is held every Sabado de Gloria (Holy Saturday). It is an all-day event with vendors, performers, and a procession where participants bring their animals to be blessed by religious authorities and others.
- Madrid, where the festival has been celebrated largely uninterrupted since the 19th century. It is also held in other parts of Spain, such as the Balearic Islands in the Mediterranean and the northern city of Burgos.
- During the latter part of the 20th century, the blessing of animals and pets in the United States has become mainstream cultural activity, with services occurring in 48 states and districts in 2008.

== Culturally significant animals ==
Rare animal instances can have great significance in belief systems and may be ritually blessed as part of that tradition, for example the white buffalo, Kenahkihinén, in North America.

== In popular culture ==
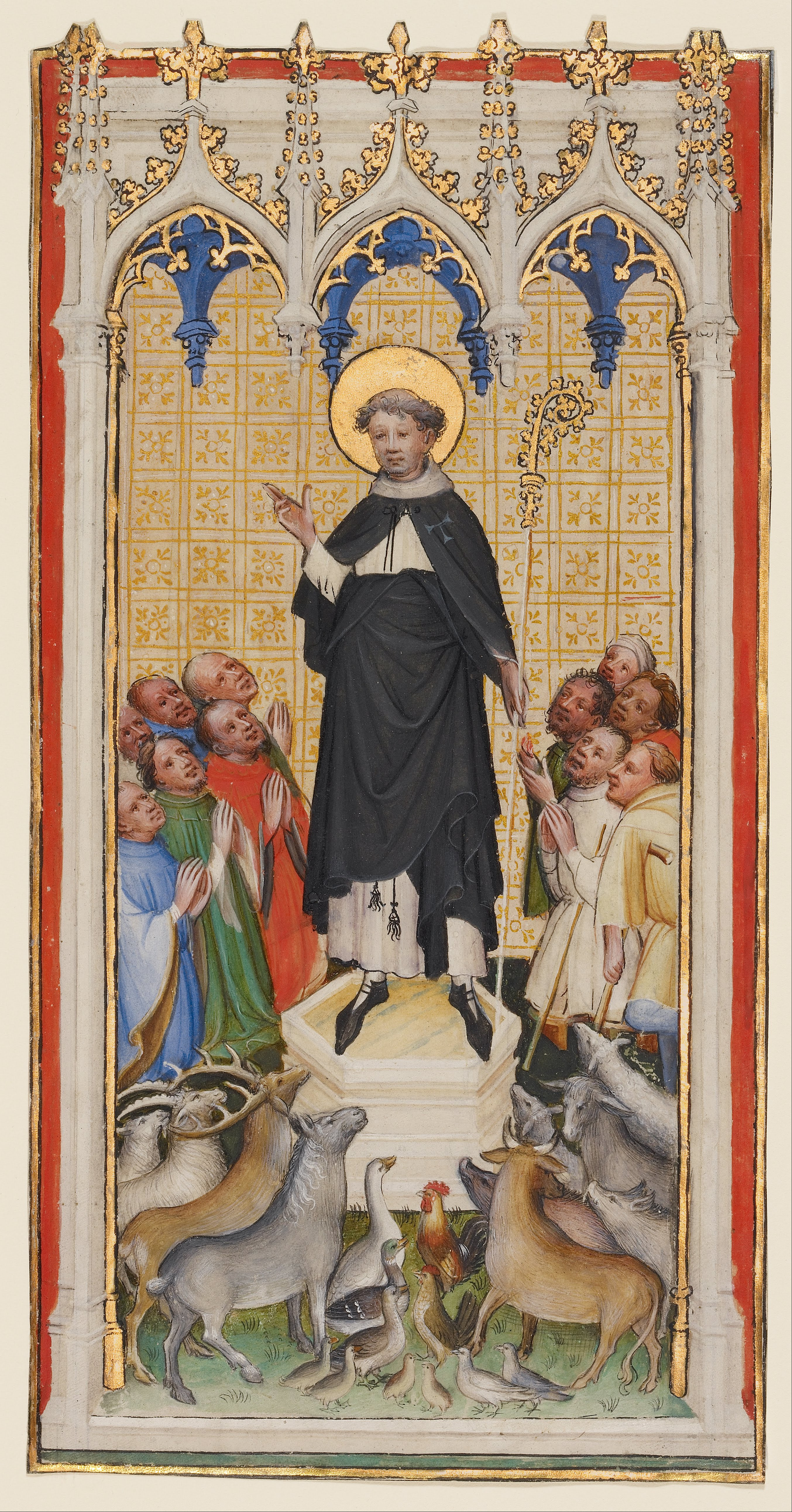
Saint Anthony Abbot Blessing the Animals, the Poor, and the Sick

=== In art ===
- Master of Saint Veronica's Saint Anthony Abbot Blessing the Animals, the Poor, and the Sick (painted sometime 1395–1420)
- Henry Barraud's The Pope blessing the Animals (painted in 1842)

=== In film ===
- Au hasard Balthazar, a 1966 French film, has a scene in which a donkey is baptized
- La comadrita, a 1975 Mexican film about an indigenous woman who baptises animals

== Historical animal blessing and prayer ==
=== Pre-Christian ===
The Lorscher Bienensegen, believed to date back to the 9th century, is a Christian bee-keeping prayer written in Old High German to bring honey bees back to their hives in good health, and may arise from earlier Anglo-Saxon and apparently pagan "For a Swarm of Bees" in pre-Christian Germanic areas.

=== Christianity ===
Saint Francis of Assisi is associated with the patronage of animals and it has become customary for Catholic, Lutheran and Anglican churches to carryout animal blessing ceremonies on his feast day of 4 October. Saint Dwynwen is more known for being a Welsh patron saint of lovers but she is also lesser known as being the patron saint of sick animals which she would bless. Legend has it that in the 4th century whole herds of wild animals would come for the blessing of Saint Blaise.

=== Islam ===
==== Cats ====
According to legend, a cat saved Muhammad from a snake. In gratitude, Muhammad stroked the cat's back and forehead, thus blessing all cats with the righting reflex.

== Animal chaplaincy ==
Animal chaplaincy is typically associated with veterinary work. Veterinary chaplains minister in regard to the spirituality associated with animals and the human-animal bond and responsibilities, and perform animal blessings as part of a broad range of services.

== Types of animals blessed ==
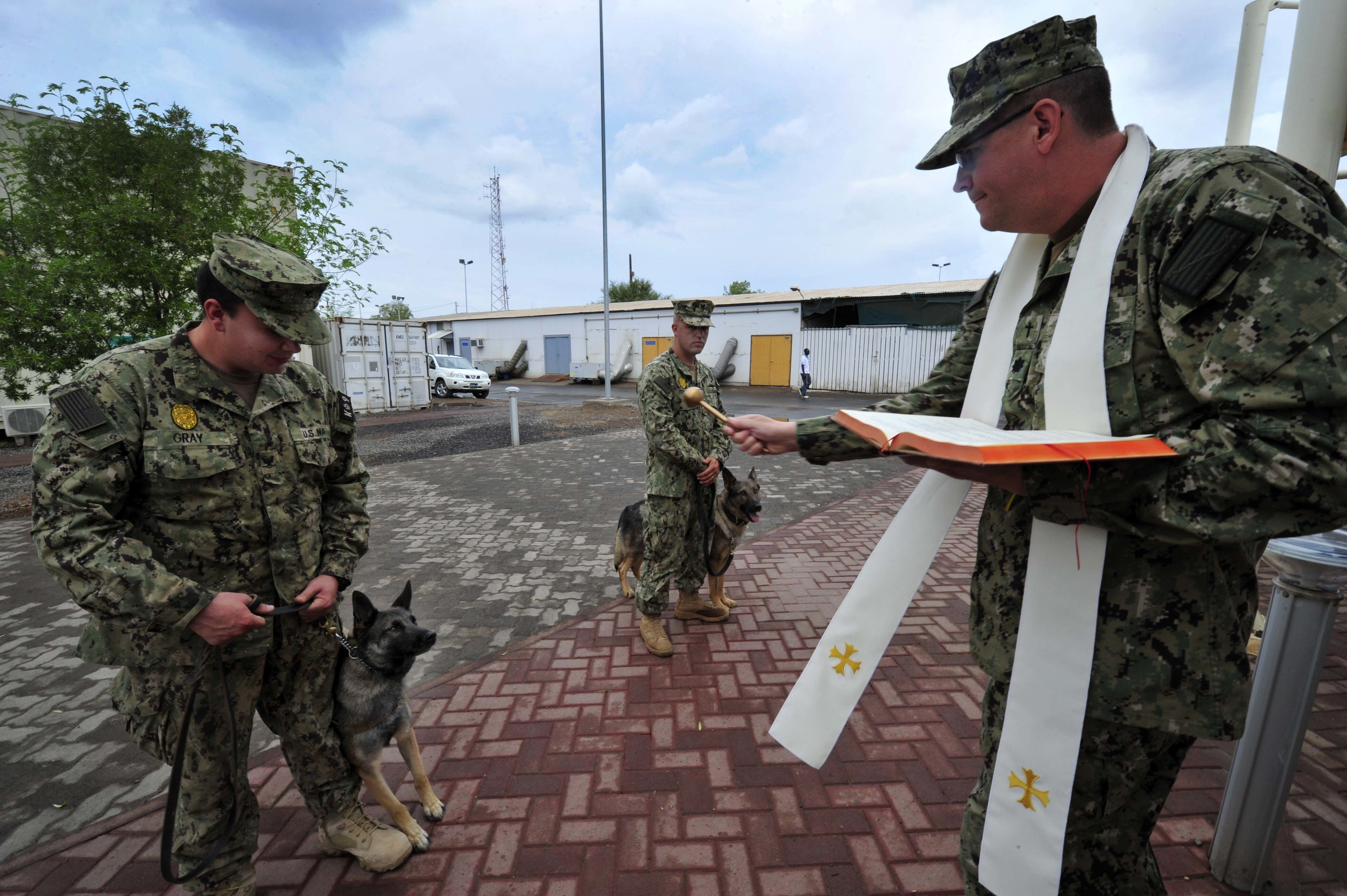
The blessing of a working animal, a military dog.

Any animal can be blessed and a wide variety have been blessed during blessing ceremonies. It depends on what people bring on the day. Included have been:

- Australia: dogs, cats, tropical birds, reptiles, rodents, native Australian bees, goldfish, ferrets, hermit crabs, mounted police horses, rabbits, mice
- Spain: dogs, rabbits, iguanas, doves
- Canada: horses, dogs, cats, birds, donkeys, sheep, hawks, parrots, weasels, skunks
- Working animals, for example military or police dogs.

== Practical issues ==
The safety of animals and people is important. Due consideration also needs to be given to any mess some animals may make.

== Counterpoint ==
PETA have an alternative view on animal blessing events and proffer the following points:

- Cats are terrified and should be left at home. The blessing is for the animals so the animals' welfare should not be sacrificed for the ceremony.
- Many animals, all created by God, miss out on the blessing, and are mutilated and abused for our sake. PETA states St. Francis would be appalled by the degree of suffering that humans inflict on animals to indulge in acquired taste for their flesh.
- PETA suggest two Franciscan Animal Blessings.

== See also ==
- Animal worship
- Comparison of Islamic and Jewish dietary laws
- Pet humanization
- World Animal Day
