= Lady Greyhound =

Mascot for US Greyhound Lines bus company

Lady Greyhound was a marketing mascot of the U.S. Greyhound Lines bus company in the 1950s.

The Greyhound Lines had used the greyhound symbol since the 1920s, but by the 1950s it was competing with the increase of the private car ownership. Grey Advertising, Greyhound's advertising agency, came up with a marketing campaign using an animal mascot.

The first dog to take the mantle was a white and gold greyhound born on January 28, 1957, in Clay Center, Kansas. Her TV career began as a puppy in a Greyhound TV commercial in The Steve Allen Show where she was dubbed "Steverino." The Dog Welfare Guild chose her as Queen of National Dogweek the same year. She also had her own fan clubs, was a symbol of a Philadelphia safety campaign, and was insured by Lloyd's for $300,000.

When the Greyhound company stopped its sponsorship of The Steve Allen Show in March 1959, the dog was renamed Lady Greyhound and the name change was announced in two Jack Benny programs. She was outfitted with a diamond-studded tiara and collar. She also gave birth to three puppies June 18, and they were given away to children.

In the beginning of the 1960s, Lady Greyhound continued to appear on television and at charity events and public parades. She received a number of awards, including Bide a Wee Medal, Outstanding Dog of 1961, and Queen of Transportation Week and became a chair of the pet division of the National Multiple Sclerosis Society. In 1961 she was a symbol for World Animal Day. She was able to appear all over the country because she traveled mainly by plane.

Lady Greyhound got a whole wardrobe with traveling coats and mufflers. She appeared in hospitals, gave "interviews" in radio and TV, and mixed with models in fashion events and department stores. In 1963 she attended the New York World's Fair where she had her own fashion show and handed out "pawtographs." In the next year’s Fair, she had 800 shows and had her own car and personal handler.

The next year the Greyhound Company decided to retire the original dog. They replaced her with two puppies that were based in Chicago and New York and never appeared at the same place on the same day. The company hired a new public relations agency, Aaron D. Cushman and Associates, which became Cushman Amberg Communications in 1997. In addition to charity and parade circuits, Lady Greyhound appeared in the opening of the company's new corporate headquarters in Chicago. In 1966, she appeared in the premiere of the Disney film The Ugly Dachshund.

The Lady Greyhound campaign ended in 1970.

Lady Greyhound was bred by Roy Lee of Clay Center, Kansas.
