= Feast of Saints Francis and Catherine =

Christian feast day

- Official name: Italian: San Francesco e Santa Caterina, patroni d'Italia, lit. 'Saint Francis and Saint Catherine, patrons of Italy'
- Observed by: Italy, and in general Christians of Italian ancestry
- Type: Religious, historical, cultural
- Significance: To honour Francis of Assisi and Catherine of Siena, patron saints of Italy and other locations
- Observances: Mass
- Date: 4 October
- Next time: 4 October 2026
- Frequency: Annual
- Related to: Feast of Creation, Creationtide

The patronal feast of Saint Francis and Saint Catherine (Italian: festa patronale di san Francesco e santa Caterina) (Note: Usually shortened as feast of Saints Francis and Catherine (Italian: festa dei santi Francesco e Caterina).) is a religious and civil celebration annually held on 4 October in Italy and other locations influenced by Christianity.

The Feast Day of Francis of Assisi marks the conclusion of the season of Creationtide in various Christian denominations that begins on the Feast of Creation (September 1).

== Patronage ==
Francis

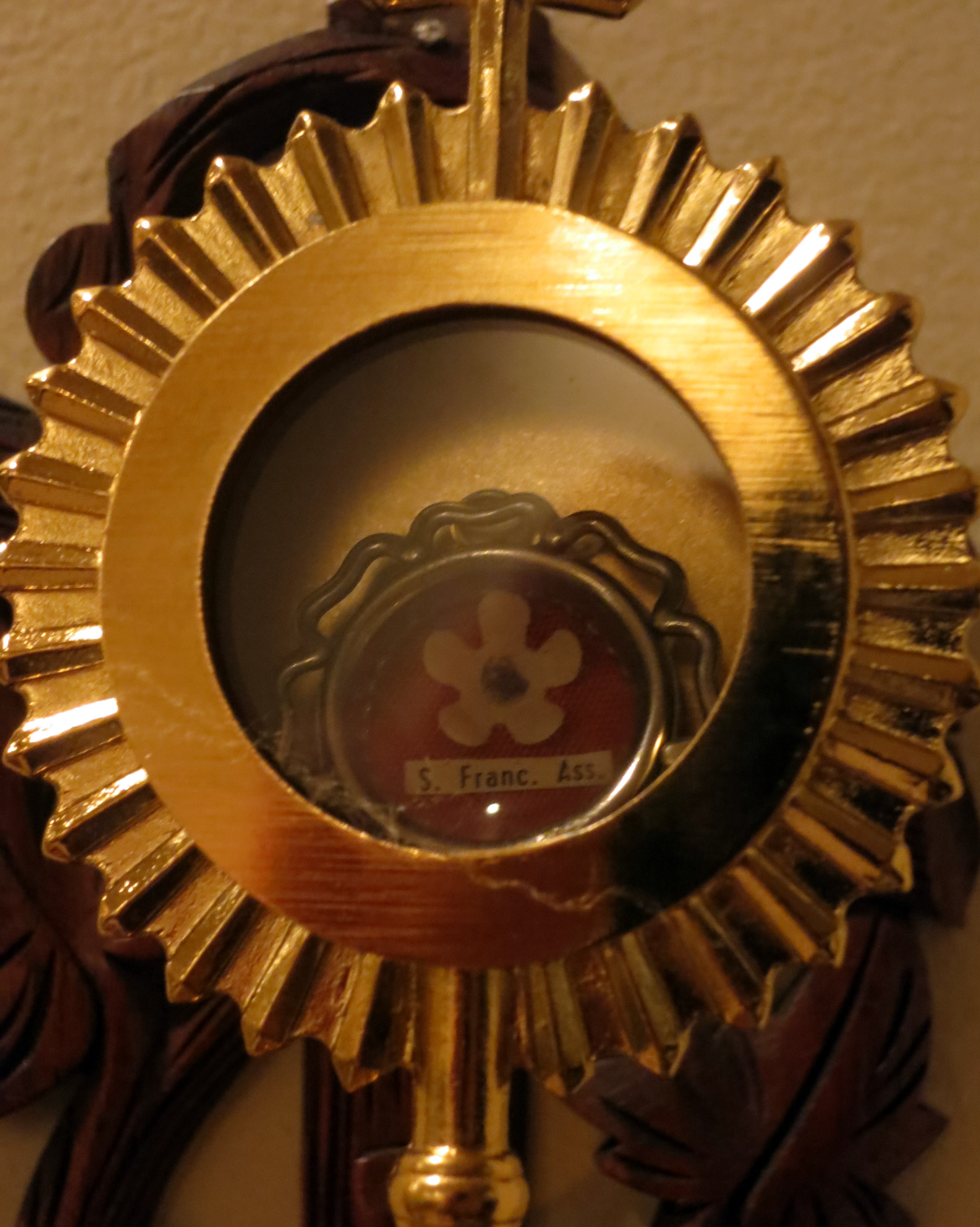
A relic of Francis of Assisi

On 18 June 1939, Pope Pius XII named Francis a joint patron saint of Italy along with Catherine of Siena with the apostolic letter "Licet Commissa". Pope Pius also mentioned the two saints in the laudative discourse he pronounced on 5 May 1949, in the Church of Santa Maria sopra Minerva.

Francis is the patron of animals and ecology. As such, he is the patron saint of the Laudato Si' Movement, a network that promotes the Franciscan ecological paradigm as outlined in the encyclical Laudato Si'.

He is also considered the patron against dying alone; against fire; patron of the Franciscan Order and Catholic Action; of families, peace and needleworkers, and a number of religious congregations.

He is the patron of many churches and other locations around the world, including: Italy; San Pawl il-Baħar, Malta; Freising, Germany; Lancaster, Lancashire; Kottapuram, India; Buhi, Camarines Sur, Philippines; General Trias, Philippines; San Francisco; Santa Fe, New Mexico; Colorado; Salina, Kansas; Metuchen, New Jersey; and Quibdó, Colombia.

On October 1, 2025, the Italian Parliament approved a law that (re) institutes 4th October as a national feast.

Catherine

In his decree of 13 April 1866, Pope Pius IX declared Catherine of Siena to be a co-patroness of Rome. On 18 June 1939 Pope Pius XII named her a joint patron saint of Italy along with Francis of Assisi.

On 1 October 1999, Pope John Paul II made her one of Europe's patron saints, along with Teresa Benedicta of the Cross and Bridget of Sweden. She is also the patroness of the historically Catholic American woman's fraternity, Theta Phi Alpha.

== Feast day ==
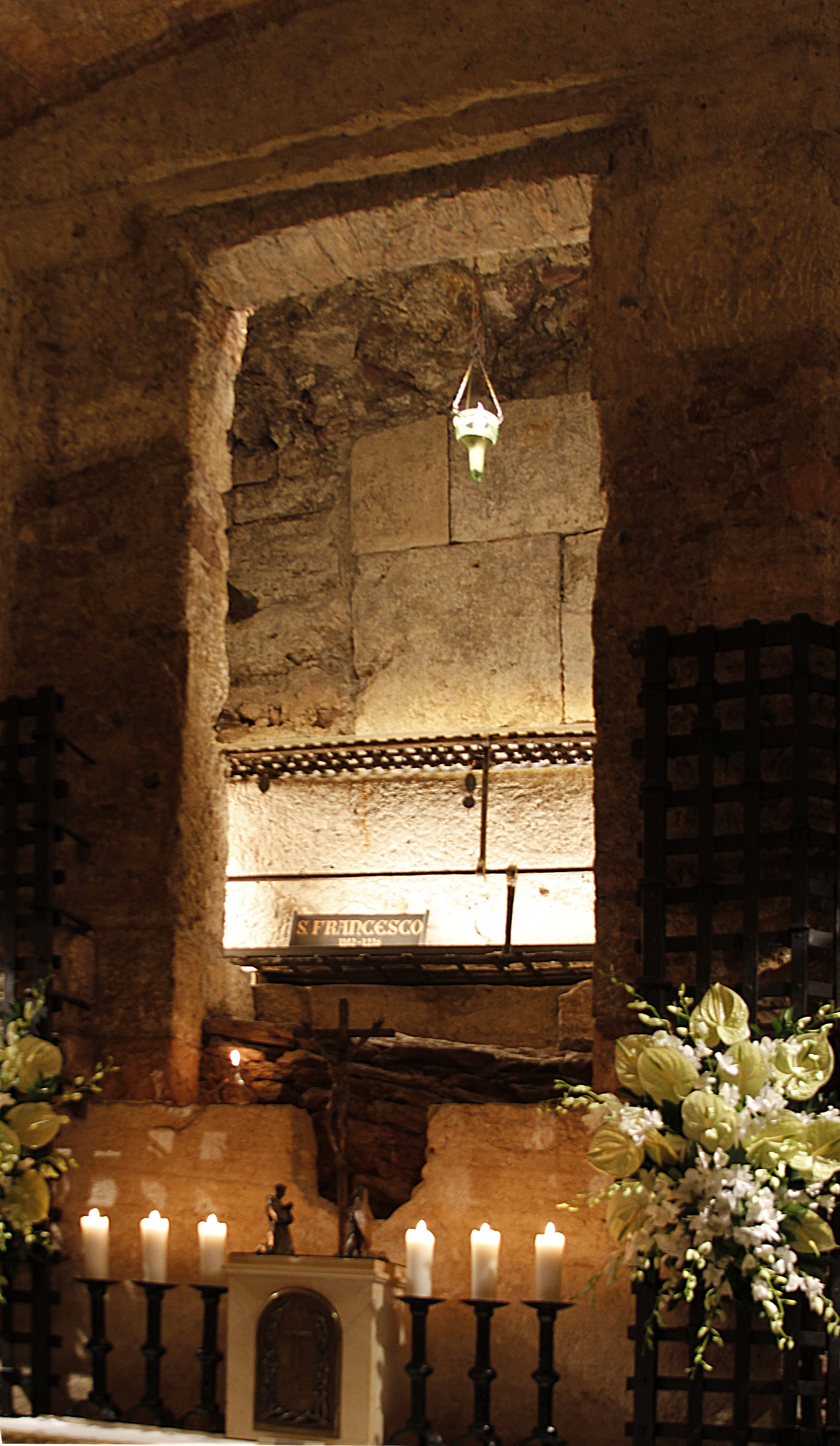
Francis' last resting place at Assisi

Francis' feast day is observed on 4 October. A secondary feast in honor of the stigmata received by Francis, celebrated on 17 September, was inserted in the General Roman Calendar in 1585 (later than the Tridentine calendar) and suppressed in 1604, but was restored in 1615. In the New Roman Missal of 1969, it was removed again from the General Calendar, as something of a duplication of the main feast on 4 October and left to the calendars of certain localities and of the Franciscan Order. Wherever the Tridentine Missal is used, however, the feast of the Stigmata remains in the General Calendar.

Francis is honoured in the Catholic Church, the Evangelical Lutheran Churches, the Anglican Communion (with a Lesser Festival in the Church of England, the Anglican Church of Canada, and the Episcopal Church USA) and the Old Catholic Churches, among other churches and religious communities on 4 October.

The Feast Day of Francis of Assisi marks the conclusion of the season of Creationtide in various Christian Churches that begins on the Feast of Creation (September 1). It is a popular practice on Francis' feast day for people to bring their pets and other animals to church for a blessing.

His patronal feast is also celebrated in Somerville, Massachusetts (United States); in Yucuaquín (El Salvador); in Bucalemu (Chile); in Huamachuco (Peru); in Panajachel, and San Francisco, Petén (Guatemala); in Tlalcilalcalpan and Valle de Bravo, Mexico; in Tonalá, Chiapas; in Acachuén and Tzintzuntzan, Michoacán (Mexico).

World Animal Day

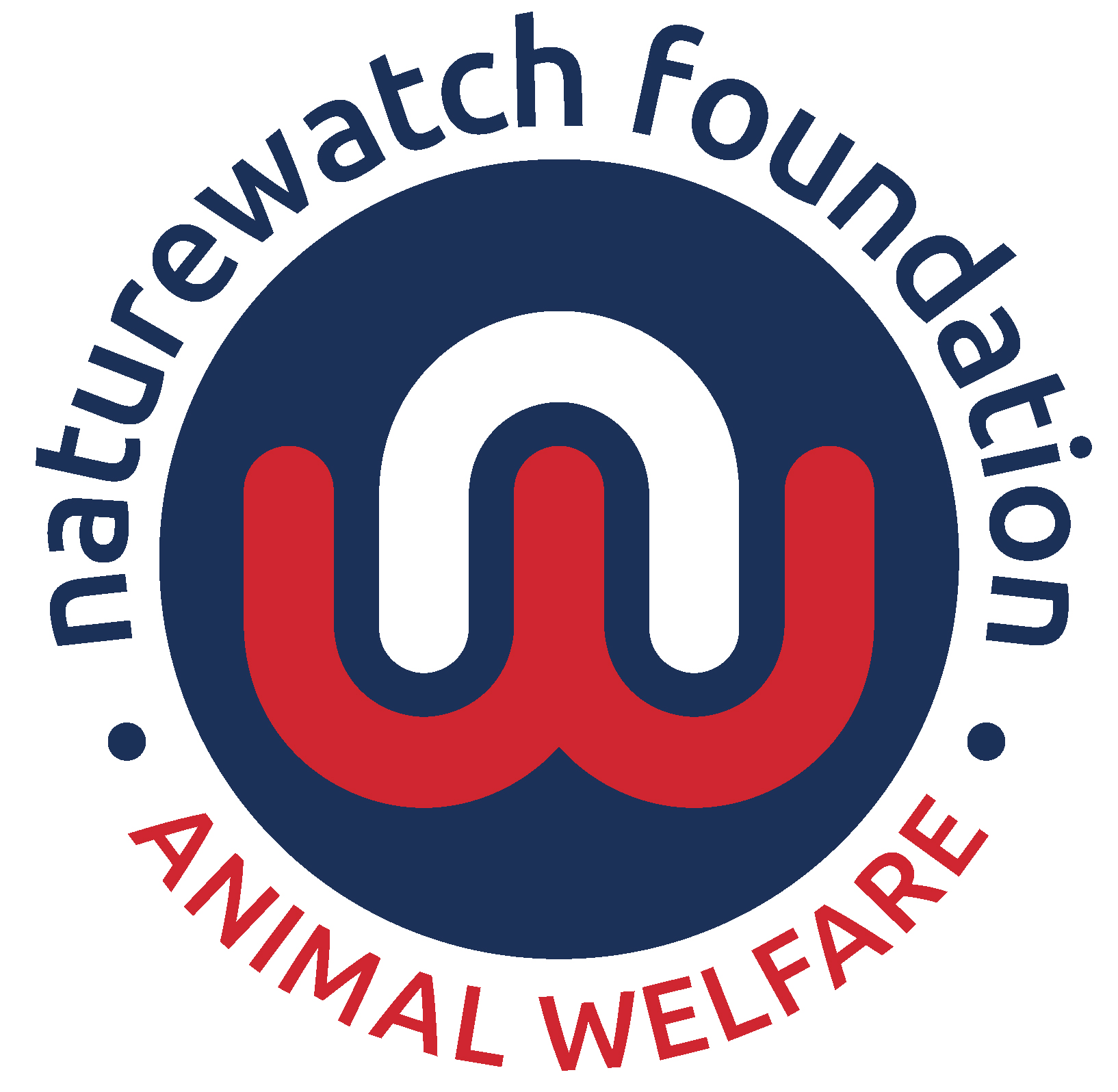
Logo for Naturewatch Foundation, a U.K based charity who Leads World Animal Day.

World Animal Day is an international day of action for animal rights and welfare celebrated annually on October 4, the feast day of Francis of Assisi, the patron saint of animals.

The World Animal Day movement is supported and endorsed by a number of celebrities, such as Anneka Svenska, Brian Blessed and Melanie C.

On the same date

On 4 October 1970, Pope Paul VI named Catherine a Doctor of the Church; this title was almost simultaneously given to Teresa of Ávila (27 September 1970), making them the first women to receive this honour.
