= Bark Mitzvah =

Jewish coming-of-age ceremony for a dog

Elvis Best "read" the Torah at his Bark Mitzvah in 2007.

A Bark Mitzvah (play on the words "Bar Mitzvah" and "bark") is an observance and celebration of a dog's coming of age, like the Jewish traditional Bar Mitzvah and Bat Mitzvah. The term has been in use since at least as early as 1958.

== Ceremony ==
The Bark Mitzvah is a self-styled tongue-in-cheek dog "coming of age" celebration occasionally held by Jews for their pets. It is not necessarily held in conjunction with a specific age, but can occur when the dog turns 13 months or 13 years of age, or in some cases, 13 dog years. During some Bark Mitzvahs, dogs wear a tallit, a ritual prayer shawl worn during Jewish religious services and ceremonies. A male dog wears a specific yarmulke, a thin skullcap.

== History ==
The first recorded Bark Mitzvah took place in Beverly Hills California in 1958. According to the Beverly Hills Courier, Max and Janet Salter celebrated the coming of age of their black cocker spaniel Duke of Windsor (Windy for short). Janet coined the term "Bark Mitzvah" on the invitations. Over the next 50 years, Max and Janet threw several more Bark Mitzvahs whenever one of their dogs turned 13.

In 1997, the first widely recorded Bark Mitzvah was celebrated, receiving scrutiny and disapproval from several rabbis. Rabbi Charles A. Kroloff of Westfield expressed his distaste for Bark Mitzvahs in a letter to the editor of The New York Times, describing the celebration as "nothing less than a desecration of a cherished Jewish tradition" and claiming that Bark Mitzvahs "degrade some of the central principles of Jewish life".

Although the idea of the Bark Mitzvah is frowned upon by some, the idea spread throughout the United States, and the celebrations have continued to occur. The ceremonies became increasingly popular on the East and West Coasts in the early 2000s. As a result, specialty pet stores and dog bakeries now offer special Bark Mitzvah party packages, party favors, and gifts. A Jewish coming-of-age song, "Max (The Bark Mitzvah Song)", won Larry Lesser the Best Humorous Song award at the 2021 New Mexico Music Awards.

== Notable Bark Mitzvahs ==
=== Admiral Rufus K. Boom Nadler ===
- Owner: Mark Nadler
- Place: Nadler Residence, New York City
- Date: December 2004
- Breed: Wheaten Terrier

Mark Nadler, a New York cabaret singer, hired party planners and bartenders to ensure a special evening for Admiral Boom. The event was complete with a Bark Mitzvah cake displaying Boom's photograph and his name written in English and Hebrew, satin yarmulkes with Boom's name and date printed inside, and a full buffet. Nadler requested that as a Bark Mitzvah gift to Boom, guests make a donation to the American Society for the Prevention of Cruelty to Animals. Coverage of the celebration was featured in The New York Times.

=== Colombo Rudy ===
- Owners: Edie and Ed Rudy
- Place: A local café, Aventura, Florida
- Date: October 14, 2005
- Breed: Poodle

Edie and Ed Rudy celebrated Columbo Rudy's coming of age at a local, outdoor Aventura café. Rabbi Rex Doberman signed a certificate from Congregation Beth Poodle congratulating the canine. Coverage of the event was featured on MSNBC.

== Other uses of the term ==
The term is also used for a dog-assisted literacy education project, one of several "bark mitzva" projects designed by a Lawrenceville, New Jersey conservative synagogue's religious school to teach children about tzedaka, the Jewish practice of charity.

== See also ==
- Blessing of animals
