= Fixed Cut-Off Date Animal Testing Policy =

In the European Union, the Fixed Cut-Off Date (FCOD) Animal Testing Policy relates to the testing of ingredients used in the manufacture of cosmetics, toiletries and household products. A company’s FCOD is a date after which none of the ingredients in its products has been tested on animals. The policy is recognised by animal welfare groups worldwide as the benchmark for cruelty free cosmetics / toiletries and household cleaning products because companies with a FCOD policy will not use any ingredient tested on animals after a specific date.

The FCOD Animal Testing Policy is endorsed by the Naturewatch Foundation and Cruelty Free International’s Leaping Bunny certification. Companies holding the Leaping Bunny cosmetics and personal care certification are encouraged to use a fixed cut-off date of 11 March 2013, the date on which a full European Union ban on animal testing for cosmetics came into force. Some companies are not endorsed by the Naturewatch Foundation even if they have a FCOD, because their parent company does not.

A Supplier Specific Boycott means a company has committed to only using suppliers that have no connection to animal testing at all and supply ingredients with a FCOD.
