= Christian views on environmentalism =

Christian views on environmentalism vary greatly amongst different Christians and Christian denominations.

Green Christianity is a broad field that encompasses Christian theological reflection on nature, liturgy, and spiritual practices centered on environmental issues, as well as Christian-based activism in the environmental movement. Within the activism arena, green Christianity refers to a diverse group of Christians who emphasize the biblical or theological basis for protecting, celebrating and partnering with the environment. The term indicates not a particular denomination but a shared territory of concern.

In the 21st century, and in response to the crises of nature and climate, many major Christian denominations recognise the Biblical calling for responsible—even sacrificial—care of, and partnership with the rest of God's Creation, primarily interpreted as referring to life on Earth. Some branches of Christianity have become environmentally aware relatively recently and such ideas may not be followed by all members and parishioners. According to some social science research, conservative Christians and members of the Christian right are typically less concerned about issues of environmentalism than the general public, and some fundamentalist Christians deny global warming and climate change.

The Christian liturgical calendar honors September 1 as the Feast of Creation and the subsequent time until October 4 as Creationtide.

== Roots of modern debate ==
The status of nature in Christianity has been hotly debated, primarily since Lynn Townsend White Jr. delivered a lecture on the subject to the American Academy of Arts and Sciences in 1966, which was subsequently published in the journal Science. In the article, White places blame for the modern ecological crisis on Christian beliefs perpetuated from the Middle Ages. His conclusion is primarily due to the dominance of the Christian worldview in the West, which is exploitative of nature in an unsustainable manner. He asserts that Judeo-Christians are anti-ecological, hostile towards nature, and imposed a division between humans and soul with an attitude to exploit nature in an unsustainable way, where people thought of themselves as separate from nature. This exploitative attitude, combined with technology in the industrial revolution, wreaked havoc on the ecology. Colonial forestry is a prime example of this destruction of ecology and native faiths. White concluded that Western Christianity bears a substantial "burden of guilt" for the contemporary environmental crisis.

The many nationally-based grassroots movements of green or eco-Christians, such as Eco-Church [England & Wales] EcoCongregation Scotland, and various organisations in mainland Europe and the global north would find themselves at odds with such a negative approach, preferring to see in the traditions and scriptures of mainstream Christianity a resource for discernment and spiritual resilience. The 'rule' of humanity, historically taken to justify domination, is then interpreted after the model of Jesus 'servant leadership', of a 'good shepherd' who lays down their life for the sheep [Matthew 20]. Attention to the semantic marginalization of creation in 20th century translations leads in practice to activism based on faith, rather than Christians finding themselves constrained or limited by Enlightenment or colonial views of human relation to fellow creatures.

== Basic beliefs ==
Christianity has a long historical tradition of reflection on nature and human responsibility, while historically having a strong tendency toward anthropocentrism. It should be said that the spirituality of Christians in indigenous cultures sees creation without this polarization of human and other creatures. While some Christians favor a more biocentric approach, Catholic officials and others seek to retain an emphasis on humanity while incorporating environmental concerns within a framework of Creation Care. Christian environmentalists emphasize the ecological responsibilities of all Christians as partners and guardians of all life on God's earth.

Beginning with the verse Genesis 1:26–28, God instructs humanity to manage the creation in particular ways.

"And God blessed them, and God said unto them, Be fruitful, and multiply, and replenish the earth, and subdue it: and have dominion over the fish of the sea, and over the fowl of the air, and over every living thing that moveth upon the earth."

Adam's early purpose was to give care to the Garden of Eden:

"And the LORD God took the man, and put him into the garden of Eden to dress it and to keep it." (Genesis 2:15)

Green Christians point out that the biblical emphasis is on safeguarding, not ownership – that the earth remains the Lord's (Psalms 24:1) and does not belong to its human inhabitants. Leviticus 25:23 states:

"The land must not be sold permanently because the land is mine, and you are but aliens and my tenants."

As a result of the teachings which emphasis relationship, partnership and safeguarding, Christian environmentalists oppose policies and practices that threaten the health or survival of the planet. Of particular concern to such Christians are the current widespread reliance on non-renewable resources, habitat destruction, pollution, and all other factors that contribute to climate change or otherwise threaten the health of the ecosystem. Due to these positions, many Christian environmentalists have broken ties with conservative political leaders.

== Historical thought ==
Nature and environmental thought have been intrinsic in the church since the time of David. Ancient thought was an early precursor to modern ecological thought and that thinking provides a holistic view of the world, from human experience to ecological values. Much of the Bible, from the psalms to Jesus' parables, involve partaking in the beauty of nature. This was reflected by early monastic tradition, which involved living in solitude and embracing nature. Monastics set the standard for the rest of the church, and even today monasteries exemplify sustainable living.Fr. John Klassen, O.S.B., the monk who formerly served as Abbott of the largest monastery in the United States, states, “It is precisely monastic stability which unites the spiritual journey with a profound commitment to environmental stewardship.” In recent times ecological thought has come to the forefront of Christian thinking as evidenced by Laudato Si' and other documents, but these thoughts merely reflect the ecological attitude that has pervaded all of Church history.

== Beliefs by Christian denomination ==
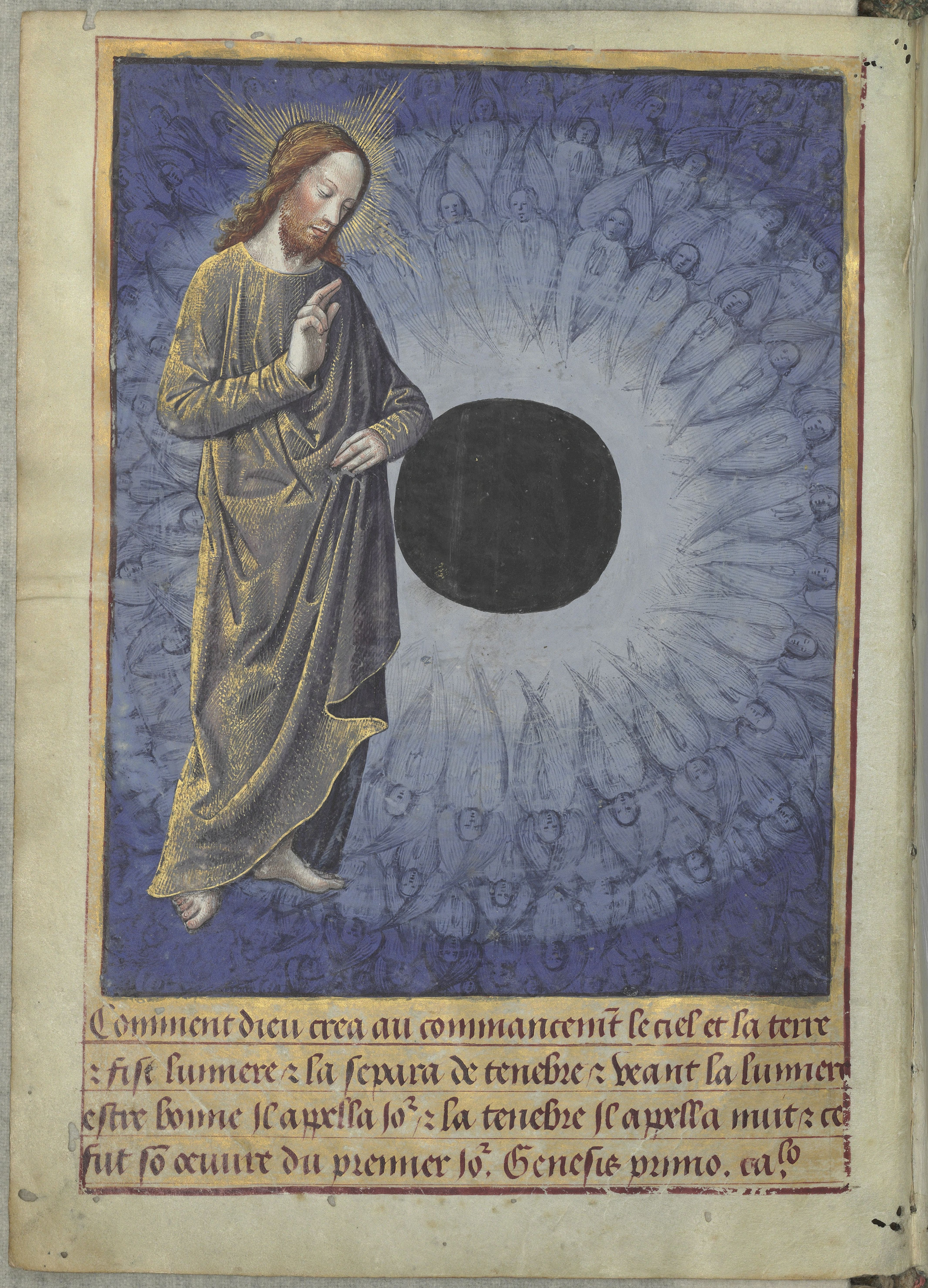
The first day of creation, by Jean Colombe from the Heures de Louis de Laval (see Louis de Laval)

=== Anglican Communion ===
The Anglican Communion (including the Episcopal Church) has strong beliefs about the need for environmental awareness and actions. Reducing carbon footprints and moving toward sustainable living are priorities. The British have played a leading role in the modern environmentalist movement, and Prince Philip, Duke of Edinburgh created the Alliance of Religions and Conservation, which from 1995 to 2019 raised awareness of environmental issues and global warming in religious communities. From 2024, the Anglican Church has had an environmental programme which supports the Anglican Communion Environmental Network including initiatives such as Eco Church with network A Rocha.

=== Eastern Orthodox Churches ===
Patriarch Bartholomew I of Constantinople, has voiced support for aspects of the environmentalist movement. Bartholomew I views climate change as a spiritual and ethical issue, stating that addressing it requires global collaboration and drastic lifestyle changes, as it affects everyone and cannot be ignored. He goes so far as to call the whole world a sacrament, and emphasizes the liturgy as the link between the natural world and God. Fr. John Chryssavgis serves as advisor to the Ecumenical Patriarch, currently Bartholomew I, on environmental issues such as global warming.

Orthodox Christian theology is generally more mystical than the traditions which developed in the Christian West, emphasizing the renewal and transfiguration of the whole creation through Christ's redemptive work. Many Eastern Christian monastics, such as those at Mount Athos, are known for cultivating unusually close relationships with wild animals.

=== Oriental Orthodox Churches ===
==== Armenian Apostolic Church ====
The late Catholicos Karekin I stated that the Armenian Apostolic Church is committed to the defense of creation because harming the gift of God is a sin when a man must care for it. Under Catholicos Karekin II, the Armenian Church produced a seven-year ecological action plan.

==== Ethiopian Orthodox 'Tewahedo' Church ====
Traditionally, Ethiopian Orthodox monasteries and some churches have preserved small sacred forests around their buildings in memory of the Garden of Eden. This has allowed many endangered species to survive where their habitat has otherwise been lost.

=== Evangelical Lutheran Churches ===
Evangelical Lutherans approach environmentalism with a deep-rooted theological framework that emphasizes the biblical mandate for stewardship, the interconnectedness of all creation, and the redemptive purpose of God's work in the world. By integrating these principles into their faith practice, Lutherans strive to fulfill their calling to care for God's creation and promote sustainable living practices for the flourishing of all life on earth.

Major Lutheran Synods acknowledge that the Bible calls to care for God's creation, and that the dominion that God gave his human creatures has often been abused to the detriment of creation: loss of biodiversity, resource depletion, environmental damage, etc. Christians are called to live according to God's wisdom in creation with his other creatures and as such, sustainable living is needed.

Lutherans draw upon Genesis 2:15 and Psalm 24:1 (see above) which emphasize the importance of respecting and safeguarding God's creation. Additionally, Lutherans frequently cite passages such as Romans 8:19–22, which speaks of creation eagerly awaiting its redemption from bondage to decay. This passage underscores the interconnectedness of humanity and the natural world, highlighting the shared destiny of all creation in God's redemptive plan. It prompts believers to work towards the restoration and reconciliation of all things, including the environment, in anticipation of God's ultimate renewal of creation.

In the Lutheran theology, the concept of vocation plays a significant role in shaping attitudes towards care of Creation. Martin Luther emphasized the idea that every Christian has a vocation or calling, and this includes responsibilities towards the care of creation. Thus, for Lutherans, environmental stewardship is not merely an optional virtue but an essential aspect of faithful Christian living.

=== Reformed (Continental Reformed, Presbyterian, and Congregationalist) Churches ===
Care for Creation remains a deep commitment for many Presbyterians. Many mid-twentieth century progressive conservationists were Presbyterian or raised in the Presbyterian faith.

Naturalist John Muir and landscape artist William Keith were raised in staunch Calvinist Presbyterian homes in Scotland during the nineteenth century. With Presbyterian photographer Carleton Watkins, they built public support for the US national parks. Their reformed spiritual upbringing informed their ideas about nature and that humanity's role was as God's keeper of the land.

Calvinist theology, which emphasizes God's sovereignty over creation, inspired such environmentalists to see God's glory in nature. Seeing that Calvinists, like Presbyterians, believe in God's sustaining power, they consider that the Divine intimately relates to the created order through providence. In his Institutes of the Christian Religion, John Calvin further taught that nature acted as the most apparent medium of God's revelation outside of scripture. The Westminster Confession of Faith echoes this teaching in the first chapter on holy scripture and the fourth on creation.

=== Quakerism ===
The Religious Society of Friends, or Quakers, has a history of environmental concern. Inspired by the testimony of stewardship, Friends have sought to practice ethical economics and creation care since the earliest days of the Society's founding. Numerous organizations and initiatives unite Quakers in the cause of environmental sustainability.

Quaker Earthcare Witness, founded in 1987 as the Friends Committee on Unity with Nature, is an organization which calls attention to the current ecological crises. Based on Quaker convictions, the organization argues that the deeper cause of environmental problems has resulted from a more profound spiritual crisis of human separation from the land.

The Earth Quaker Action Team (EQAT) is a non-violent protest organization that engages in the fight for ecojustice. Energy companies that they view as ecologically harmful are often the targets of opposition. For example, in 2016, they pressured Philadelphia-based power company PECO to utilize solar energy. In 2010, Bank Like Appalachia Matters (BLAM!) protested for the PNC Bank to stop financing industries engaged in mountaintop coal mining. By 2015, the bank ceased financing such enterprises.

=== Roman Catholic Church ===
Catholic environmental activists have found support in teachings by Pope Paul VI (Octogesima adveniens, #21) and Pope John Paul II (e.g., the encyclical Centesimus annus, #37–38).

The National Conference of Catholic Bishops (NCCB) issued Renewing the Earth: An Invitation to Reflection and Action on Environment in Light of Catholic Social Teaching in 1991.The bishops also set up the Environmental Justice Program, a program that included offing small grants in support of environmental initiatives.

Some modern thinkers cite how the universal, family aspects of the Church give it an unbiased perspective on ecological issues.

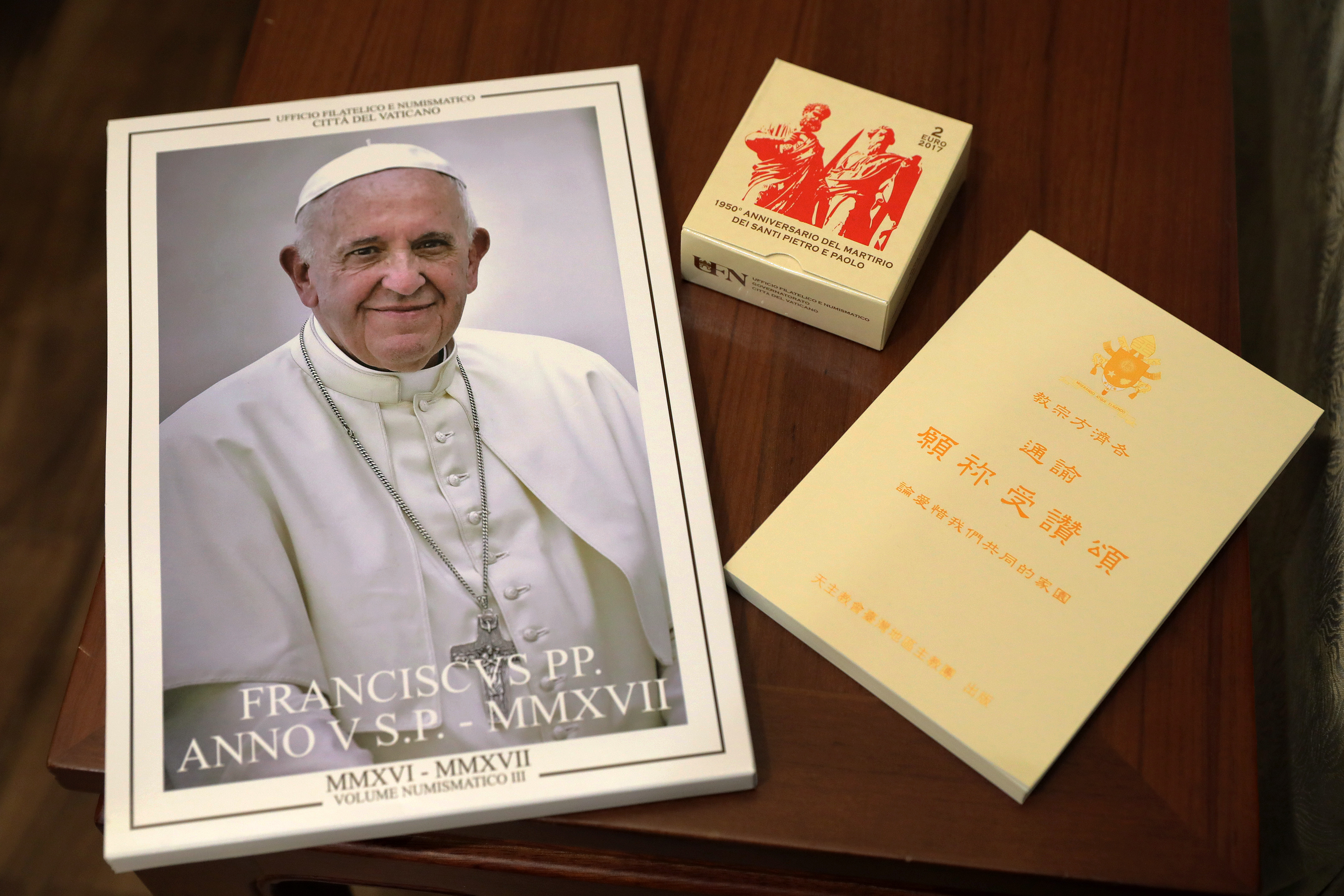
Laudato si' (Traditional Chinese version)

Pope Francis issued in 2015 the first encyclical letter exclusively on environmental concerns, entitled Laudato si' (Be Praised). In it, he encourages humans to protect the Earth. He addresses the encyclical to "every person on this planet”, expanding the audience that encyclicals historically were written for. He endorses climate action and has made cases on Christian environmentalism several times. "Take good care of creation. St. Francis wanted that. People occasionally forgive, but nature never does. If we don't care for the environment, there's no way of getting around it."

During a lecture at the University of Molise in July 2014, Francis characterized environmental damage as "one of the greatest challenges of our times". In his letter he also acknowledges some diversity within earlier Catholic thought: "Some committed and prayerful Christians, with the excuse of realism and pragmatism, tend to ridicule expressions of concern for the environment [while others] are passive: they choose not to change their habits and thus become inconsistent".

=== Mormonism ===
The Latter Day Saint movement has a complex relationship with environmental concerns, involving not only religion but politics and economics. Mormon environmentalists find theological reasons for stewardship and conservationism through biblical and additional scriptural references including a passage from the Doctrine and Covenants: "And it pleaseth God that he hath given all these things unto man; for unto this end were they made to be used, with judgment, not to excess, neither by extortion". In terms of environmentally friendly policies, The Church of Jesus Christ of Latter-day Saints (LDS Church) has some history of conservationist policies for their meetinghouses and other buildings. The church first placed solar panels on a church meetinghouse in the Tuamotu Islands in 2007. In 2010, the church unveiled five LEED-certified meetinghouse prototypes that are being used for future meetinghouse designs around the world.

While the LDS Church has implemented some environmentally friendly policies, not all members of the church identify as environmentalists or support the environmentalism movement. A 2023 survey found that less than half of LDS Church members believe that climate change is caused by human activity and only one in ten view it as a crisis.

=== Presbyterian Churches ===
The mainline Presbyterian Church (USA) has been an outspoken supporter of modern environmental causes. In 2018, it approved a policy for combating environmental racism. Other initiatives include establishing Presbyterian Earth Care Congregations and Green Leaf Seal camps, which involve many member churches and conference centers across the United States.

The church's 2010 Earth Care Pledge summarizes critical aspects of creation restoration in four resolutions: worship, education, energy-efficient church facilities, and community outreach for environmental justice. Denominational resources on earth-care for local congregations stay available for distribution.

=== Seventh-day Adventists ===
The Seventh-day Adventist church has stated its commitment to environmental stewardship as well as taking action to avoid the dangers of climate change. Its official statement advocates a "simple, wholesome lifestyle" that does not chase consumerism and the resultant waste. It calls for a "lifestyle reformation ... based on respect for nature, restraint in using the world's resources, reevaluating one's needs, and reaffirming the dignity of created life."

In 2010, the Loma Linda University Center for Biodiversity and Conservation Studies was introduced to address the comparative lack of environmental concern among Christians in education, scientific research, and general awareness.

=== Baptist Churches ===
Southern Baptists were among the first Christian groups in the United States to campaign for government control of pollution in the late 1960s. Concerns about possible worship of nature led to a move away from this campaign in the 1980s. In 2008, several pastors revised their views and published a statement on the duty of Christians to care for the environment.

The Southern Baptist Environment and Climate Initiative is an independent coalition of Southern Baptist pastors, leaders, and laypersons who believe in stewardship that is both biblically rooted and intellectually informed, and the Convention has published positions on scripturally-mandated stewardship of the environment.

=== Methodist Churches ===
The Free Methodist Church teaches that "Scripture reveals that God is the Creator" and that to "love God implies caring for his creation."

The United Methodist Church believes in the need for environmental stewardship. For Christians, the idea of sustainability flows directly from the biblical call to human beings to be stewards of God's creation. Through various initiatives and programs, the United Methodist Church encourages its members to engage in environmental stewardship practices. This includes supporting sustainable agriculture, advocating for environmental policies, and promoting energy conservation within church facilities.

=== Evangelical Free and Nondenominational churches ===
As the scientific community has presented evidence of climate change, some members of the evangelical community and other Christian groups have emphasized the need for Christian ecology, often employing the phrase "creation care" to indicate the religious basis of their project. Some of these groups are now interdenominational, having begun from an evangelical background and then gained international and interdenominational prominence with increased public awareness of environmental issues. Organizations that have their roots in the evangelical Christian community include A Rocha, the Evangelical Climate Initiative, and the Evangelical Environmental Network.

Some prominent members of the Christian right political faction broke with the Bush administration and other conservative politicians over the issue of climate change. Christianity Today endorsed the McCain-Lieberman Bill, which was eventually defeated by the Republican Congress and opposed by Bush. According to the magazine, "Christians should make it clear to governments and businesses that we are willing to adapt our lifestyles and support steps towards changes that protect our environment." The increasing Christian support for strong positions on climate change and related issues has been referred to as "the greening of evangelicals." Many Christians have expressed dissatisfaction with leadership they feel places the interests of big businesses over Christian doctrine.

In reaction to the rise of environmentalism, many conservative evangelical Christians have embraced climate change denialism or maintained a neutral stance due to the lack of internal consensus on such issues. The Cornwall Alliance is a Christian right group that promotes free-market environmentalism. The National Association of Evangelicals has stated that "global warming is not a consensus issue" and is internally divided on the Christian response to climate change.

In November 2022, a survey conducted by the Pew Forum on Religion and Public Life, found that evangelicals were the most skeptical religious group regarding global warming. 17% of Evangelical did not believe that there is solid evidence showing that the Earth is warming. 32% of Evangelical did believe that there was evidence because of human activity, but 36% did believe that warming was due to natural patterns. 53% of the total U.S. population does believe that the Earth is warming because of human influences and 66% of unaffiliated Americans believe that global warming due to human impacts is real.

=== Secular Thought ===
In recent times secular thinking has grown to embrace religion as an aspect of environmentalism. Some even think that sustainability itself should be a religion. Multiple studies have been published suggesting that religion leads to increased participation in sustainable practices but does not guarantee it.

== See also ==
- Catholic Earthcare Australia
- Christian vegetarianism
- Ecojesuit
- Ecotheology
- The Green Bible
- Pollution and the Death of Man
- Presbyterian Church (USA) Carbon Neutral Resolution
