= Mark Nadler =

American musician and comedian

- Born: Waterloo, Iowa, U.S.
- Education: Interlochen Arts Academy
- Occupations: Cabaret performer; actor; comedic pianist
- Website: www.marknadler.com

Mark Nadler is a New York City-based cabaret performer, actor, and comedic pianist. He has been described as "one of New York's most acclaimed singer/pianists" and a "virtuoso" of classical piano.

== Early life and education ==
Nadler was born and raised in Waterloo, Iowa. He took an interest in Broadway musicals from a young age, and was a fan of Danny Kaye, Mahalia Jackson, Jimmy Durante, the Marx Brothers, and Bugs Bunny. At the age of ten, he began performing professionally at the Long Straw Saloon in Cedar Falls, Iowa. As the gay son of Jewish immigrants, he felt out of place in the American Midwest. He studied at the Interlochen Arts Academy in 1981 before moving to Manhattan at age 17.

== Career ==
Nadler frequently has collaborated with singer KT Sullivan. He has written and performed in dozens of touring, Broadway, and off-Broadway productions, as well as on television programs. Some of his more notable productions include American Rhapsody in 1999, an off-Broadway revue based on George Gershwin that won the Manhattan Association of Cabarets Award for Outstanding Musical Revue and was nominated for a Drama Desk Award and two Lucille Lortel Awards; Red Light, an "opera in honky-tonk" co-written with Dawn Hampton, which also won a MAC Award; Tschaikovsky (and Other Russians), performed at the Algonquin Hotel and the American Conservatory Theater, among other venues, which won the 2003 Bistro Award; and Russian on the Side, based on the Ira Gershwin/Kurt Weill patter song "Tschaikowsky (and Other Russians)", which played the Edinburgh Festival Fringe and the Marines Memorial Theater in San Francisco, California.

== Personal life ==
In 2004, Nadler and his partner hosted a "Bark Mitzvah" for their wheaten terrier, Admiral Rufus K. Boom, as a commentary on the frivolity and excess of Bar Mitzvah engagements at which Nadler had performed earlier in his career.
