= World Animal Day =

International day celebrated on October 4

- World Animal Day logo in English
- Official name: World Animal Day
- Type: International
- Date: October 4
- Next time: October 4, 2027
- Frequency: annual
- First time: March, 1925
- Related to: Feast of Saint Francis; Season of Creation

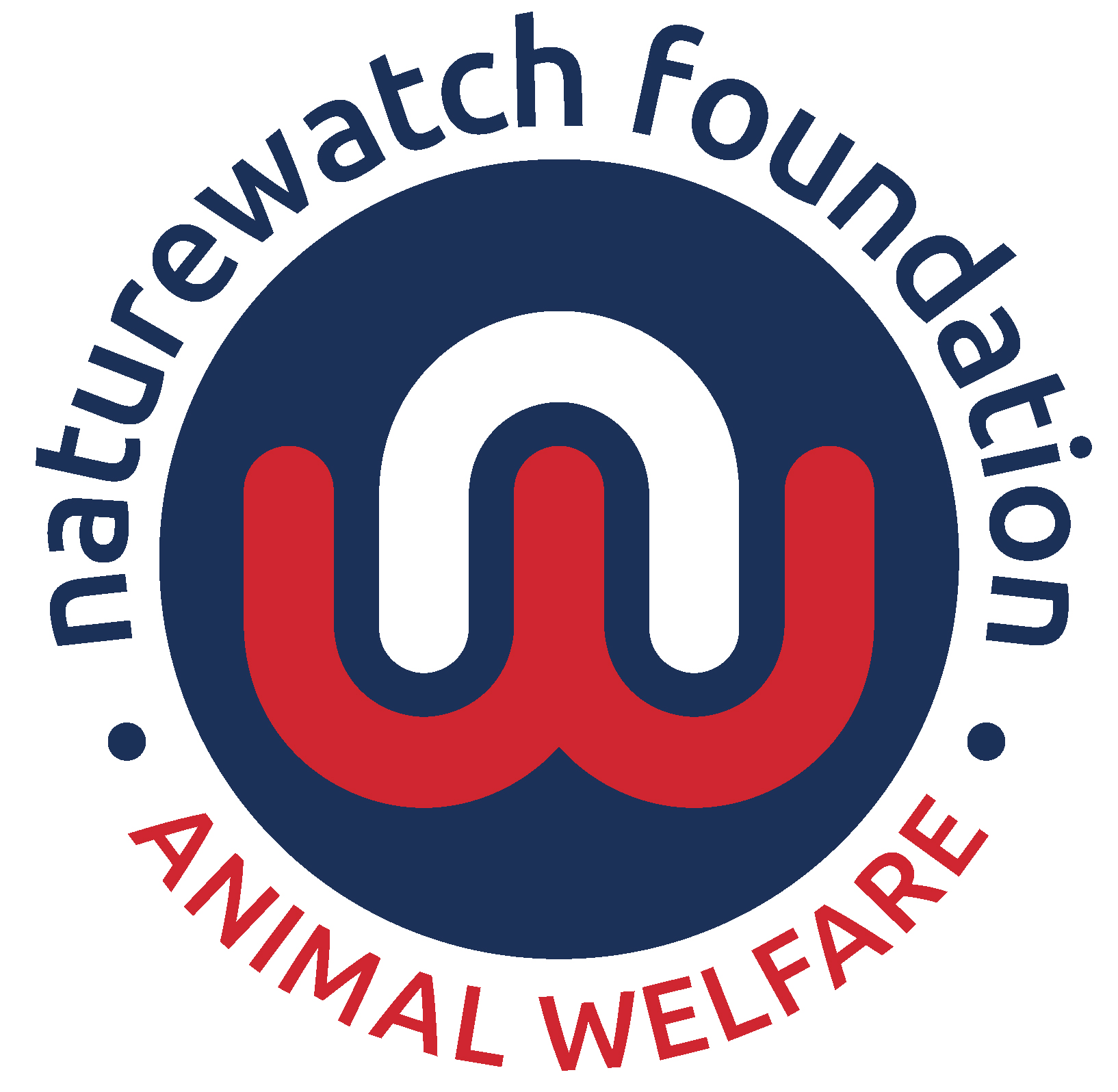
Logo for Naturewatch Foundation, a U.K based charity who Leads World Animal Day.

World Animal Day is an international day of action for animal welfare celebrated annually on October 4, the feast day of Francis of Assisi, the patron saint of animals.

The World Animal Day movement is supported and endorsed by a number of celebrities.

== History ==
Dutch children's drawing competition on the occasion of World Animal Day 1969

World Animal Day, was originated by cynologist Heinrich Zimmermann. He organized the first World Animal Day on March 24, 1925, at the Sport Palace in Berlin, Germany. Over 5,000 people attended this first event. The activity was originally scheduled for October 4, to align with the feast day of Saint Francis of Assisi, patron saint of animals. However, the venue was not available on that day. The event was then moved to October 4 for the first time in 1929.

Every year, Zimmermann worked tirelessly on the promotion of World Animal Day. Finally, in May 1931 at a congress of the International Animal Protection Congress in Florence, Italy, his proposal to make October 4 as World Animal Day universal was unanimously accepted and adopted as a resolution.

It is sometimes cited, incorrectly, that World Animal Day started in 1931 at the convention of ecologists in Florence, Italy, who wished to highlight the plight of endangered species.

In 1948, Australian celebrations were organised by the RSPCA. According to The Examiner, the construction of a boarding home for dogs was scheduled and a donation had been received from the L.G.R.C. Since 2002, The Finnish Association of Animal Protection Associations (SEY) has organized various events during the Animal Week and distributed material to schools. On October 27, 2006, the Polish parliament adopted a resolution on the establishment of 4 October as Animal Day.

In Argentina, this day has been observed on April 29 since 1908, promoted by Ignacio Lucas Albarracín, president of the Animal Protection Association of Buenos Aires. Coincidentally Albarracín would die on the same date in 1926, making it a day to also pay tribute to him for pioneering the animal's rights movement in the country.

Since 2003, World Animal Day has been coordinated by UK based animal welfare charity, Naturewatch Foundation with a new World Animal Day website launched for the 2023 celebration.

World Animal Day concludes the Season of Creation that begins on the Feast of Creation (September 1). Later Naturewatch Foundation promotes fundraising initiatives including ‘Donate a Dinner’, encouraging support for local animal rescue centres.

Many countries such as Bolivia, Bahamas, China, and Colombia have community driven annual events to promote the global celebration.

== Annual themes ==
Starting in 2022, Naturewatch Foundation has included specific themes in the day's celebration.

- 2022: Shared Planet
- 2023: Great or small, love them all
- 2024: The world is their home too
- 2025: Save the animals, Save the planet
- 2026: See the World Through Their Eyes

== See also ==
- Blessing of animals – Ceremonial blessing of companion, agricultural, or working animals
- International Primate Day – Annual observance event
- Monkey Day – Unofficial international holiday
- World Wildlife Day – UN observed day to highlight Convention of Endangered Species of Fauna and Flora
