= Friends of the Earth (EWNI) =

Environmental organisation in England, Wales and Northern Ireland

Friends of the Earth England, Wales and Northern Ireland
- Formation: 1971
- Founder: Graham Searle
- Founded at: England
- Legal status: Trust / Limited Company
- Headquarters: 1st Floor; The Printworks; 139 Clapham Road; London; SW9 0HP
- Chief Executive: Asad Rehman
- Parent organisation: Friends of the Earth
- Website: friendsoftheearth.uk

Friends of the Earth England, Wales and Northern Ireland (also known as FoE EWNI) is one of 70 national groups around the world which make up the Friends of the Earth network of environmental organisations. It is usually referred to as just 'Friends of the Earth' within its home countries.

== History ==
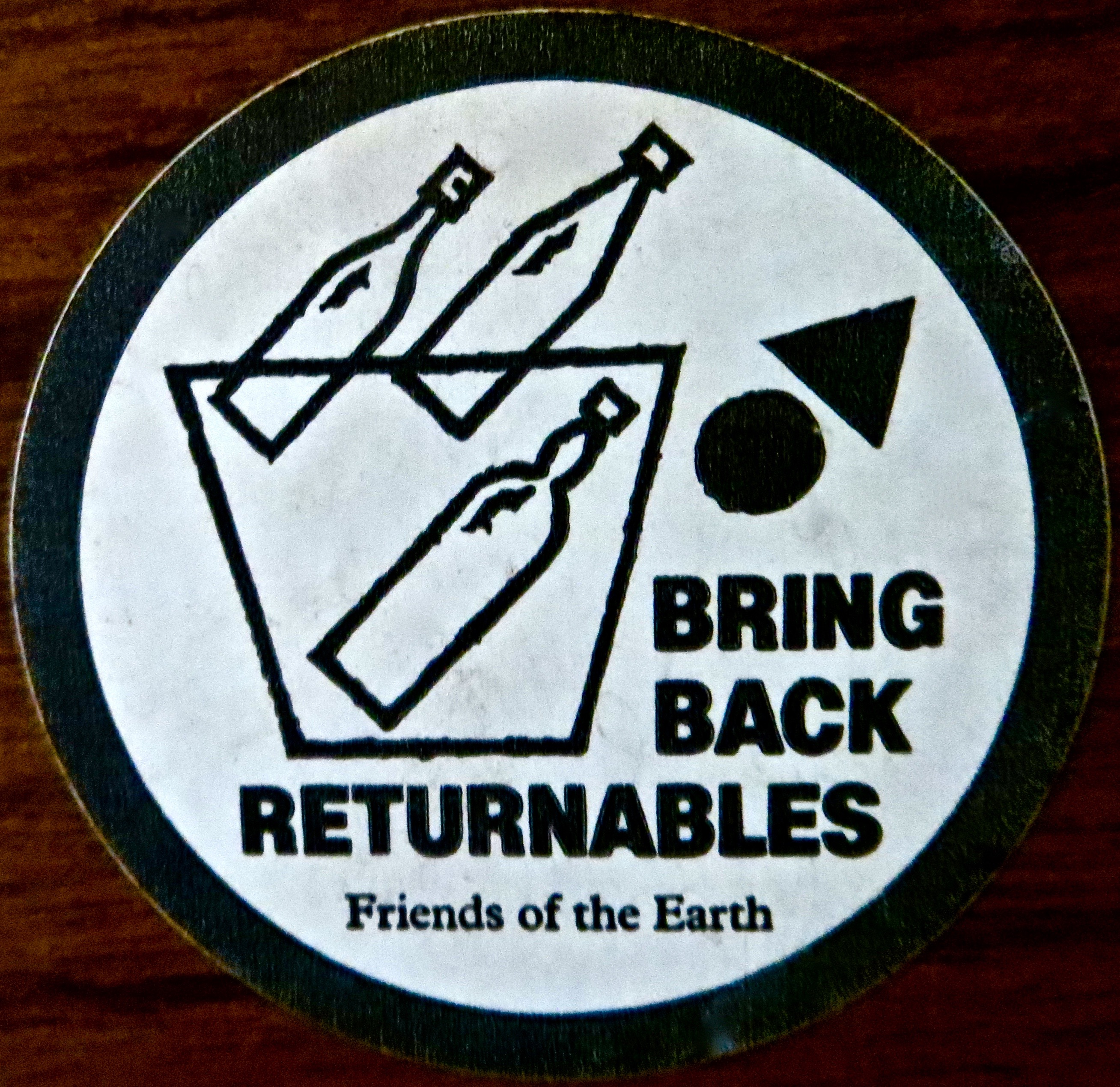
A sticker used as part of the Schweppes campaign

Friends of the Earth in England was founded in 1971, two years after the group was first founded in San Francisco in 1969. Its first leader was Graham Searle, a former vice president of the National Union of Students. In 1975, Searle documented the New Zealand Beech Forest Controversy for Friends of the Earth during a year's sabbatical in that country. One of the early campaigns of the newly founded organisation was to dump almost 1000 glass bottles in front of the HQ of soft drinks giant Schweppes in Connaught House, London in protest at the company's policy of having non-returnable bottles. Other initial activities focused on opposing an open cast copper mine in the Snowdonia National Park (which led to an early victory when this was stopped) and on work to save endangered species. This grew into the world-wide 'Save the Whale' campaigns by FoE, Greenpeace and others.

Campaigning for safe energy was also an early issue, in which FoE EWNI was supported by US expert Amory Lovins. Opposition to nuclear power and support for renewable energy was a core campaign issue which developed into work on climate change – now in 2020 the central theme for FoE EWNI work.

Local action across the UK is a distinguishing feature of FoE EWNI, which has a network of licensed 'local groups' that enjoy a degree of autonomy over the issues on which they work. Soon after the launch in 1971 there were eight local branches and by 1976 there were 140. In 1978 groups in Scotland split off to form their own organisation, FoE Scotland. In 1980 FoE had 250 groups and 17,000 registered supporters, but the growth of the peace movement and CND from 1980–84 saw support move away and FoE downsizing to 12 staff.

In 1984 Jonathan Porritt, a former teacher and chairman of the Ecology Party (renamed the Green Party in 1985), became the director of the organisation. Porritt left in 1990, by which time membership had grown to 226,000 and staff numbers from 12 to over 100.

The next executive director was Dave Gee, followed by Charles Secrett who held the position till 2003. Between 2003 and 2008, FoE EWNI's executive director was Tony Juniper who in 2019 became Chair of Natural England. From 2006–2008 FoE played a lead role in the campaign (known as the 'Big Ask') for a UK Climate Act, which became law in 2008. Andy Atkins was executive director from 2008-2015, widening the scope of campaigns to include more biodiversity, with the establishment of a National Pollinator Strategy a key campaign highlight. From 2015–2020 Craig Bennett was Chief Executive, who left to become Director of the Wildlife Trusts. From January 2021 until July 2024, Miriam Turner and Hugh Knowles were Co-CEOs. Jamie Peters was appointed Chief Executive (Interim) in July 2024. Asad Rehman took up post as Chief Executive in August 2025.

== Structure and funding ==
FoE EWNI has a dual structure, comprising a trust, which is a registered charity, and a limited company, which carries out political campaigning – UK legislation limits how far a charity may campaign.

Total income for Friends of the Earth Ltd. for the year ending May 2019 was £11.2m of which about £8m was a grant from the FoE Charitable Trust.
