= A Rocha =

International environmental organization

- Predecessor: A Rocha Trust
- Founded: 13 December 1983; 42 years ago
- Founder: Miranda and Peter Harris
- Type: environmental NGO network
- Headquarters: London, UK
- Origins: Constituted in the UK
- Region served: Worldwide
- Product: community-based conservation projects
- International chair: Soohwan Park
- Key people: Ed Walker (Executive Director, ARI) • Andy Atkins (CEO, A Rocha UK) • Rev Dave Bookless (Head of Theology, ARI)
- Revenue: GBP £750,000 (2022)
- Employees: 144 in 2017(FTE)
- Volunteers: 841 in 2017
- Website: arocha.org

A Rocha is an international network of environmental organizations with Christian ethos. A Rocha means "the rock" in Portuguese.

== History ==
A Rocha International was founded in Portugal in 1983. The A Rocha Worldwide Covenant defines the rights and responsibilities of each A Rocha entity to the others.

As of 2024, A Rocha is working in over 20 countries: Australia, Canada, Czech Republic, France, Ghana, India, Kenya, Lebanon, Netherlands, New Zealand/Aotearoa, Nigeria, Peru, Portugal, South Africa, Sweden, Switzerland, Uganda, United Kingdom, and United States. There are ongoing conversations with other potential groups around the world, particularly in East and Southeast Asia.

A Rocha has five core commitments: Christian, Conservation, Community, Collaboration, and Cultural diversity.

== Work ==
A Rocha claims to aim to protect the environment through local, community-based conservation, scientific research, and environmental education.

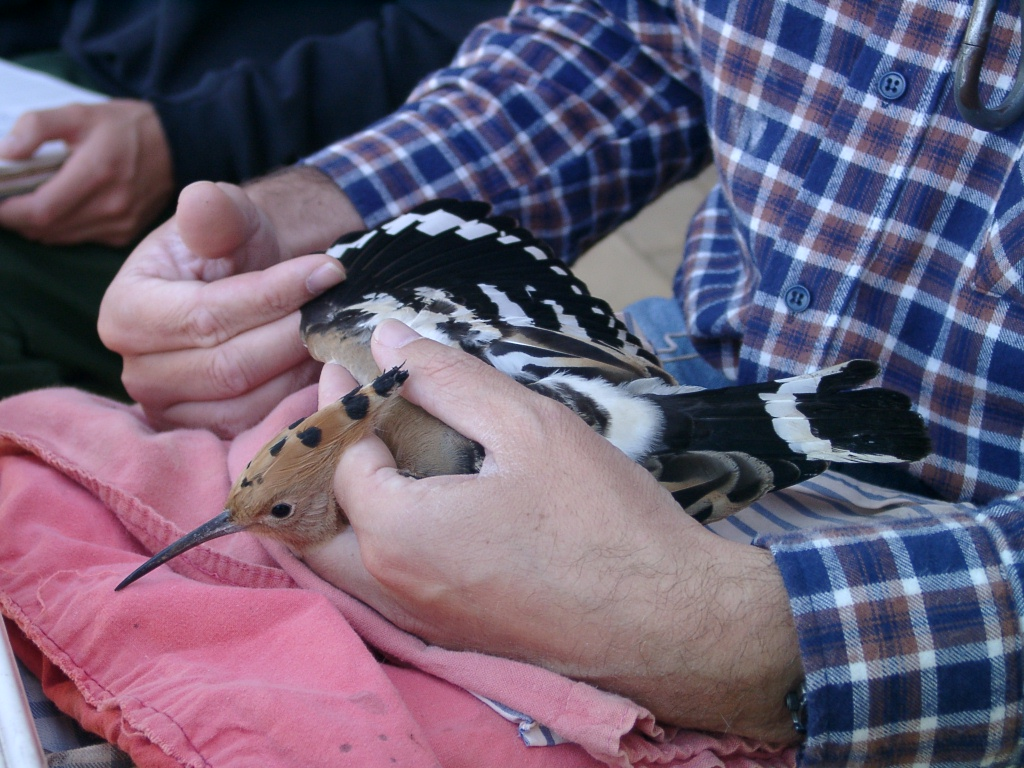
A bird ringer ageing a hoopoe at the Cruzinha field studies centre, Portugal

A Rocha operates field study centres in Canada (two centres), France (two centres), India, Kenya, Portugal and in the Czech Republic. These serve primarily as a base for A Rocha's and other organisations’ field studies and for environmental education, and most also offer accommodation for visitors.

Areas of A Rocha's work include:

- Species and landscape surveying and monitoring, such as raptor counts in Pembina Valley, Canada, camera trapping of mammals in India, the Kenya Bird Map, dry grassland biodiversity surveys in Switzerland and mapping tropical forests using unmanned aerial vehicles
- Habitat and species restoration projects, such as mangrove restoration projects in Ghana, and improving breeding chances for Grey-faced petrels by eradicating invasive mammals, restoring habitats and deploying artificial nests in Raglan, New Zealand, control of invasive Indian House crow in Kenya
- Reducing human–wildlife conflict in India, notably with elephants and leopards
- Setting up private or public parks and reserves such as the Kirosa Scott Reserve in Kenya, and Foxearth Reserve and Minet Country Park in the UK
- Enlarging and campaigning for the safeguarding of existing natural and protected areas, such as the Atewa Forest in Ghana, and the Alvor Estuary in Portugal
- Bridging biodiversity conservation and sustainable livelihoods, such as via sustainable agriculture and community garden projects across Canada; the Arabuko-Sokoke Schools and Eco-tourism Scheme in Kenya; the establishment of CREMAs (community resource management areas) around Mole National Park and Lake Bosumtwi, Ghana; and training community members in Uganda to construct bio-sand water filters
- Environmental education activities and resources, such as the Wild Lebanon website in Lebanon and "creation care camps" in the USA
- Carbon footprint reduction and mitigation projects, such as producing charcoal briquettes from waste in Uganda, the "Eco Church" church greening programme in the UK, and running "Climate Stewards", a global programme which encourages people to reduce their carbon footprint, and accepts donations to offset emissions via community forestry and cookstove projects in Ghana, Kenya and Mexico
- Cooperating worldwide for nature conservation, such as being a member of IUCN and IUCN's European Habitats Forum
- Engaging Christian communities with the relevance of nature conservation to the Christian faith, through conferences, speaking engagements, books and papers, and partnerships such as the Lausanne/WEA Creation Care Network

A Rocha also serves as an Erasmus+ / European Voluntary Service agency in France, the Netherlands and Portugal.

== See also ==
- Christian views on environmentalism
