= Andy Atkins =

Andy Atkins is a British environmentalist and social justice campaigner. Chief Executive Office for A Rocha UK since 2016, he was previously executive director of Friends of the Earth (England, Wales and Northern Ireland), and Advocacy Director at Tearfund. He is best known for helping to establish climate change as a mainstream issue for poverty and international development agencies, and as a founder of the Make Poverty History campaign.

== Early life and education ==
Atkins' early childhood was spent in Queensland, Australia as the child of missionary parents. A teenager in London, he has a degree in Geography from University College London and an MA in Development Studies from the Institute of Latin American Studies at the University of London.

== Career ==
Atkins' early career involved roles at the Chile Committee on Human Rights and CAFOD (the Catholic Agency for Overseas Development), before moves to the Progressio (then the Catholic Institute of International Relations) and Tearfund. As Policy and Campaigns Director at Tearfund he was instrumental in initiating the organization's work on climate change, framing it as a poverty issue, a move widely credited as the first major International Development organisation's involvement in the issue. He also played a key role in founding the Make Poverty History campaign in 2005.

Moving full-time to environmental campaigning, Atkins become CEO of Friends of the Earth (England, Wales and Northern Ireland) in 2008. During his tenue he introduced a wider remit into the strategy, including more campaigns around biodiversity with the introduction of the National Pollinator Strategy a key campaigning success. As CEO of A Rocha UK since 2016 he has overseen rapid growth of the Eco Church programme and coordinated environmental campaigns across faith groups, including leading the Climate Sunday Coalition, the UK Churches engagement at the 2021 Conference on Climate change, COP26 in Glasgow.

== Personal life ==
Atkins lives in London, is married to Sarah, and they have three adult children. He is a committed Christian.
