= Feast of Creation =

Celebration commemorating the creation of the universe

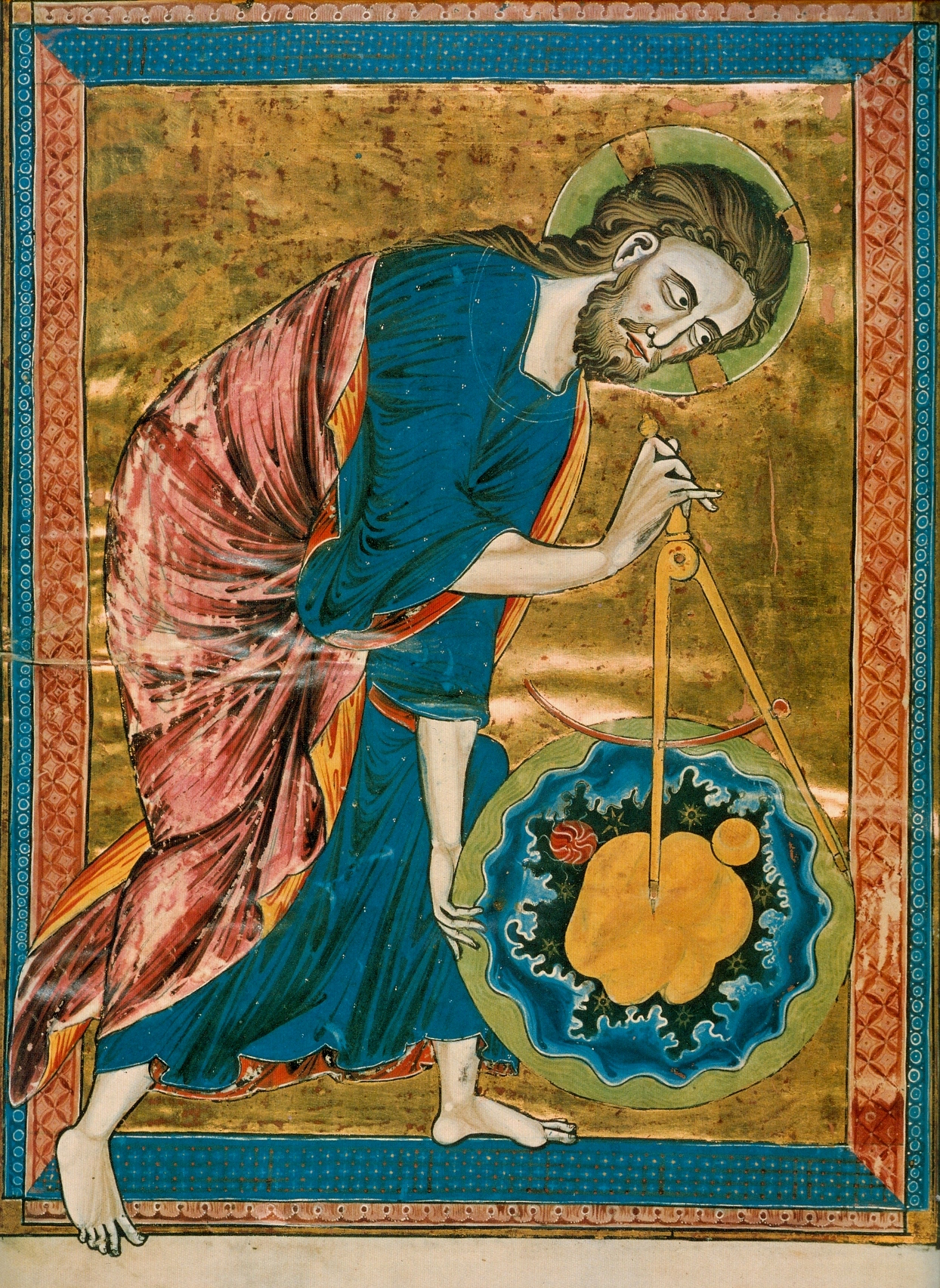
- God the Geometer — Gothic frontispiece of the Bible moralisée, representing God's act of Creation. France, mid-13th century
- Observed by: Christianity
- Type: Christian
- Observances: Church services, Via Creationis processions, planting trees, picking up litter
- Date: 1 September
- Frequency: annual
- Related to: Feast of Saint Francis of Assisi, Creationtide

The Feast of Creation, also known as the Feast of Creation in Christ, Creation Sunday, Creation Day or the World Day of Prayer for Creation, is celebrated in Christianity on September 1 or the subsequent Sunday to honour the creation of the universe by God and commemorate the "mystery of creation in Christ".

The Feast of Creation heralds God as Creator. On the Feast of Creation, the faithful offer "prayers and supplications to the Maker of all, both as thanksgiving for the great gift of Creation and as petitions for its protection and salvation," as proposed by the Ecumenical Patriarchate of the Orthodox Church in 1989. The Feast of Creation in Christ was officially adopted by the Revised Common Lectionary used by many Protestant churches, with readings for this day including the Genesis creation narrative in the Bible. In addition to partaking in liturgies of the Feast of Creation, Christians exercise environmental stewardship on the feast day through the caring for the world with activities such as planting trees or picking up litter. In addition to formal liturgies, ecumenical (interdenominational) prayer services are common on the Feast of Creation as well.

The Feast of Creation has long been observed by Christian denominations such as the Eastern Orthodox Churches and since the 1990s, the Catholic Church, Evangelical Lutheran Churches, Anglican Communion, Baptist Churches, and many others have celebrated the holy day. The feast is recognized and promoted by ecumenical bodies as the World Council of Churches. Flowing from this feast, the larger month of September is regarded by many Christian Churches as Creationtide or Season of Creation, which concludes on the Feast of Saint Francis of Assisi (October 4) as he is the patron saint of ecology.

== Date ==
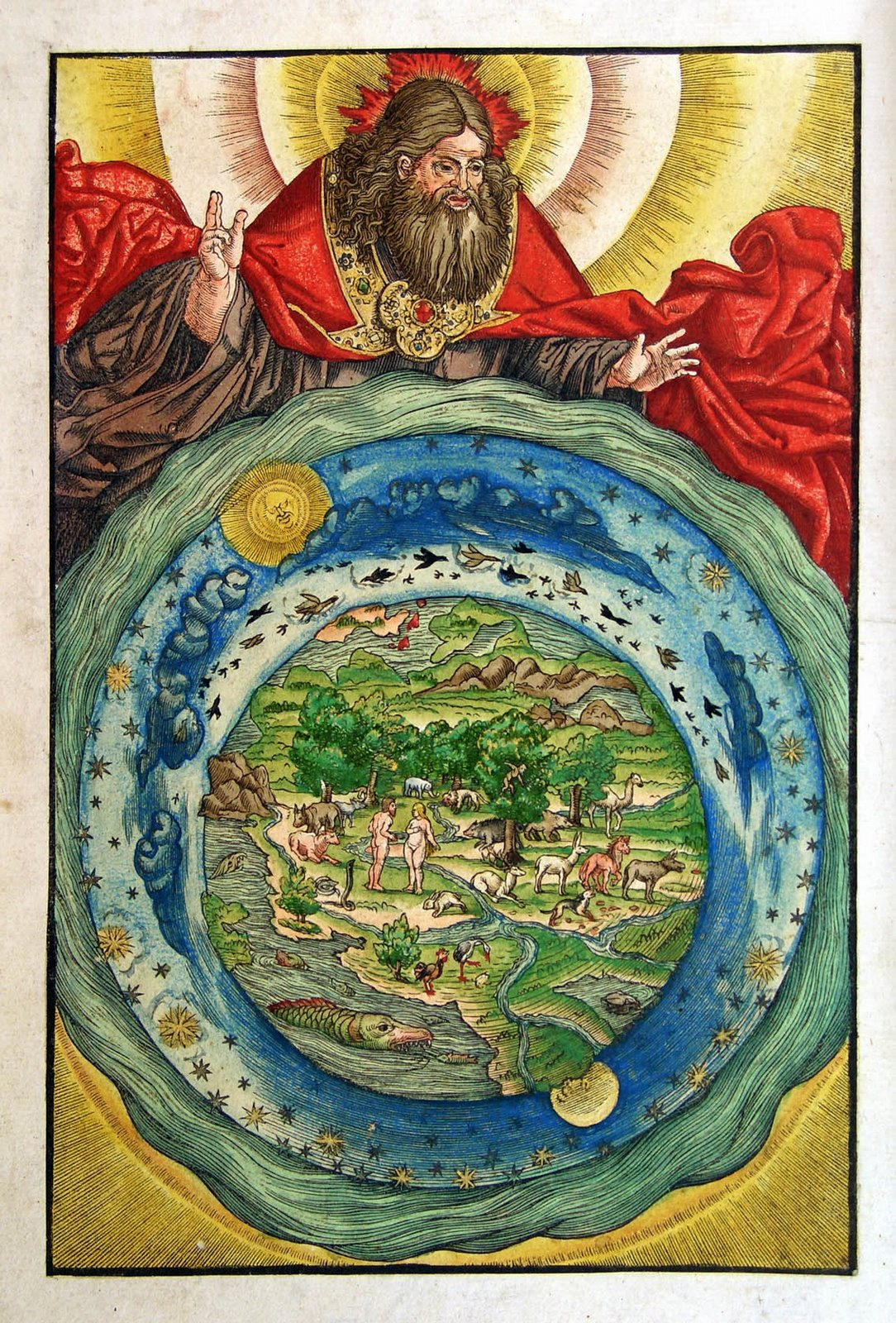
The Creation by Lucas Cranach the Elder, 1534

The calendar used by the Ecumenical Patriarchate of Constantinople from the 7th to the 18th century stipulated that God initiated the creation of the world on September 1, with that symbolism retained nowadays by being the feast marking the beginning of the Byzantine liturgical year. This day has thus been observed, since ancient Christian times, as a day symbolizing the beginning of Creation. It is formally known as the Feast of the Indiction in Orthodox liturgical books.

The oldest preserved Byzantine liturgical calendar, the Menologion of Basil II (10th century), explains: “Indikton [September 1] is celebrated by the Church of God, from the ancients, because it is thought to be the beginning of time... Therefore, the first day of September is also a defining month and the beginning of the whole year.”

As liturgist Gregory DiPippo explains, "the Creation of the world is considered to have taken place on the Indiction, a fact to which the liturgical texts of the day refer repeatedly."

Following the 1989 invitation from the Orthodox Church to the other Christian churches to pray together on this day, the feast has gained a lot of popularity across Christian denominations. The feast was officially adopted as the 'Feast of Creation in Christ' in the Revised Common Lectionary used by many Protestant churches, including Evangelical-Lutherans, Reformed, Anglicans, Methodists, and others. The announcement was made by the Consultation on Common Texts in April 2026, constituting the first new feast adopted by the common lectionary since its 1983 release, when Baptism of the Lord and Christ the King were adopted.

The Feast of Creation (September 1) inaugurates the Season of Creation that concludes on the Feast of Saint Francis of Assisi (October 4), which is sometimes marked by the blessing of animals.

== Theological significance ==
Following a series of theological conferences in Assisi, Italy, an ecumenical committee comprising the World Council of Churches, Middle East Council of Churches, various Christian world communions prepared a report synthesizing the main theological themes of the Feast of Creation. Namely, the feast contains four interrelated themes:

1. Creation as God’s creative act (the feast’s core)
2. Creation as a Christological mystery (the entry point and feast title given the liturgical year’s theology)
3. Creation as a Trinitarian mystery, and
4. Creation as a sacramental and covenantal gift.

Many churches have adopted a Christological title, 'Feast of Creation in Christ', as the entry point into the theological themes of the festival. This is in line with the Christological nature of the liturgical year, with the various feasts focusing on different aspects of the mystery of Christ.

== Observance by Christian denomination ==
=== Eastern Orthodoxy ===
The Eastern Orthodox Churches have observed the Feast of the Indiction, as it is otherwise known, since the 5th century. Grounding the ancient Byzantine Anno Mundi calendar, September 1 symbolizes the day of God's creation of the world.

For that reason, the creation theme is expressed in the liturgical prayers of this feast since ancient times. For example, the liturgical texts that define the theology of an Orthodox feast, called troparion and kontakion, lay out this theme: "The troparion and kontakion devote special attention to some immutable truths of creation: The Lord is the Creator of all creation."

In 1989, the Ecumenical Patriarch Demetrios I of Constantinople invited "the whole Christian world" to pray together on September 1 and "offer prayers and supplications to the Maker of all, both as thanksgiving for the great gift of Creation and as petitions for its protection and salvation.” Along with the Eastern Orthodox Churches, the Eastern Lutheran Churches and Eastern Catholic Churches observe the Feast of Creation.

=== Roman Catholicism ===
The Feast of Creation has been observed by various episcopal conferences of the Catholic Church since the 1990s. In 2015, Pope Francis "instituted it as the World Day of Prayer for the universal Catholic Church." In his message for Creation Day in 2025, Pope Leo XIV noted that “for believers, environmental justice is also a duty born of faith, since the universe reflects the face of Jesus Christ, in whom all things were created and redeemed.” In the same year, Pope Leo XIV promulgated the "Creation Mass", added to the Roman Missal, to be used on the Feast of Creation. Many episcopal conferences, religious congregations, and Catholic associations are actively engaged in promoting the liturgical celebrations of Creation Day with the new Mass.

=== Evangelical Lutheranism ===
The General Secretary of the Lutheran World Federation noted the importance of the Feast of Creation to the Evangelical Lutheran tradition:

Creation and redemption through incarnation and cross, Lange noted, “are most evident in the sacraments” and also “shaped Luther’s call for the renewal of sacramental life.” By focusing on the material or ‘created’ elements of water, bread and wine used in the Eucharistic liturgy to symbolize the life and death of Jesus, he said, Lutherans are called “to care for the for the waters, the land, the fruits, the air.”

=== Anglicanism ===
The Feast Day of Creation, along with the season of Creationtide, is observed by the Church of England, mother church of the Anglican Communion, and many other Anglican churches.

=== Free church traditions ===
The so-called "Free church traditions" who do not follow a liturgical calendar, such as certain Baptists, Methodists, Pentecostals, and others, also celebrate the observance, frequently with the title "Creation Sunday". The celebration is endorsed and encouraged by various global bodies of those traditions, such as World Evangelical Alliance, World Methodist Council, Baptist World Alliance, Pentecostal World Fellowship, Mennonite World Conference, Lausanne Movement, and The Salvation Army.

== See also ==
- Christian views on environmentalism
- Ecotheology
