= Lorsch Bee Blessing =

Prayer

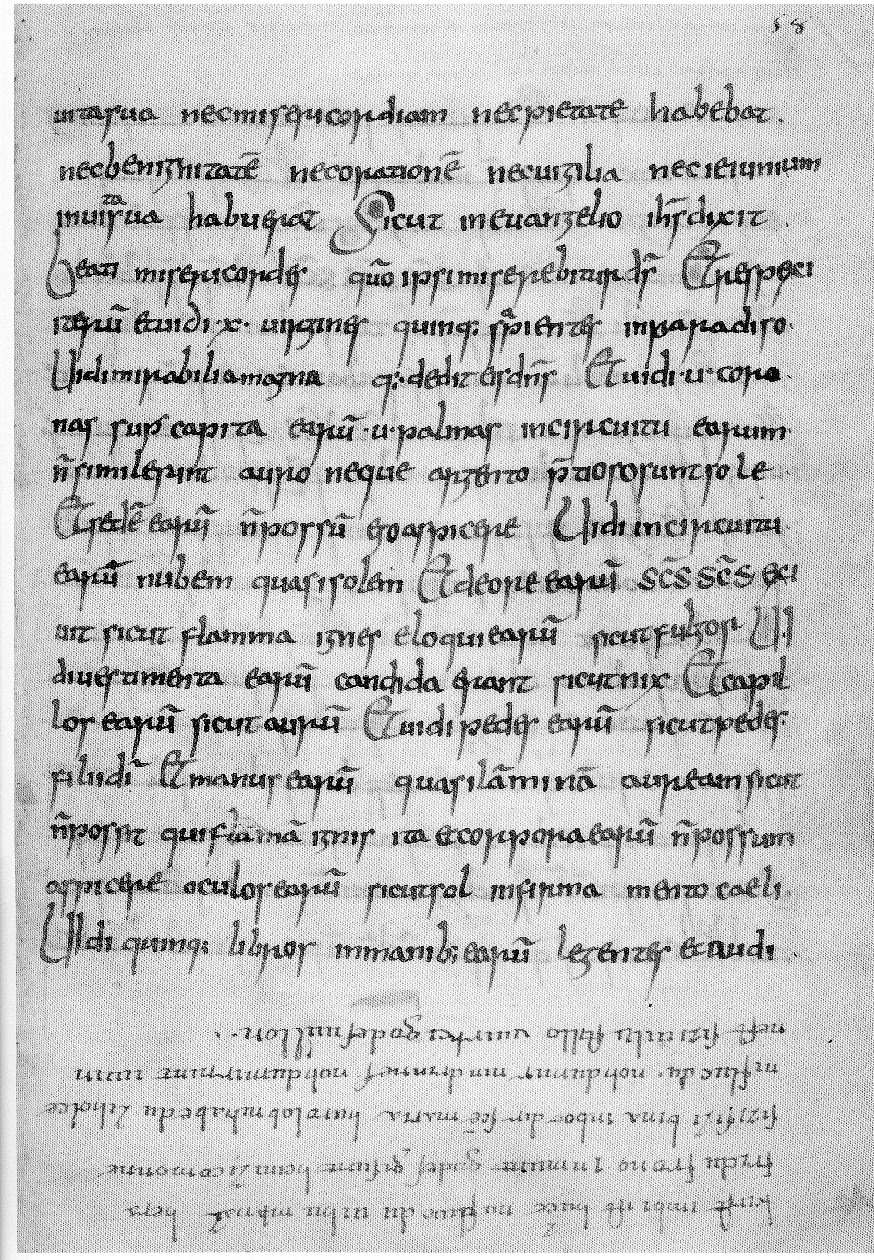
Lorsch Bee Blessing (Lorscher Bienensegen) manuscript (Pal. lat. 220, fol. 58r)

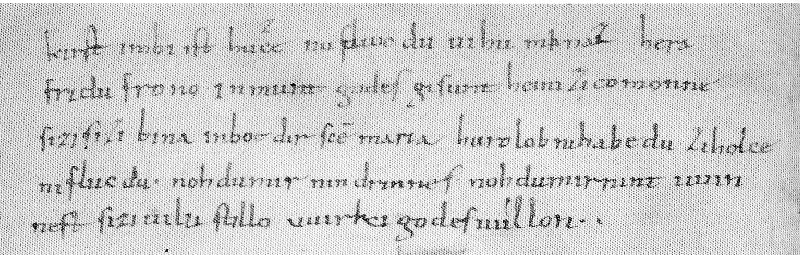
Detail (rotated)

The Lorsch Bee Blessing (German: Lorscher Bienensegen) is a bee-keeping prayer intended to bring home honey bees in good health to their hives. It is believed to have been written in the 10th century, and was discovered in a manuscript (on fol. 58r of the Pal. lat. 220 in the Vatican Library, a copy of the Apocalypse of Paul) from the monastery in Lorsch, Germany, famous for the Lorsch Codex. Despite being a Christian prayer written in Old High German, it has remarkable similarities to the Anglo-Saxon and apparently pagan "For a Swarm of Bees" (Old English "wiþ ymbe") magic charm. It may reflect a common pre-Christian Germanic cultural heritage. It is likely that the text was added to the lower margin of its manuscript to be removed and used as an amulet in an apiary.

== Text ==
=== Old High German ===
Kirst, imbi ist hûcze
Nû fliuc dû, vihu mînaz, hera
Fridu frôno in munt godes
gisunt heim zi comonne

Sizi, sizi bîna
Inbôt dir sancte Maria
Hurolob ni habe dû
Zi holce ni flûc dû

Noh dû mir nindrinnês
Noh dû mir nintuuinnêst
Sizi vilu stillo
Uuirki godes uuillon

=== Translation ===
Christ, the bee swarm is out here!
Now fly, you my animal, come.
In the Lord's peace, in God's protection,
come home in good health.

Sit, sit bee.
The command to you from the Holy Mary.
You have no vacation;
Don't fly into the woods;

Neither should you slip away from me.
Nor escape from me.
Sit completely still.
Do God's will.
