= Stewardship (theology) =

Divine belief in one's responsibility for the world

Stewardship is a theological belief in religion that humans are responsible for the world, humanity, and the gifts and resources that they claim they have been entrusted by a deity or higher power.

In Abrahamic religions, stewardship is commonly used in reference to maintaining and growing the resources of a religious institution. This could include the practices of financial management of religious institutions, such as fundraising and management of financial assets. In Christianity, institutions may use stewardship theology to justify congregants providing financial contributions to a church.

The idea of stewardship in theology has grown in response to climate change. Many religions have incorporated environmental stewardship as a part of their theology. It can have political implications, such as in Christian democracy. Many moderate and progressive Roman Catholics, Orthodox Christians, and Evangelical Protestants see some form of environmentalism as a consequence of stewardship. In Jewish, Christian and Muslim traditions, stewardship refers to the way time, talents, material possessions, or wealth are used or given for the service of God. Some nontheistic religions or secular views include a Gaia philosophy which accepts the Earth as a holy being or goddess.

== Christian stewardship ==
Stewardship in Christianity is a theological concept that concerns the management of resources and gifts that God has entrusted them. Rooted in earlier concepts of Jewish stewardship in the Hebrew Bible, stewardship theology affirms human stewardship over the earth which is laid out strongly in the book of Genesis and the Psalms.

The Bible provides guidance for Christian adherents on how to raise funds for Christian institutions and how to allocate resources. Stewardship is an all encompassing concept that is derived from the notion that the Earth was to humans by a higher power such as God. In many denominations of Western Christianity, stewardship is heavily rooted in the concept of anthropocentrism and the notion that humans are specially chosen by God to have dominion over the Earth. Views on stewardship are variable based on tradition and the faith background of the Christian group.

Frequent references to the "tithe", or giving of a portion are found throughout the Bible as part of the Jewish law. The tithe represents the returning to God a significant, specific, and intentional portion of material gain; under the Jewish law, the first ten percent of one's food product (produce or animal livestock) was to be sacrificed at the temple for the sustenance of the Levites. Giving is not limited to the tithe or any specific amount, illustrated by Jesus' comment that a woman who gave a very small amount had given more than those had given large amounts because "while they gave out of their abundance, she gave all she had to live on" (the lesson of the widow's mite).

=== Environmental stewardship (theology) ===
Many Liberal Mainline denominations have revised the theology of Christian stewardship to include environmental protectionism and sustainable management of natural resources. A biblical world view of stewardship can be consciously defined as: "Utilising and managing all resources God provides for the glory of God and the betterment of His creation." The central essence of biblical world view stewardship is managing everything God brings into the believer's life in a manner that honors God and impacts eternity.

Stewardship is further supported and sustained theologically on the understanding of God's holiness as found in such verse as: Genesis 1:2, Psalm 104, Psalm 113, 1 Chronicles 29:10-20, Colossians 1:16, and Revelation 1:8. There is a strong link between stewardship and environmentalism. Environmental stewardship is typically thought of as entailing reducing human impacts into the natural world. Philosopher Neil Paul Cummins wrote that humans have a special stewardship role on the planet as those who, through their technology, can save life from otherwise certain elimination. This is a modern-day interpretation of Noah's Ark, the cornerstone of human stewardship being technological protection and regulation.

== Judaism ==
There are many passages in the Hebrew Bible stewardship. Stewardship in Judaism is founded on the story of the Noahic Covenant and the Abrahamic Covenant which established the Hebrew people as the chosen people.

For instance, Malachi 3:6–12 outlines the importance of tithing and states that not giving tithes to the temple is equivalent to "robbing" God. The passage emphasizes that stewardship of God's resources and giving to religious institutions must be maintained even during economic turbulence.

The Jewish holiday of Tu Bishvat, or "the New Year of the Trees" (Rosh Hashanah La-Ilanot"), is also known as Jewish Arbor Day. Some want to expand it to a more global environmental focus.

== Indigenous religion ==
Stewardship is a recurrent theme among many indigenous religions across the globe. Views on human responsibility for the earth is varied and diverse. In North America, some indigenous groups such as the Anishinaabe have a less anthropocentric view of human existence, viewing humans as an integrated facet of ecology and base their ethical obligations to the earth through that lens.

== See also ==
- Christianity and environmentalism
- Ecotheology
- Evangelical environmentalism
- Parable of the talents or minas
- Hima (environmental protection)
- Kaitiaki
- Judaism and environmentalism
- Religion and environmentalism
- Islamic environmentalism
- Resacralization of nature
- Spiritual ecology
- Laudato si'
