= Catholic Earthcare Australia =

Environmental arm of the Catholic Church in Australia

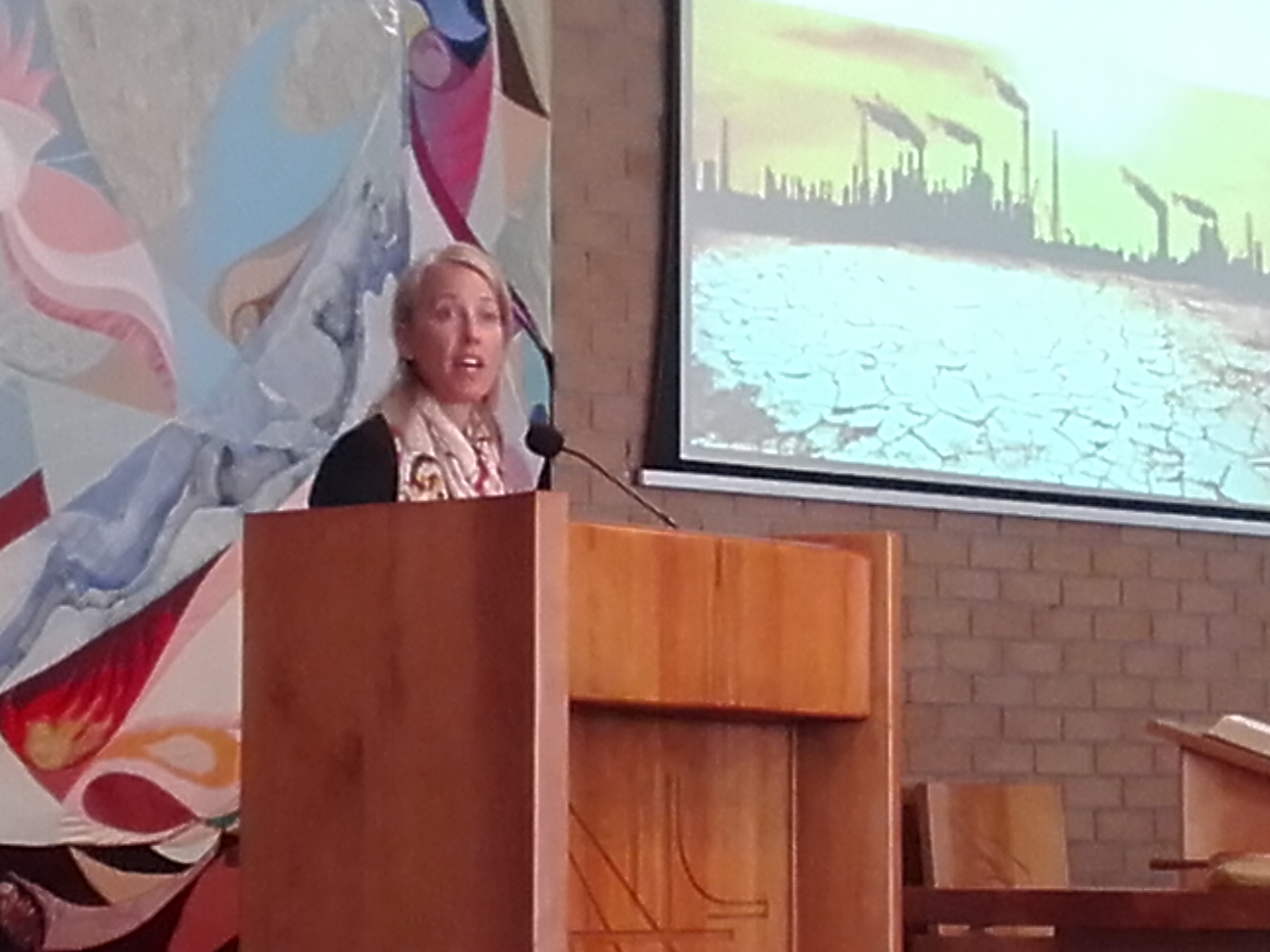
Jacqui Remond, Director, Catholic Earthcare Australia

Catholic Earthcare Australia is an agency of the Australian Catholic Bishops Conference and is the environmental arm of the Catholic Church in Australia. This executive agency of the Bishops' Commission for Justice and Development (BCJD) is mandated with the mission of advising, supporting and assisting the BCJD in responding to Pope John Paul II's call to "stimulate and sustain the ecological conversion" throughout the Catholic church in Australia and beyond.

In May 2017, the Australian Catholic Bishops Conference decided to incorporate Catholic Earthcare Australia into its sister agency, Caritas Australia. This change was made to strengthen the capacity of Catholic Earthcare Australia, particularly in advocating and educating about the principles of Holy Father's 2015 encyclical, Laudato Si', and to achieve synergies with Caritas Australia's extensive education and advocacy work around Australia, including parishes, schools and the wider Catholic community on environmental issues such as climate change.

After the Laudato Si' Action Platform was created and the Plenary Council decreed that all schools, parishes, eparchy's, organisations and diocese were to have a Laudato Si' action plan by 2030, Catholic Earthcare Australia was tasked by the Australian Catholic Bishops to support in the rolling out of this initiative. To support each sector in their endeavour to create a plan to respond to the 7 Laudato Si' goals, an Australian Guide to Laudato Si' action planning was created. As well as documents to support self-assessment, reflection and planning processes to align with the Laudato Si' action platform.

Catholic Earthcare also coordinates a number of state and community networks for the purpose of resource sharing, providing advice and strengthening the Australian Catholic Church's response to care for our common home.

== Mandate from the Australian Bishops ==
Tasks and Responsibilities

Catholic Earthcare Australia will act as an advisory agency to the BCJD on ecological matters, including the safeguarding of the integrity of creation, environmental justice and ecological sustainability.

Its tasks will include:

- carrying out research, from the perspective of scripture and the Church's environmental and social justice teachings;
- developing national networks, with a view to initiating, linking, resourcing and supporting ecological endeavours within the Church, and extending the hand of friendship and cooperation to other like-minded groups working in the broader community;
- undertaking initiatives by encouraging a reverence for creation, a responsible stewardship of Earth's natural resources and ecosystems, and providing a voice for the victims of pollution, environmental degradation and injustice;
- providing educational materials and services to Catholic schools, organisations, congregations and parishes – particularly information to assist in the carrying out of environmental audits and the implementation of more ecologically and ethically sustainable practices.
