= Master of Saint Veronica =

German painter

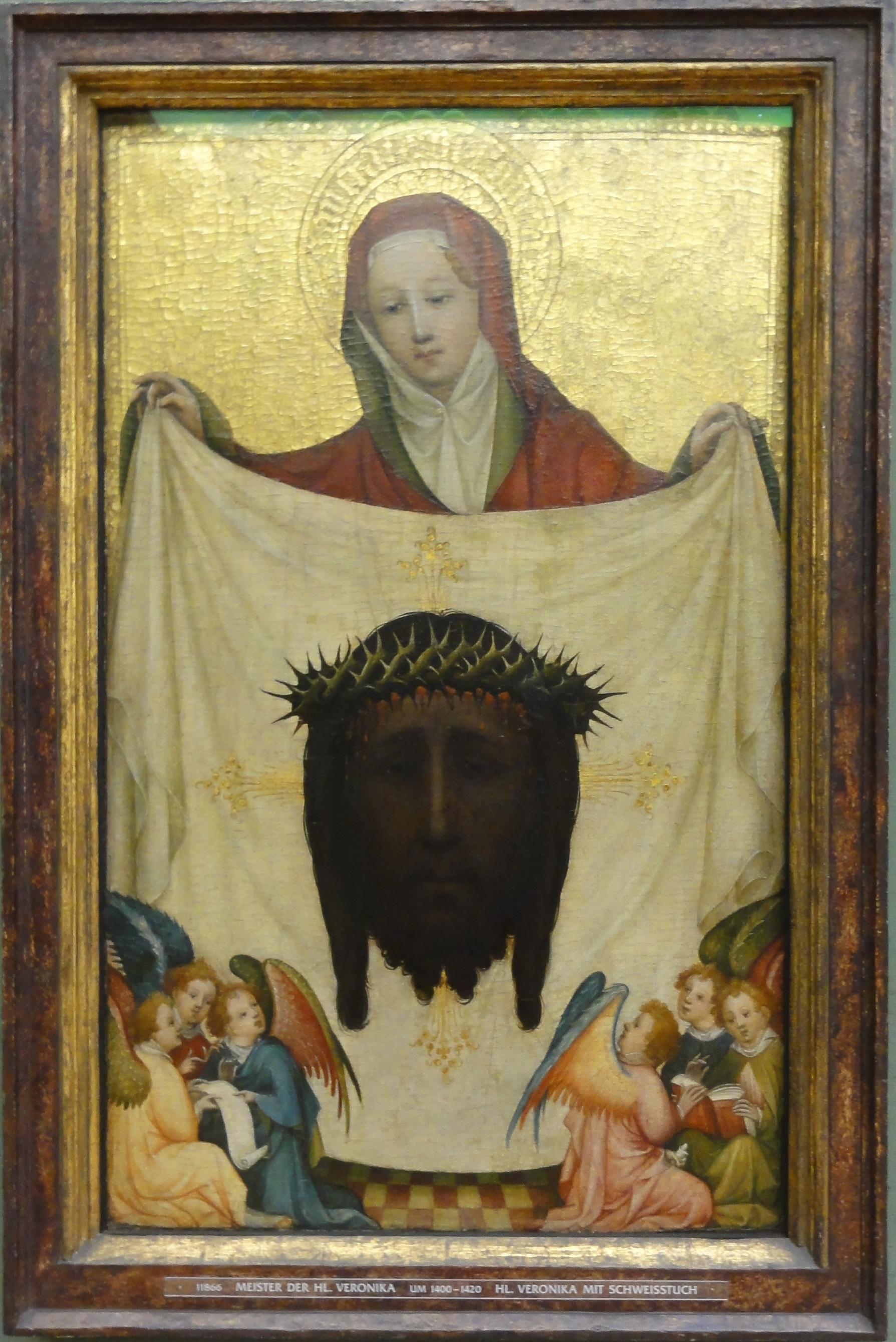
Saint Veronica with the Holy Kerchief, c 1420. Alte Pinakothek, Munich

The Master of Saint Veronica (active c. 1400 – 1420), was a German painter working in the International Gothic style.

He was active in Cologne and is known for his religious works. Nothing is known of his life, his notname is based on a painting of Saint Veronica with the Sudarium commissioned for the church of St Severin, Cologne, but now in the Alte Pinakothek, Munich. As well as panel paintings, detached miniatures probably from an illuminated manuscript, now in the Getty Museum, have been attributed to him.
