= Dog bakery =

Retail establishment selling pet treats

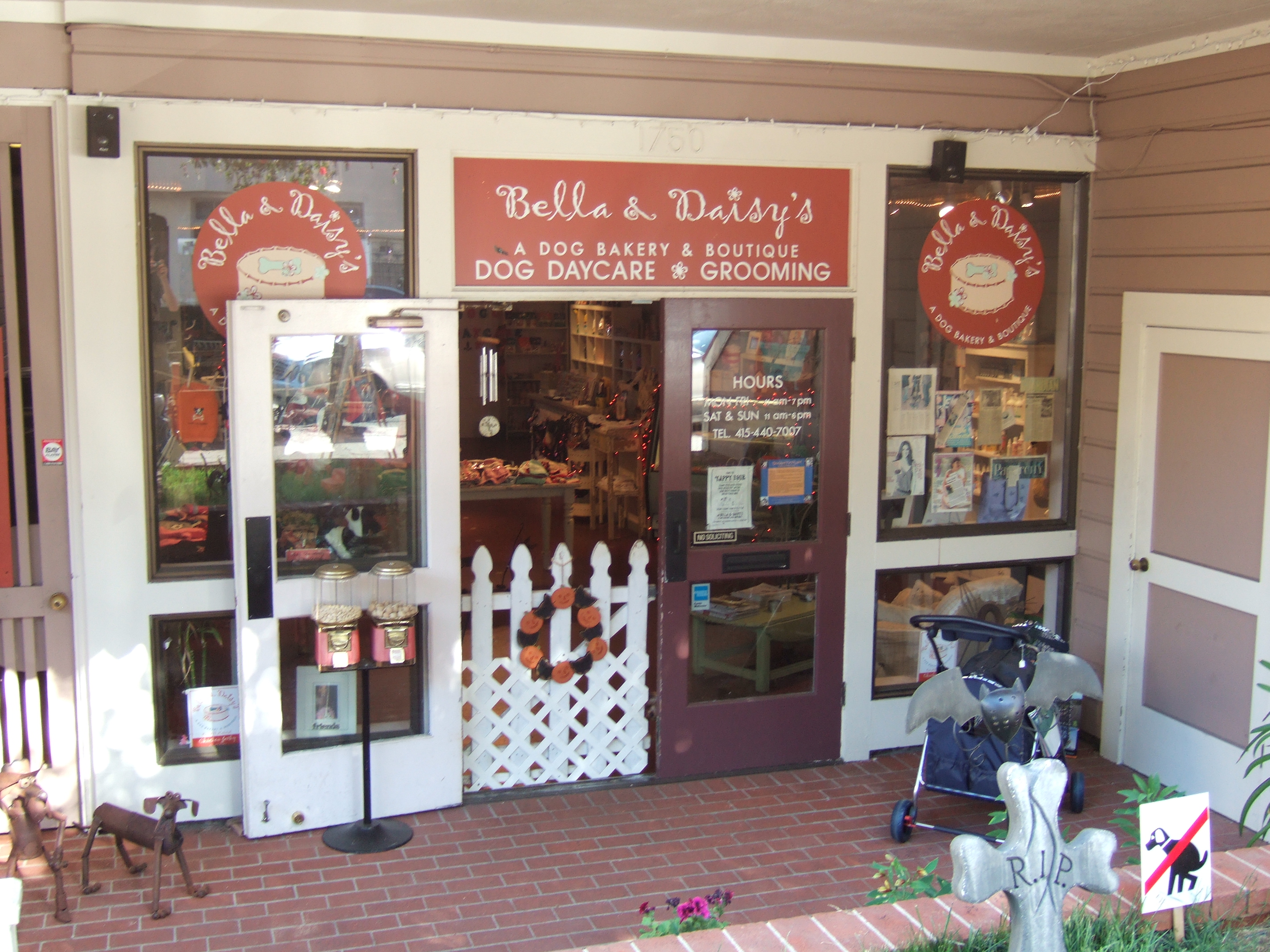
Dog bakery in San Francisco.

A dog bakery is a bakery of dog food. Sometimes referred to as a "barkery".

== History ==
Dog bakeries are an outgrowth of the dog biscuit industry.

The first dog bakery was created in 1989 by a Kansas City couple who had been baking for their sick dog in an attempt to get her to eat. They eventually opened multiple dog bakeries under the name Three Dog Bakery and now have shops in Japan and Korea as well as the US. As of 2008 there were an estimated 800 dog bakeries in the United States. As of 2017 there were online dog bakeries.

Some dog bakeries carry specialty pastries and treats especially for dogs with allergies, dietary needs, or bad breath.

Some human bakeries also carry baked good for pets, and some pet supplies stores have bakery sections with trained chefs baking onsite.

== Products ==
Typically dog bakeries produce cookie-like items decorated to appeal to humans but made with ingredients that are formulated to be safe for dogs, such as using carob instead of chocolate, little or no sugar or salt, and flavors that appeal to dogs such as peanut butter and yogurt. Some bakeries also produce cupcakes and tarts. The ingredients used are human food grade quality and can safely be consumed by humans as well as pets.

== Reasons for popularity ==
As of the 2010s there has been a trend among United States consumers to humanize and indulge their pets. As a general trend consumers in the US have become more concerned about the ingredients in their own food, and this has made some more concerned about their pets' food too, including concerns over the ingredients and additives in commercially produced pet treats.
