= Cushman Amberg Communications =

Cushman/Amberg Communications is an independent communications agency headquartered in Chicago with an additional office in St. Louis.

== History ==
The agency was founded in Chicago in 1952 by Aaron Cushman as Aaron D. Cushman and Associates, signing the Illinois Eisenhower for President Campaign as one of its first clients. After an early focus in the entertainment industry, the agency expanded to serve a range of companies, from start-ups to Fortune 100s.

Over the years, the agency has maintained several satellite offices to serve different niche markets. Past offices include New York City; Los Angeles; Washington, D.C; and Omaha.

Following a 12-year career in the newspaper business, Thomas Amberg joined Aaron D. Cushman and Associates in 1983 and purchased the agency in early 1997, changing the name to reflect new ownership. The agency acquired boutique public relations firm Chuck Werle and Associates in 2000 and the healthcare marketing/public relations shop HealthInfo Direct in late 2006.

The agency’s capabilities include strategic counsel, media and analyst relations, crisis communications, social/online, message mapping, media training, media measurement, internal communications, editorial services, graphic design, event planning and executive positioning.

== Sources ==
- St. Louis Business Journal - Largest Public Relations Firms
- Hoover's Company Database
- St. Louis Business Journal - Cushman/Amberg acquires HealthInfo Direct
- Answers.com
- O'Dwyer's PR Firm Database
- Council of PR Firms: The Firm Voice
- Inside the Minds: The Art of Public Relations

Thomas L. Amberg, Christopher P.A. Komisarjevsky, Rich Jernstedt, Ron Watt, Sr., Richard Edelman, Lou Rena Hammond, Anthony J. Russo, PhD., Robyn M. Sachs, Patrice A. Tanaka, and David Finn. Inside the Minds: The Art of Public Relations. 2002-->
