= For a Swarm of Bees =

Anglo-Saxon metrical charm

"For a Swarm of Bees" is an Anglo-Saxon metrical charm that was intended for use in keeping honey bees from swarming. The text was discovered by John Mitchell Kemble in the 19th century. The charm is named for its opening words, "wiþ ymbe", meaning "against (or towards) a swarm of bees".

In the most often studied portion, towards the end of the text where the charm itself is located, the bees are referred to as sigewif, "victory-women". The word has been associated by Kemble, Jacob Grimm, and other scholars with the notion of valkyries (Old English wælcyrian), and "shield maidens", hosts of female beings attested in Old Norse and, to a lesser extent, Old English sources, similar to or identical with the Idise of the Merseburg Incantations. Some scholars have theorized the compound to be a simple metaphor for the "victorious sword" (the stinging) of the bees.

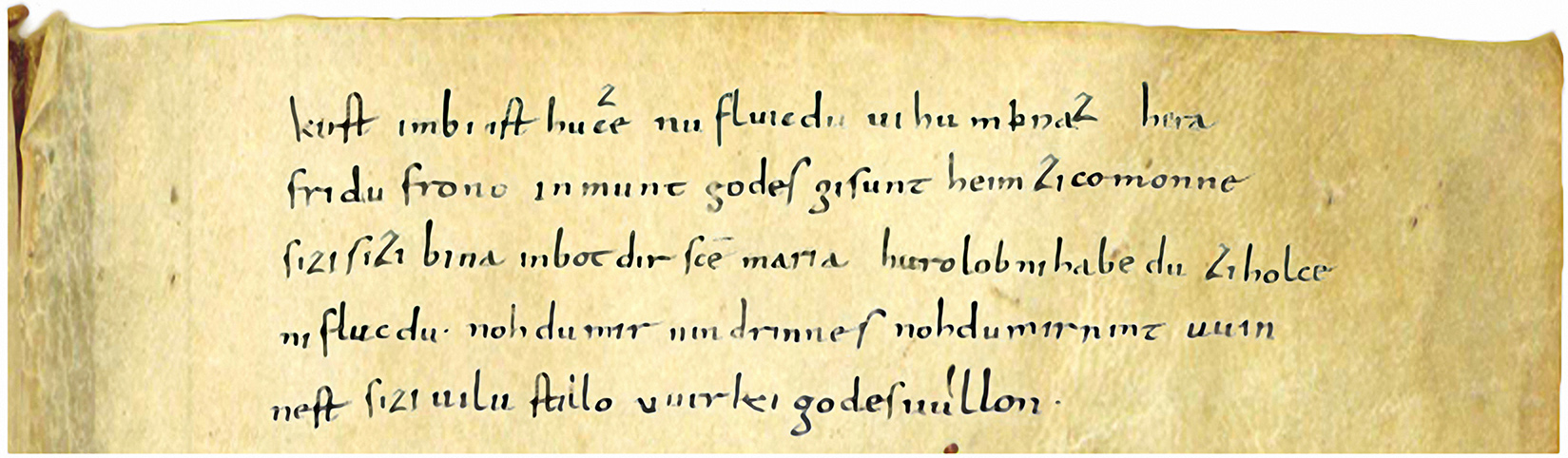
Lorscher Bienensegen manuscript

In 1909, the scholar Felix Grendon recorded what he saw as similarities between the charm and the Lorsch Bee Blessing, a manuscript portion of the Lorsch Codex, from the monastery in Lorsch, Germany. Grendon suggested that the two could possibly have a common origin in pre-Christian Germanic culture.

== Charm text ==
Sitte ge, sīgewīf, sīgað tō eorðan, (Note: Sige is a homonym for both victory in war and sunset and it is related to the Sigel (Sowilo) rune.)
næfre ge wilde tō wuda fleogan, (Note: Jacob Grimm proposed wille instead of wilde for grammatical or poetic reasons but it does not fundamentally alter his translation. Wilde means wildly, whereas wille means willfully, as well as a literal or figurative stream.)
beō ge swā gemindige, mīnes gōdes, (Note: Beo may mean both "bee" and "be thou".)
swā bið manna gehwilc, metes and ēðeles. (Note: Eðel may be both the name of the Odal rune as well as having all of its variant implications ranging from home, property, inheritance, country, fatherland, to nobility.)

Settle down, victory-women, sink to earth,
never be wild and fly to the woods.
Be as mindful of my welfare,
as is each man of border and of home.

== Editions ==
- Foys, Martin et al. Old English Poetry in Facsimile Project (Center for the History of Print and Digital Culture, University of Wisconsin–Madison, 2019-); digital facsimile edition and Modern English translation

== Sources ==
- Kemble, John Mitchell (1876). The Saxons in England, A History of The English Commonwealth, Till The Period of The Norman Conquest. Vol. 1. London: B. Quaritch.
- Grendon, Felix (1909). The Anglo-Saxon Charms. The Journal of American Folklore.
- Grimm, Jacob (1854). Deutsche Mythologie (German Mythology). Göttingen: Dieterische Bechhandlung.
- Bosworth, Joseph; Toller, T. Northcote (1889–1921). An Anglo-Saxon Dictionary with Supplements and Corrections by T. Northcote Toller.
- Greenfield, Stanley B.; Calder, Daniel Gillmore (1996). A New Critical History of Old English Literature. New York: New York University Press. ISBN 0-8147-3088-4.
- Davidson, Hilda Ellis (1990). Gods and Myths of Northern Europe. Penguin. ISBN 0-14-013627-4.
