= Naturewatch Foundation =

British charitable organization

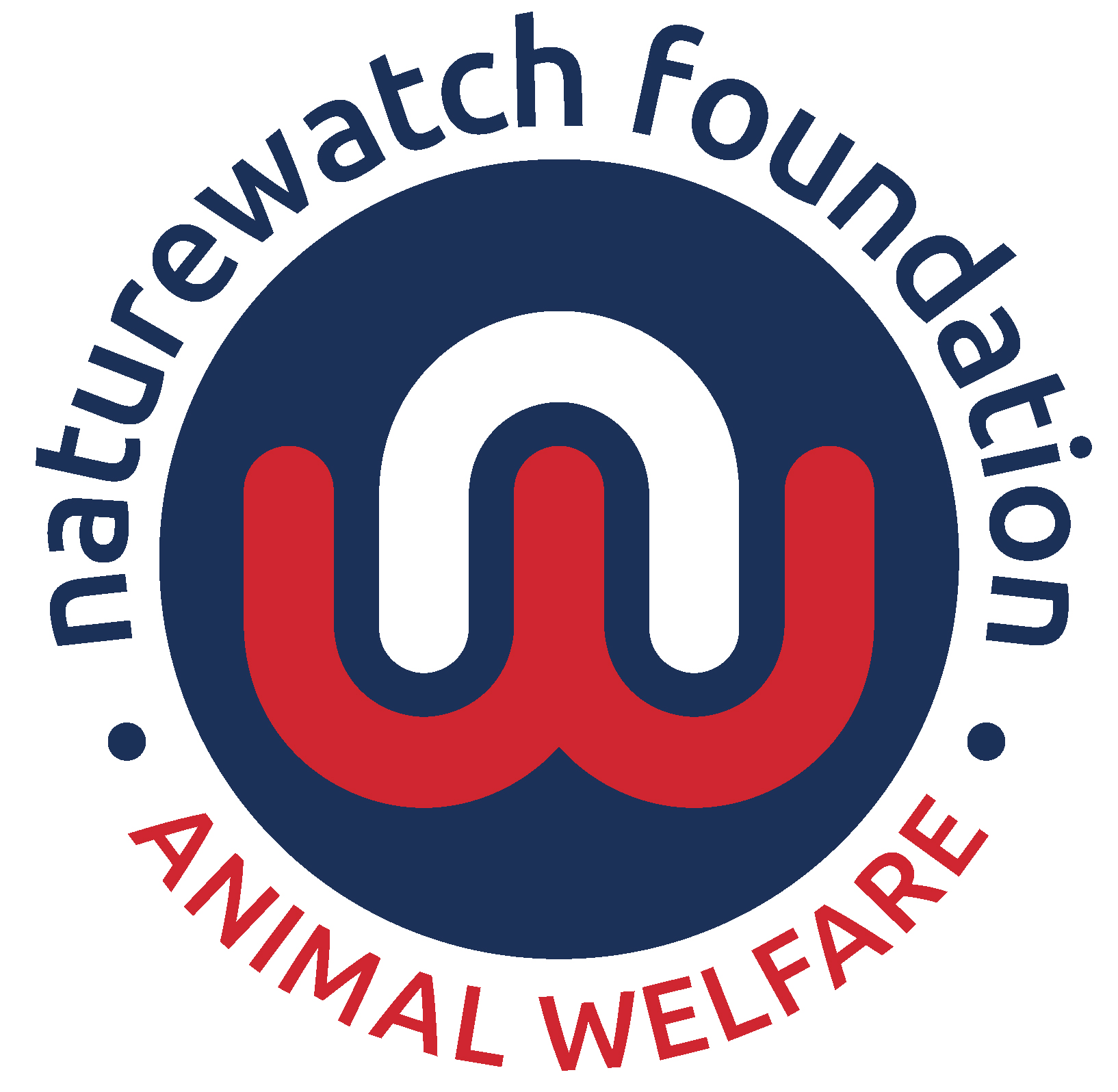
- Founded: 1991
- Founder: John Ruane
- Type: Animal welfare charity
- Registration no.: 1039679
- Purpose: animal welfare
- Location: Cheltenham, England
- Region served: United Kingdom
- Method: Campaigning, lobbying, humane education
- Website: www.naturewatch.org

Naturewatch Foundation, founded in 1991 by the late John Ruane, is a registered charity in the UK. Their mission is to "end animal cruelty and advance animal welfare standards around the world".

== Campaigns and activities ==
Naturewatch Foundation conducts animal welfare campaigns within the United Kingdom, most notably:

- Companion animal breeding
- Wildlife crime
- Animal experiments
- The link between animal abuse and human violence (‘Protect Animals. Protect People’).
- Animal welfare in Eastern Europe

They have published The Compassionate Shopping Guide regularly since 1993, endorsing cruelty-free cosmetic and household product brands under strict endorsement criteria.

They have also coordinated the World Animal Day movement since 2003. Naturewatch Foundation was awarded the Animal and the Environment Charity award in 2024.

== Patrons ==
- Rula Lenska
- Hayley Mills
- Chris Packham
- Paul Goodenough
- Dan Richardson
- Wendy Turner Webster
