= Conservatism =

Political philosophy based on tradition

Conservatism is a cultural, social, and political philosophy and ideology that seeks to promote and preserve traditional institutions, customs, and values. The central tenets of conservatism may vary in relation to the culture and civilization in which it appears. In Western culture, depending on the particular nation and the particular time period, conservatives seek to promote and preserve a range of institutions, such as the nuclear family, organized religion, the military, the nation-state, constitution, property rights, rule of law, aristocracy, and monarchy.

The 18th-century Anglo-Irish statesman Edmund Burke, who opposed the French Revolution, is credited as one of the forefathers of Western conservative thought in the 1790s along with Savoyard statesman Joseph de Maistre. The first established use of the term in a political context originated in 1818 with François-René de Chateaubriand during the period of Bourbon Restoration that sought to roll back the policies of the French Revolution and establish social order.

Conservatism has varied considerably as it has adapted itself to existing traditions and national cultures. Thus, conservatives from different parts of the world, each upholding their respective traditions, may disagree on a wide range of issues. One of the three major ideologies along with liberalism and socialism, conservatism is the dominant ideology in many countries across the world, including Hungary, India, Iran, Israel, Italy, Japan, Poland, and Russia. Historically associated with right-wing politics, the term has been used to describe a wide range of views. Conservatism may be either libertarian or authoritarian, populist or elitist, progressive or reactionary, moderate or extreme.

== Beliefs and principles ==
One of the first individual's to use the term 'conservatism' in an official political context, was Francois Rene de Chateaubriand. Chateaubriand named five themes (in the context of his time): Religion, King, Freedom, Charter, and Honest People. He also named three principles: Religion, Order, and Justice.

Scholars have tried to define conservatism as a set of beliefs or principles. Political scientist Andrew Heywood argues that the five central beliefs of conservatism are tradition, human imperfection, organic society, authority/hierarchy, and property. Meanwhile, historian Russell Kirk developed six canons and ten principles of conservative thought.

Some political scientists, such as Samuel P. Huntington, have added that while conservatism has core values, going back to the teachings of Edmund Burke, it is also a situational ideology, which aims to conserve diverse social traditions. Under this definition, conservatives are seen as defending the established institutions of their time. According to Quintin Hogg, the chairman of the British Conservative Party in 1959: "Conservatism is not so much a philosophy as an attitude, a constant force, performing a timeless function in the development of a free society, and corresponding to a deep and permanent requirement of human nature itself."

Conservatism has been called a "philosophy of human imperfection" by political scientist Noël O'Sullivan, reflecting among its adherents a negative view of human nature and pessimism of the potential to improve it through 'utopian' schemes. Political philosopher Thomas Hobbes, the "intellectual godfather of the realist right", argued that the state of nature for humans was "poor, nasty, brutish, and short", requiring centralized authority with royal sovereignty to guarantee law and order. Political philosopher Edmund Burke, often called the father of modern conservatism, believed that human beings are steeped in original sin and that society therefore needs traditional institutions, such as an established church and a landed aristocracy, in order to function.

=== Tradition ===
Despite the lack of a universal definition, certain themes can be recognized as common across conservative thought. According to philosopher Michael Oakeshott:

To be conservative […] is to prefer the familiar to the unknown, to prefer the tried to the untried, fact to mystery, the actual to the possible, the limited to the unbounded, the near to the distant, the sufficient to the superabundant, the convenient to the perfect, present laughter to utopian bliss.

Such traditionalism may be a reflection of trust in time-tested methods of social organization, giving 'votes to the dead'. Traditions may also be steeped in a sense of identity.

=== Hierarchy ===
In contrast to the tradition-based definition of conservatism, some left-wing political theorists like Corey Robin define conservatism primarily in terms of a general defense of social and economic inequality. From this perspective, conservatism is less an attempt to uphold old institutions and more "a meditation on—and theoretical rendition of—the felt experience of having power, seeing it threatened, and trying to win it back".

In Conservatism: A Rediscovery (2022), political philosopher Yoram Hazony argues that, in a traditional conservative community, members have importance and influence to the degree they are honored within the social hierarchy, which includes factors such as age, experience, and wisdom. Conservatives often glorify hierarchies, as demonstrated in an aphorism by conservative philosopher Nicolás Gómez Dávila: "Hierarchies are celestial. In hell all are equal." The word hierarchy has religious roots and translates to 'rule of a high priest.'

=== Authority ===
Authority is a core tenet of conservatism. More specifically, conservatives tend to believe in traditional authority. According to sociologist Max Weber, this form of authority is "resting on an established belief in the sanctity of immemorial traditions and the legitimacy of those exercising authority under them". Philosopher Alexandre Kojève distinguishes between two different forms of traditional authority:

- The Authority of the Father—represented by actual fathers as well as conceptual fathers such as priests and monarchs.
- The Authority of the Master—represented by aristocrats and military commanders.

Sociologist Robert Nisbet acknowledges that the decline of traditional authority in the modern world is partly linked with the retreat of old institutions such as guild, order, parish, and family—institutions that formerly acted as intermediaries between the state and the individual. Philosopher Hannah Arendt argues that the modern world suffers an existential crisis with a "dramatic breakdown of all traditional authorities," which are needed for the continuity of an established civilization.

== Historical background ==
Anglo-Irish statesman Edmund Burke has been widely regarded as the philosophical founder of modern conservatism. He served as the private secretary to the Marquess of Rockingham and as official pamphleteer to the Rockingham branch of the Whig party. Together with the Tories, they were the conservatives in the late 18th century United Kingdom.

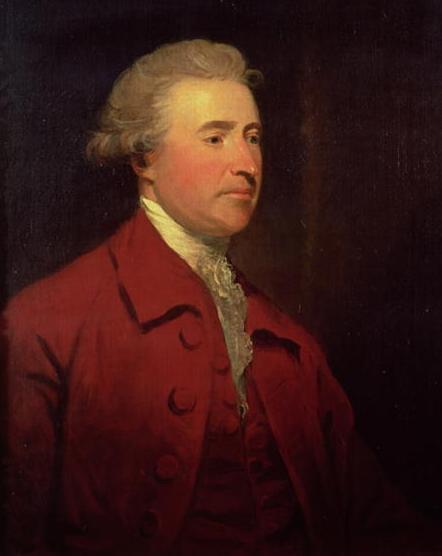
Edmund Burke, widely regarded as the philosophical founder of modern conservatism

Burke's views were a mixture of conservatism and republicanism. He supported the American Revolution of 1775–1783 but abhorred the violence of the French Revolution of 1789–1799. He accepted the ideals of private property and the economics of Adam Smith, but he thought that capitalism should remain subordinate to the conservative social ethic and that the business class should be subordinate to aristocracy. He insisted on standards of honor derived from the medieval aristocratic tradition and saw the aristocracy as the nation's natural leaders. That meant limits on the powers of the Crown, since he found the institutions of Parliament to be better informed than commissions appointed by the executive. He favored an established church, but allowed for a degree of religious toleration. Burke ultimately justified the social order on the basis of tradition: tradition represented the wisdom of the species, and he valued community and social harmony over social reforms.

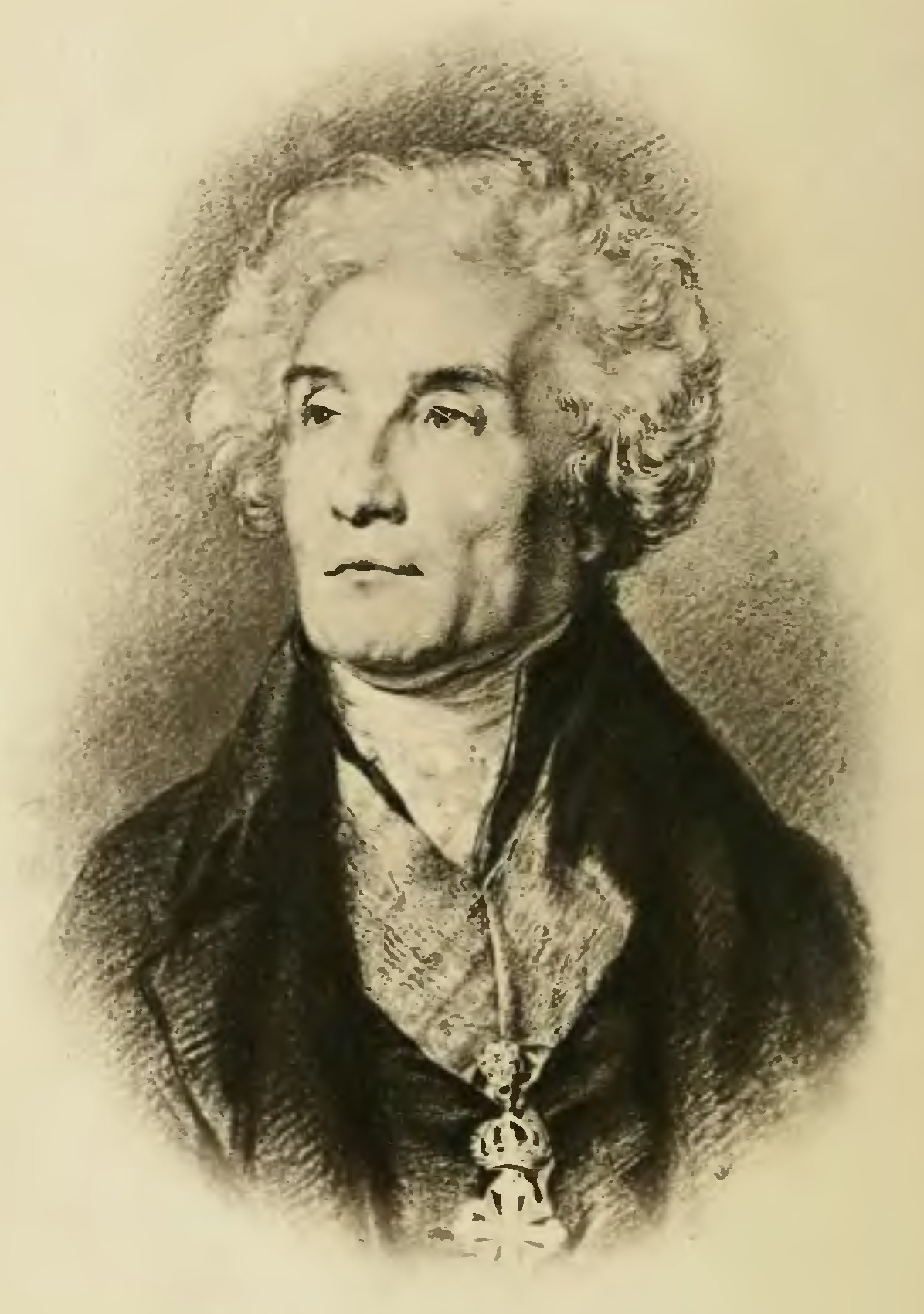
Joseph de Maistre, a French philosopher and proponent of the Counter-Enlightenment

Another form of conservatism developed in France in parallel to conservatism in Britain. It was influenced by Counter-Enlightenment works by philosophers such as Joseph de Maistre and Louis de Bonald. Many continental conservatives do not support separation of church and state, with most supporting state cooperation with the Catholic Church, such as had existed in France before the Revolution. Conservatives were also early to embrace nationalism, which was previously associated with liberalism and the Revolution in France. Another early French conservative, François-René de Chateaubriand, espoused a romantic opposition to modernity, contrasting its emptiness with the 'full heart' of traditional faith and loyalty. Elsewhere on the continent, German thinkers Justus Möser and Friedrich von Gentz criticized the Declaration of the Rights of Man and of the Citizen that came of the Revolution. Opposition was also expressed by German idealists such as Adam Müller and Georg Wilhelm Friedrich Hegel, the latter inspiring both leftist and rightist followers.

Both Burke and Maistre were critical of democracy in general, though their reasons differed. Maistre was pessimistic about humans being able to follow rules, while Burke was skeptical about humans' innate ability to make rules. For Maistre, rules had a divine origin, while Burke believed they arose from custom. The lack of custom for Burke, and the lack of divine guidance for Maistre, meant that people would act in terrible ways. Both also believed that liberty of the wrong kind led to bewilderment and political breakdown. Their ideas would together flow into a stream of anti-rationalist, romantic conservatism, but would still stay separate. Burke was more open to argumentation and disagreement, while Maistre sought faith and authority, leading to a more illiberal strain of thought.

== Ideological variants ==
=== Authoritarian conservatism ===
Authoritarian conservatism refers to autocratic regimes that portray authority as absolute and unquestionable. Authoritarian conservative movements show strong devotion towards religion, tradition, and culture while also expressing fervent nationalism akin to other far-right nationalist movements. Examples of authoritarian conservative dictators include Marshal Philippe Pétain in France, Regent Miklós Horthy in Hungary, General Ioannis Metaxas in Greece, King Alexander I in Yugoslavia, Prime Minister António de Oliveira Salazar in Portugal, Chancellor Engelbert Dollfuss in Austria, Generalissimo Francisco Franco in Spain, King Carol II in Romania, and Tsar Boris III in Bulgaria.

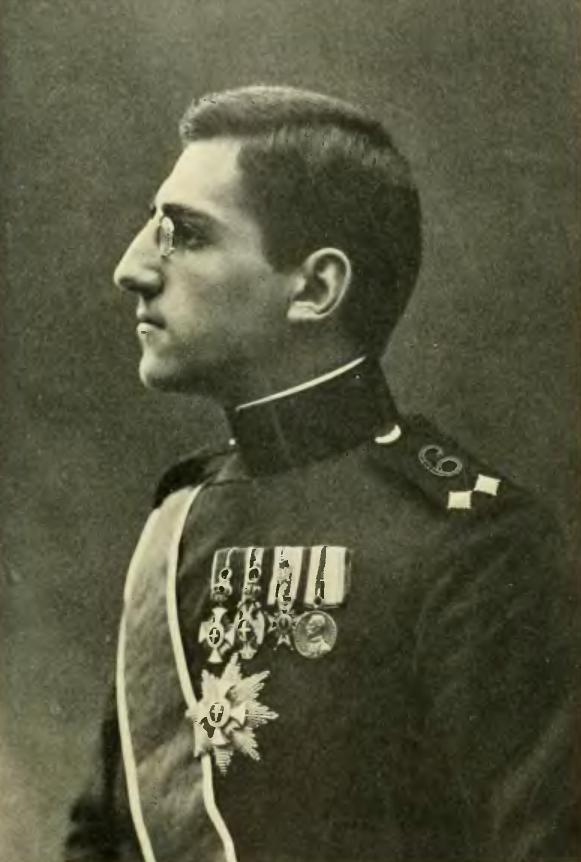
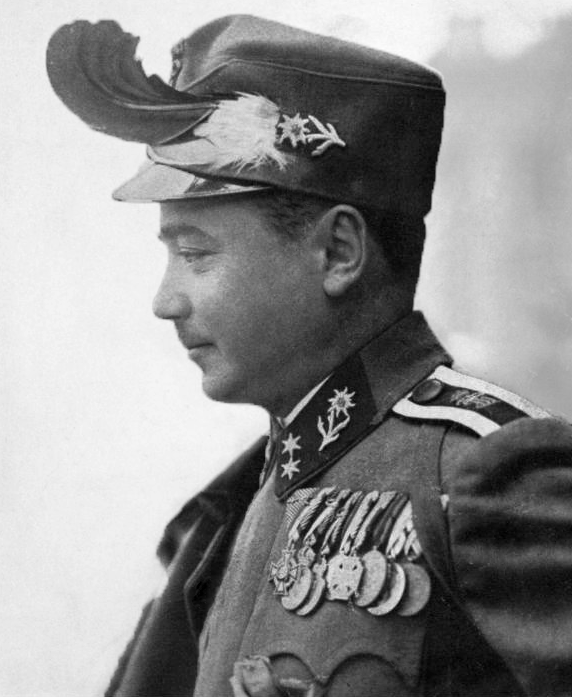
King Alexander I of Yugoslavia and Chancellor Engelbert Dollfuss of Austria, authoritarian conservative dictators who were assassinated by fascist and Nazi political enemies

Authoritarian conservative movements were prominent in the same era as fascism, with which they sometimes clashed. Although both ideologies shared core values such as nationalism and had common enemies such as communism, there was nonetheless a contrast between the traditionalist and elitist nature of authoritarian conservatism and the revolutionary and populist nature of fascism—thus it was common for authoritarian conservative regimes to suppress rising fascist and Nazi movements. The hostility between the two ideologies is highlighted by the struggle for power in Austria, which was marked by the assassination of the ultra-Catholic dictator Engelbert Dollfuss by Austrian Nazis. Likewise, Croatian fascists assassinated King Alexander I of Yugoslavia. In Romania, as the fascist Iron Guard was gaining popularity and Nazi Germany was making advances on the European political stage, King Carol II ordered the execution of Corneliu Zelea Codreanu and other top-ranking Romanian fascists. The exiled German Emperor Wilhelm II was an enemy of Adolf Hitler and stated that Nazism made him ashamed to be a German for the first time in his life. The Catholic seminarian António de Oliveira Salazar, who was Portugal's dictator for 40 years, denounced fascism and Nazism as a "pagan Caesarism" that did not recognize legal, religious, or moral limits.

Political scientist Seymour Martin Lipset has examined the class basis of right-wing extremist politics in the 1920–1960 era. He reports:

Conservative or rightist extremist movements have arisen at different periods in modern history, ranging from the Horthyites in Hungary, the Christian Social Party of Dollfuss in Austria, Der Stahlhelm and other nationalists in pre-Hitler Germany, and Salazar in Portugal, to the pre-1966 Gaullist movements and the monarchists in contemporary France and Italy. The right extremists are conservative, not revolutionary. They seek to change political institutions in order to preserve or restore cultural and economic ones, while extremists of the centre [fascists/Nazis] and left [communists/anarchists] seek to use political means for cultural and social revolution. The ideal of the right extremist is not a totalitarian ruler, but a monarch, or a traditionalist who acts like one. Many such movements in Spain, Austria, Hungary, Germany, and Italy have been explicitly monarchist […] The supporters of these movements differ from those of the centrists, tending to be wealthier, and more religious, which is more important in terms of a potential for mass support.

Edmund Fawcett states that fascism is totalitarian, populist, and anti-pluralist, whereas authoritarian conservatism is somewhat pluralist but most of all elitist and anti-populist. He concludes: "The fascist is a nonconservative who takes anti-liberalism to extremes. The right-wing authoritarian is a conservative who takes fear of democracy to extremes."

During the Cold War, right-wing military dictatorships were prominent in Latin America, with most nations being under military rule by the middle of the 1970s. One example of this was General Augusto Pinochet, who ruled over Chile from 1973 to 1990. According to Erik von Kuehnelt-Leddihn, military dictatorships arise in democratic systems in order to stop leftist parties from becoming totalitarian. The most recent instance occurred in Bolivia in 2024, when General Juan José Zúñiga staged a coup in order to overthrow the far-left president Luis Arce.

In the 21st century, the authoritarian style of government experienced a worldwide renaissance with conservative politicians such as President Vladimir Putin in Russia, President Recep Tayyip Erdoğan in Turkey, Prime Minister Viktor Orbán in Hungary, Prime Minister Narendra Modi in India, and President Donald Trump in the United States.

=== Liberal conservatism ===
Liberal conservatism is a variant of conservatism that is strongly influenced by liberal stances. It incorporates the classical liberal view of minimal economic interventionism, meaning that individuals should be free to participate in the market and generate wealth without government interference. However, individuals cannot be thoroughly depended on to act responsibly in other spheres of life; therefore, liberal conservatives believe that a strong state is necessary to ensure law and order, and social institutions are needed to nurture a sense of duty and responsibility to the nation. Originally opposed to capitalism and the Industrial Revolution, the conservative ideology in many countries adopted economic liberalism, especially in the United States where this ideology is known as fiscal conservatism.

=== National conservatism ===
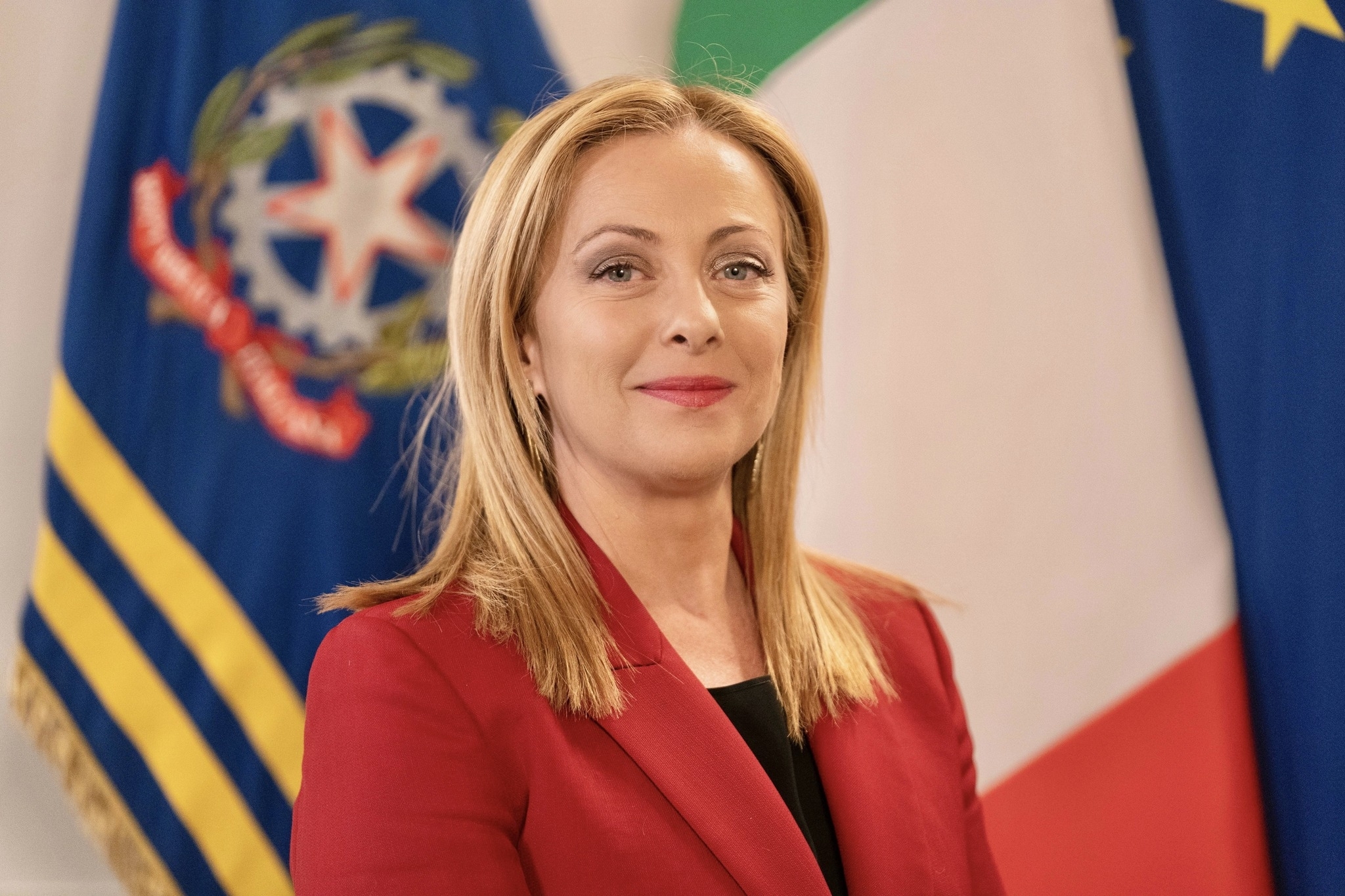
Giorgia Meloni—leader of the national-conservative party Brothers of Italy, the first female Prime Minister of Italy, and president of the European Conservatives and Reformists Party

National conservatism prioritizes the defense of national and cultural identity, often based on a theory of the family as a model for the state. National conservatism is oriented towards upholding national sovereignty, which includes limited immigration and a strong national defense. In Europe, national conservatives are usually eurosceptics. Political philosopher Yoram Hazony has argued for national conservatism in his work The Virtue of Nationalism (2018).

=== Paternalistic conservatism ===
Paternalistic conservatism is a strand in conservatism which reflects the belief that societies exist and develop organically and that members within them have obligations towards each other. There is particular emphasis on the paternalistic obligation (noblesse oblige) of those who are privileged and wealthy to the poorer parts of society, which is consistent with principles such as duty, organicism, and hierarchy. Its proponents often stress the importance of a social safety net to deal with poverty, supporting limited redistribution of wealth along with government regulation of markets in the interests of both consumers and producers.

Paternalistic conservatism first arose as a distinct ideology in the United Kingdom under Prime Minister Benjamin Disraeli's "One Nation" Toryism. There have been a variety of one-nation conservative governments in the United Kingdom with exponents such as Prime Ministers Disraeli, Stanley Baldwin, Neville Chamberlain, Winston Churchill, and Harold Macmillan.

In 19th-century Germany, Chancellor Otto von Bismarck adopted a set of social programs, known as state socialism, which included insurance for workers against sickness, accident, incapacity, and old age. The goal of this conservative state-building strategy was to make ordinary Germans, not just the Junker aristocracy, more loyal to state and Emperor. Chancellor Leo von Caprivi promoted a conservative agenda called the "New Course".

=== Progressive conservatism ===
In the United States, President Theodore Roosevelt has been identified as the main exponent of progressive conservatism. Roosevelt stated that he had "always believed that wise progressivism and wise conservatism go hand in hand". The Republican administration of President William Howard Taft was progressive conservative, and he described himself as a believer in progressive conservatism. President Dwight D. Eisenhower also declared himself an advocate of progressive conservatism.

In Canada, a variety of conservative governments have been part of the Red Tory tradition, with Canada's former major conservative party being named the Progressive Conservative Party of Canada from 1942 to 2003. Prime Ministers Arthur Meighen, R. B. Bennett, John Diefenbaker, Joe Clark, Brian Mulroney, and Kim Campbell led Red Tory federal governments.

=== Reactionary conservatism ===
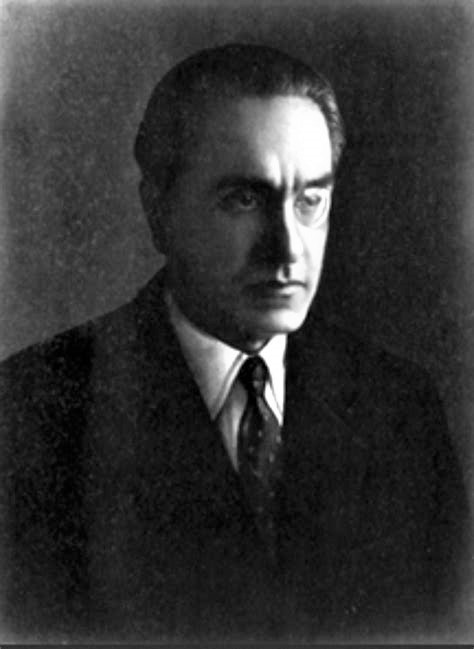
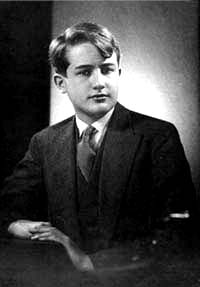
Italian esotericist Julius Evola and Colombian aphorist Nicolás Gómez Dávila—prominent reactionary critics of modernity

Reactionary conservatism, also known as reactionism, opposes policies for the social transformation of society. In popular usage, reactionism refers to a staunch traditionalist conservative political perspective of a person who supports the status quo and opposes social, political, and economic change. Some adherents of conservatism, rather than opposing change, seek to return to the status quo ante and tend to view the modern world in a negative light, especially concerning mass culture and secularism, although different groups of reactionaries may choose different traditional values to revive.

Some political scientists, such as Corey Robin, treat the words reactionary and conservative as synonyms. Others, such as Mark Lilla, argue that reactionism and conservatism are distinct worldviews. Francis Wilson defines conservatism as "a philosophy of social evolution, in which certain lasting values are defended within the framework of the tension of political conflict".

Some reactionaries favor a return to the status quo ante, the previous political state of society, which that person believes possessed positive characteristics absent from contemporary society. An early example of a powerful reactionary movement was German Romanticism, which centered around concepts of organicism, medievalism, and traditionalism against the forces of rationalism, secularism, and individualism that were unleashed in the French Revolution.

In political discourse, being a reactionary is generally regarded as negative; Peter King observed that it is "an unsought-for label, used as a torment rather than a badge of honor". Despite this, the descriptor has been adopted by intellectuals such as Italian esoteric traditionalist Julius Evola, Austrian monarchist Erik von Kuehnelt-Leddihn, Colombian political theologian Nicolás Gómez Dávila, and American historian John Lukacs.

=== Religious conservatism ===
Religious conservatism principally applies the teachings of particular religions to politics—sometimes by merely proclaiming the value of those teachings, at other times by having those teachings influence laws. In most democracies, political conservatism seeks to uphold traditional family structures and social values. Religious conservatives typically oppose abortion, LGBT behavior (or, in certain cases, identity), drug use, and sexual activity outside of marriage. In some cases, conservative values are grounded in religious beliefs, and conservatives seek to increase the role of religion in public life.

Christian democracy is an ideology inspired by Christian social teaching. In Europe, Christian democratic parties generally tend to be moderately conservative, with some being the main conservative party in their respective countries. It originated as a reaction against the industrialization and urbanization associated with laissez-faire-capitalism. In post-war Europe, Christian-democratic parties dominated politics in several nations—the Christian People's Party in Belgium, CDU and CSU in Germany, Fine Gael and Fianna Fáil in Ireland, and Christian Democracy in Italy. Many post-war Europeans saw Christian democracy as a moderate alternative to the extremes of right-wing nationalism and left-wing communism. Christian-democratic parties were especially popular among European women, who often voted for these parties to a large extent due to their pro-family policies.

=== Social conservatism ===
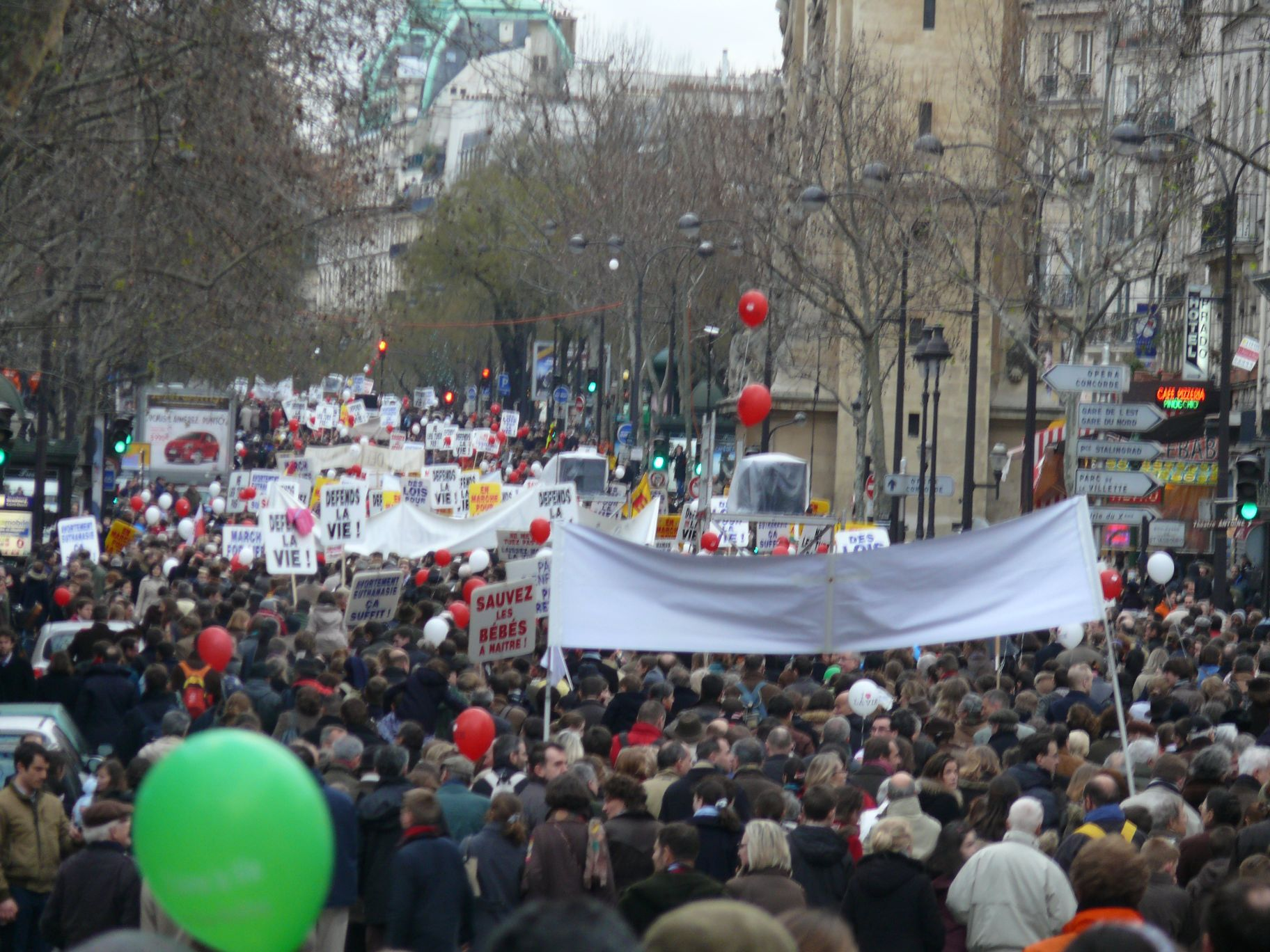
A March for Life rally in Paris in 2012

Social conservatives believe that society is built upon a fragile network of relationships which need to be upheld through duty, traditional values, and established institutions; and that the government has a role in encouraging or enforcing traditional values or practices. A social conservative wants to preserve traditional morality and social mores, often by opposing what they consider radical policies or social engineering. Some social-conservative stances are the following:

- Support of a culture of life and opposition to the destruction of human life at any stage, including abortion, embryonic stem cells research, and euthanasia.
- Support of bioconservatism and opposition to both eugenics and transhumanism.
- Support of traditional family values, viewing the nuclear family model as society's foundational unit.
- Support of a traditional definition of marriage as being one man and one woman, and opposition to expansion of civil marriage and child adoption to couples in same-sex relationships.
- Support of public morality with prohibition of drugs and prostitution and censorship of pornography.
- Support of organized religion and opposition to atheism and secularism, especially when militant.

=== Traditionalist conservatism ===
Traditionalist conservatism, also known as classical conservatism, emphasizes the need for the principles of natural law, transcendent moral order, tradition, hierarchy, organicism, agrarianism, classicism, and high culture as well as the intersecting spheres of loyalty. Some traditionalists have embraced the labels reactionary and counter-revolutionary, defying the stigma that has attached to these terms since the Enlightenment. Having a hierarchical view of society, many traditionalist conservatives, including a few notable Americans such as Ralph Adams Cram, William S. Lind, and Charles A. Coulombe, defend the monarchical political structure as the most natural and beneficial social arrangement.

== National variants ==
Conservative parties vary widely from country to country in the goals they wish to achieve. Both conservative and classical liberal parties tend to favor private ownership of property, in opposition to communist, socialist, and green parties, which favor communal ownership or laws regulating responsibility on the part of property owners. Where conservatives and liberals differ is primarily on social issues, where conservatives tend to reject behavior that does not conform to some social norm. Modern conservative parties often define themselves by their opposition to liberal or socialist parties. The United States usage of the term conservative is unique to that country, where its first modern usage was for pro-free enterprise opponents of the New Deal.

=== Asia ===
Conservatism in Asia differs according to regions. East Asia and some Southeast Asian regions are deeply linked to Confucian traditions.

Asian values is a political ideology that attempts to define elements of society, culture and history common to the nations of Southeast and East Asia, particularly values of commonality and collectivism for social unity and economic good—contrasting with perceived European ideals of the universal rights of all individuals.

==== China ====
Chinese conservatism can be traced back to Confucius, whose philosophy is based on the values of loyalty, duty, and respect. He believed in a hierarchically organized society, modeled after the patriarchal family and headed by an absolute sovereign. However, Confucius also believed that the state should employ a meritocratic class of administrators and advisers, recruited by civil service exams. An alternative school of thought called Legalism argued that administrative discipline, not Confucian virtue, was crucial for the governance of the state.

For thousands of years, China was ruled by monarchs of various imperial dynasties. The Mandate of Heaven theory was invoked in order to legitimize the absolute authority of the Emperor. The Xinhai Revolution of 1911 overthrew Puyi, the last Chinese Emperor, and ushered in the Beiyang government. Between 1927 and 1949, China was ruled by the nationalist party Kuomintang, which became right-wing after General Chiang Kai-shek purged communists from his party. Following his defeat in the Chinese Civil War by the Chinese Communist Party (CCP), Chiang continued ruling the island of Taiwan until his death in 1975.

On the mainland, Chinese conservatism was vehemently opposed and suppressed by the CCP, especially during the Cultural Revolution. Members of the "Five Black Categories"—landlords, rich farmers, counter-revolutionaries, bad influencers, and right-wingers—were violently persecuted. Young people formed cadres of Red Guards throughout the country and sought to destroy the Four Olds: old ideas, old culture, old customs, and old habits—leading to the destruction of a large part of China's cultural heritage, including historical artifacts and religious sites. Among them, some Red Guards who embraced local officials were pejoratively called "conservatives".

In recent decades, Chinese conservatism has experienced a national revival. The ancient schools of Confucianism and Legalism have made a return into mainstream Chinese thought. Wang Huning, widely regarded as the grey eminence and chief ideologue of the CCP, has criticized aspects of Marxism and recommended that China combine its historical and modern values. General Secretary Xi Jinping has called traditional Chinese culture the "soul" of the nation and the "foundation" of the CCP. China has also developed a form of authoritarian capitalism in recent years, further breaking with the orthodox communism of its past. Neoauthoritarianism is a current of political thought that advocates a powerful state to facilitate market reforms. A major concern of modern Chinese conservatism is the preservation of traditional culture.

==== India ====
Indian politics has long been dominated by aristocratic and religious elites in one of the most hierarchically stratified nations in the world. In modern times, the Bharatiya Janata Party (BJP), led by Narendra Modi, represents conservative politics. With over 170 million members as of October 2022, the BJP is by far the world's largest political party. It promotes Hindu nationalism, quasi-fascist Hindutva, a hostile foreign policy against Pakistan, a hostile domestic policy against Muslims in India and a conservative social and fiscal policy. The BJP movement is both elitist and populist, attracting privileged groups that fear encroachment on their dominant positions as well as "plebeian" groups that seek recognition around a majoritarian rhetoric of cultural pride, social order, and national strength.

==== Iran ====
The Pahlavi dynasty replaced the Qajar dynasty in 1925 after a coup d'état, ruling Iran as a constitutional monarchy from 1925 until 1953 and then as an autocratic monarchy from the U.S.-instigated 1953 coup d'état until 1979. In an attempt to introduce reform from above while preserving traditional relations of hierarchy, the Shah, Mohammad Reza Pahlavi, launched the White Revolution in 1963 as a series of reforms of aggressive modernization, resulting in a great redistribution of wealth from the aristocratic landlord class to Iran's working class and explosive economic growth in subsequent decades. The Iranian Revolution of 1979, supported by the clergy and the aristocracy, overthrew the monarchy and transformed the Imperial State of Iran to the Islamic Republic of Iran, thus replacing the progressive conservatism of the Shah monarchy with the reactionary conservatism of Islamic theocracy. The two main political camps in today's Iran are hard-line conservative "Principlists" and Islamic liberal "Reformists".

==== Israel ====
After the declaration of the State of Israel, politics was initially dominated by left-wing parties, but overtime, right-wing parties became increasingly powerful, with conservatism now being the dominant ideology. In the 2022 election, right-wing parties received 75 percent of the popular vote, a centrist party 17 percent, and left-wing parties 7 percent, and the subsequent government has been variously described as the most right-wing, as well as the most religious, in Israeli history.

Israeli conservatism is based around upholding Jewish culture, Jewish religious traditions, promotion of forms of Zionism that tend to be more irredentist in nature (i. e. Revisionist and Neo-Zionism, which promote the idea of Greater Israel, as compared to Liberal or Labor Zionism, which are supportive of a two-state solution), promoting Israeli national security, maintaining the role of religion and the Rabbinate in the public sphere, support for the free market, and close ties with the United States.

==== Japan ====
Conservatism has been the dominant political ideology throughout modern Japanese history. The right-wing conservative Liberal Democratic Party has been the dominant ruling party since 1955, often referred to as the 1955 System. Therefore, some experts consider Japan a democratically elected one-party state since the populace always votes for the same conservative party.

Up until 1868, Japan was largely a feudal state ruled by members of the aristocratic Samurai order with its bushido code of honor. In the Meiji era, a process of modernization, industrialization, and nationalization was initiated. Power struggles between the old decentralized Samurai aristocracy and the new centralized imperial monarchy culminated in the Satsuma Rebellion in 1877 with imperial victory. During the era of World War II, Japan was transformed into an ultranationalist, imperialist state that conquered much of east and southeast Asia. Contemporary conservatives, notably during the second premiership of Shinzo Abe from 2012 to 2020, advocate for revising the country's constitution, particularly Article 9 which renounces war and prohibits Japan from maintaining a military.

Japan is the oldest continuing monarchy in the history of mankind, with Naruhito currently serving as Emperor of Japan. In accordance with the principle of monarchy, Japanese society has an authoritarian family structure with a traditionalist fatherly authority that is primarily transferred to the oldest son.

Anti-communist and anti-Chinese sentiment is widespread in Japan. In 1925 the Peace Preservation Law was enacted with the aim of allowing the Special Higher Police to suppress socialists and communists more effectively. In 1936 the Empire of Japan and Nazi Germany opposed the Communist International by signing the Anti-Comintern Pact—a pact later joined by the Kingdom of Italy, Francoist Spain, and the Kingdom of Hungary. The Japanese term tenkō refers to the coerced ideological conversions of Japanese socialists who were induced to renounce leftist ideology and enthusiastically embrace the monarchist, capitalist, and imperialist ideology favored by the state. In the late 1940s and early 1950s, during the Red Purge, tens of thousands of supporters of left-wing groups, especially those affiliated with the Japanese Communist Party, were removed from their jobs in government, schools, and universities.

Nippon Kaigi is an ultraconservative and ultranationalist organization that exerts a significant influence over contemporary Japanese politics. In 2014, a majority of National Diet members were part of the group. Many ministers and a few prime ministers, including Fumio Kishida, Tarō Asō, Shinzō Abe, and Yoshihide Suga, have been members.

A highly developed and industrialized nation, Japan is more capitalistic and Western-oriented than other Asian nations. Therefore, some experts consider Japan part of the Western world. In 1960 a treaty was signed that established a military alliance between the United States and Japan. However, the ultraconservative reactionary traditionalist Yukio Mishima feared that his fellow Japanese were too enamored of modernization and Western-style capitalism to protect traditional Japanese culture.

==== Singapore ====
Singapore's conservative party is the People's Action Party (PAP), which promotes conservative values in the form of Asian democracy and Asian values. These values include: nation before community and society above self; family as the basic unit of society; regard and community support for the individual; consensus instead of contention, and racial and religious harmony. They are a contrast against the "more Westernised, individualistic, and self-centred outlook on life" and uphold the "traditional Asian ideas of morality, duty and society".

The PAP is currently in government and has been since independence in 1965. Having governed for over six decades, the PAP is the longest uninterrupted governing party among modern multiparty parliamentary democracies. Singapore is a city state and has a reputation as a nanny state, owing to the considerable number of government regulations and restrictions on its citizens' lives. Former Prime Minister Lee Kuan Yew, the architect of the modern Singapore, observed: "If Singapore is a nanny state, then I am proud to have fostered one". In an interview in the Straits Times in 1987, Lee said:

I am often accused of interfering in the private lives of citizens. Yes, if I did not, had I not done that, we wouldn't be here today. And I say without the slightest remorse, that we wouldn't be here, we would not have made economic progress, if we had not intervened on very personal matters–who your neighbour is, how you live, the noise you make, how you spit, or what language you use. We decide what is right. Never mind what the people think.

==== South Korea ====
Conservatism has been the dominant political ideology throughout Korean history. Syngman Rhee was a staunch anti-communist and became the first President of South Korea upon the nation founding in 1948. South Korean army general Park Chung Hee seized power in the May 16 coup of 1961, after which he was elected as the third President. He introduced the highly authoritarian Yushin Constitution, ushering in the Fourth Republic. He ruled the country as a dictator until his assassination in 1979.

Right-wing conservative parties have dominated South Korean politics for most of its modern history, while the main opposition parties have been moderate centrist and not left-wing. South Korea's major conservative party, the People Power Party, has changed its form over the years. Its predecessor, the Democratic-Liberal Party was led by Roh Tae-woo, who was the first democratically elected president. The party was founded by the merging of Roh Tae-woo's Democratic Justice Party, Kim Young Sam's Reunification Democratic Party and Kim Jong-pil's New Democratic Republican Party. Kim Young-sam later became the seventh President of Korea.

When the conservative party was beaten by the opposition party in the general election of 1996, it became the New Korea Party, but it changed again to the Grand National Party (GNP) a year later. Since the late Kim Dae-jung assumed the presidency in 1998, GNP had been the opposition party until Lee Myung-bak won the presidential election of 2007.

Park Geun-hye succeeded Lee in the presidential election of 2012 till her impeachment in 2017. Yoon Suk Yeol won the presidential election of 2022 by the narrowest margin since democratization till his impeachment in 2025.

=== Europe ===
European conservatism has taken many different expressions. Early forms were often reactionary and romantic, idealizing the Middle Ages and its feudal social order with aristocratic rule and an established church. In the late 19th century, conservatism became increasingly progressive, adopting capitalism and espousing nationalism—which up until now had been anti-traditionalist and anti-imperialist forces. During the first half of the 20th century, as socialist movements were becoming more powerful and the Tsarist regime was overthrown in the Russian Revolution, conservatism in Austria, Germany, Greece, Hungary, Italy, Portugal, Spain, and Romania transformed into the far-right, becoming more authoritarian and extreme. In the post-war era, conservatism assumed a more moderate form with center-right Christian-democratic parties dominating politics across Western Europe throughout the rest of the century, although the authoritarian regimes of Francoist Spain and Salazarian Portugal survived for a few more decades. Towards the end of the century, after the collapse of the Soviet Union, conservatism took on a more liberal form. In recent decades, nationalist parties have been on the rise across Europe in opposition to globalism.

European countries, with the exception of Switzerland, have had a long monarchical tradition throughout history. Today, existing monarchies are Andorra, Belgium, Denmark, Liechtenstein, Luxembourg, Monaco, the Netherlands, Norway, Spain, Sweden, and the United Kingdom. Some reactionary movements in republican nations, such as Action Française in France, the Monarchist National Party in Italy, and the Black-Yellow Alliance in Austria, have advocated a restoration of the monarchy.

==== Austria ====
Austrian conservatism originated with Prince Klemens von Metternich, who was the architect behind the monarchist and imperialist Conservative Order that was enacted at the Congress of Vienna in the aftermath of the French Revolution and the Napoleonic Wars. The goal was to establish a European balance of power that could guarantee peace and suppress republican and nationalist movements. During its existence, the Austrian Empire was the third most populous monarchy in Europe after the Russian Empire and the United Kingdom. Following its defeat in the Austro-Prussian War, it transformed into the Austro-Hungarian Empire, which was the most diverse state in Europe with twelve nationalities living under a unifying monarch. The Empire was fragmented in the aftermath of World War I, ushering in the democratic First Austrian Republic.

The Austrian Civil War in 1934 saw a series of skirmishes between the right-wing government and socialist forces. When the insurgents were defeated, the government declared martial law and held mass trials, forcing leading socialist politicians, such as Otto Bauer, into exile. The conservatives banned the Social Democratic Party and replaced parliamentary democracy with a corporatist and clerical constitution. The Fatherland Front, into which the paramilitary Heimwehr and the Christian Social Party were merged, became the only legal political party in the resulting authoritarian regime, the Federal State of Austria.

While having close ties to Fascist Italy, which was still a monarchy as well as a fellow Catholic nation, Austrian conservatives harbored strong anti-Prussian and anti-Nazi sentiment. Austria's most prominent conservative intellectual, the Catholic aristocrat Erik von Kuehnelt-Leddihn, published several books in which he interpreted Nazism as a leftist, ochlocratic, and demagogic ideology opposed to the traditional rightist ideals of aristocracy, monarchy, and Christianity. Austria's dictator Engelbert Dollfuss saw Nazism as another form of totalitarian communism, and he saw Adolf Hitler as the German version of Joseph Stalin. The conservatives banned the Austrian Nazi Party and arrested many of its activists, causing tens of thousands of Nazi sympathizers to flee to Nazi Germany in order to avoid persecution. A few months later, Nazi forces initiated the July Putsch and managed to assassinate Chancellor Dollfuss in an attempt to overthrow the conservative government. In response, Benito Mussolini mobilized a part of the Italian army on the Austrian border and threatened Hitler with war in the event of a German invasion of Austria. In 1938, when Nazi Germany annexed Austria in the Anschluss, conservative groups were suppressed: members of the Austrian nobility and the Catholic clergy were arrested and their properties were confiscated. Otto von Hapsburg, the last Crown Prince of Austria-Hungary, was a fervent anti-Nazi, for which reason the Nazi regime ordered that he was to be executed immediately if caught.

Following World War II and the return to democracy, Austrian conservatives and socialists alike abandoned their extremism, believing in political compromise and seeking consensus in the middle. The conservatives formed the Austrian People's Party, which has been the major conservative party in Austria ever since. In contemporary politics, the party was led by Sebastian Kurz, whom the Frankfurter Allgemeine Zeitung nicknamed the "young Metternich".

==== Belgium ====
Having its roots in the conservative Catholic Party, the Christian People's Party retained a conservative edge through the 20th century, supporting the King in the Royal Question, supporting nuclear family as the cornerstone of society, defending Christian education, and opposing euthanasia. The Christian People's Party dominated politics in post-war Belgium. In 1999, the party's support collapsed, and it became the country's fifth-largest party. Since 2014, the Flemish nationalist and conservative New Flemish Alliance is the largest party in Belgium.

==== Denmark ====
Danish conservatism emerged with the political grouping Højre (lit. 'Right'), which due to its alliance with King Christian IX of Denmark dominated Danish politics and formed all governments from 1865 to 1901. When a constitutional reform in 1915 stripped the landed gentry of political power, Højre was succeeded by the Conservative People's Party of Denmark, which has since then been the main Danish conservative party. Another Danish conservative party was the Free Conservatives, who were active between 1902 and 1920. Traditionally and historically, conservatism in Denmark has been more populist and agrarian than in Sweden and Norway, where conservatism has been more elitist and urban.

The Conservative People's Party led the government coalition from 1982 to 1993. The party had previously been member of various governments from 1916 to 1917, 1940 to 1945, 1950 to 1953, and 1968 to 1971. The party was a junior partner in governments led by the Liberals from 2001 to 2011 and again from 2016 to 2019. The party is preceded by 11 years by the Young Conservatives (KU), today the youth movement of the party.

The Conservative People's Party had a stable electoral support close to 15 to 20% at almost all general elections from 1918 to 1971. In the 1970s it declined to around 5%, but then under the leadership of Poul Schlüter reached its highest popularity level ever in 1984, receiving 23% of the votes. Since the late 1990s the party has obtained around 5 to 10% of the vote. In the 2026 Danish general election, the party received 7.6% of the vote.

Conservative thinking has also influenced other Danish political parties. In 1995, the Danish People's Party was founded, based on a mixture of conservative, nationalist, and social-democratic ideas. In 2007, the party Liberal Alliance was established, combining liberal and conservative political ideas. In 2022, the party Danmarksdemokraterne was founded, describing itself as a party rooted in national, liberal, and conservative values.

At the 2026 general election, parties commonly described as influenced by conservative ideas—including the Conservative People's Party, the Danish People's Party, Liberal Alliance, and Danmarksdemokraterne—together received approximately 31.9% of the vote.

The conservative parties in Denmark have always considered the monarchy a central institution in Denmark.

==== Finland ====
The conservative party in Finland is the National Coalition Party. The party was founded in 1918, when several monarchist parties united. Although right-wing in the past, today it is a moderate liberal-conservative party. While advocating economic liberalism, it is committed to the social market economy.

There has been strong anti-Russian and anti-communist sentiment in Finland due to its long history of being invaded and conquered by Russia and the Soviet Union. In the Finnish Civil War of 1918, White Finland defeated the leftist Red Finland. The Finnish Defence Forces and the paramilitary White Guard, led by Baron Carl Gustaf Emil Mannerheim, were assisted by the German Imperial Army at the request of the Finnish civil government. The far-right Lapua movement continued to terrorize communists in post-war Finland, but it was banned after a failed coup d'état attempt in 1932.

==== France ====
Early conservatism in France focused on the rejection of the secularism of the French Revolution, support for the role of the Catholic Church, and the restoration of the monarchy. After the first fall of Napoleon in 1814, the House of Bourbon returned to power in the Bourbon Restoration. Louis XVIII and Charles X, brothers of the executed King Louis XVI, successively mounted the throne and instituted a conservative government intended to restore the proprieties, if not all the institutions, of the Ancien Régime.

After the July Revolution of 1830, Louis Philippe I, a member of the more liberal Orléans branch of the House of Bourbon, proclaimed himself as King of the French. The Second French Empire saw an Imperial Bonapartist regime of Napoleon III from 1852 to 1870. The Bourbon monarchist cause was on the verge of victory in the 1870s, but then collapsed because the proposed king, Henri, Count of Chambord, refused to fly the tri-colored flag. The turn of the century saw the rise of Action Française—an ultraconservative, reactionary, nationalist, and royalist movement that advocated a restoration of the monarchy.

Tensions between Christian rightists and secular leftists heightened in the 1890–1910 era, but moderated after the spirit of unity in fighting World War I. An authoritarian form of conservatism characterized the Vichy regime of 1940–1944 under Marshal Philippe Pétain with heightened antisemitism, opposition to individualism, emphasis on family life, and national direction of the economy.

Conservatism has been the major political force in France since World War II, although the number of conservative groups and their lack of stability defy simple categorization. Following the war, conservatives supported Gaullist groups and parties, espoused nationalism, and emphasized tradition, social order, and the regeneration of France. Unusually, post-war conservatism in France was formed around the personality of a leader—army general and aristocrat Charles de Gaulle who led the Free French Forces against Nazi Germany—and it did not draw on traditional French conservatism, but on the Bonapartist tradition. Gaullism in France continues under The Republicans (formerly Union for a Popular Movement), a party previously led by Nicolas Sarkozy, who served as President of France from 2007 to 2012 and whose ideology is known as Sarkozysm.

In 2021, the French intellectual Éric Zemmour founded the nationalist party Reconquête, which has been described as a more rightist version of Marine Le Pen's National Rally.

==== Germany ====
Germany was the heart of the reactionary Romantic movement that swept Europe in the aftermath of the progressive Age of Enlightenment and its culmination in the anti-conservative French Revolution. German Romanticism was deeply organicist and medievalist, finding expression philosophically among the Old Hegelians and judicially in the German historical school. Prominent conservative exponents were Friedrich Schlegel, Novalis, Wilhelm Heinrich Wackenroder, Friedrich Carl von Savigny, and Adam Müller.

During the second half of the 19th century, German conservatism developed alongside nationalism, culminating in Germany's victory over France in the Franco-Prussian War, the creation of the unified German Empire in 1871, and the simultaneous rise of ”Iron Chancellor” Otto von Bismarck on the European political stage. Bismarck's balance of power model maintained peace in Europe for decades at the end of the 19th century. His "revolutionary conservatism" was a conservative state-building strategy, based on class collaboration and designed to make ordinary Germans—not just the Junker aristocracy—more loyal to state and Emperor. He created the modern welfare state in Germany in the 1880s. According to scholars, his strategy was:

granting social rights to enhance the integration of a hierarchical society, to forge a bond between workers and the state so as to strengthen the latter, to maintain traditional relations of authority between social and status groups, and to provide a countervailing power against the modernist forces of liberalism and socialism.

Bismarck also enacted universal manhood suffrage in the new German Empire in 1871. He became a great hero to German conservatives, who erected many monuments to his memory after he left office in 1890.

During the interwar period—after Germany's defeat in World War I, the abdication of Emperor Wilhelm II, and the introduction of parliamentary democracy—German conservatives experienced a cultural crisis and felt uprooted by a progressively modernist world. This angst was expressed philosophically in the Conservative Revolution movement with prominent exponents such as historian Oswald Spengler, jurist Carl Schmitt, and author Ernst Jünger. The major conservative party of this era was the reactionary German National People's Party, who advocated a restored monarchy.

With the rise of Nazism in 1933, traditional agrarian movements faded and were supplanted by a more command-based economy and forced social integration. Adolf Hitler succeeded in garnering the support of many German industrialists; but prominent traditionalists, including military officers Claus von Stauffenberg and Henning von Tresckow, pastor Dietrich Bonhoeffer, Bishop Clemens August Graf von Galen, and monarchist Carl Friedrich Goerdeler, openly and secretly opposed his policies of euthanasia, genocide, and attacks on organized religion. The former German Emperor Wilhelm II was highly critical of Hitler, writing in 1938:

There's a man alone, without family, without children, without God ... He builds legions, but he doesn't build a nation. A nation is created by families, a religion, traditions: it is made up out of the hearts of mothers, the wisdom of fathers, the joy and the exuberance of children ... This man could bring home victories to our people each year, without bringing them either glory or danger. But of our Germany, which was a nation of poets and musicians, of artists and soldiers, he has made a nation of hysterics and hermits, engulfed in a mob and led by a thousand liars or fanatics.

Post-World War II Germany developed a special form of conservatism called ordoliberalism, which is centered around the concept of ordered liberty. Neither socialist nor capitalist, it promotes a compromise between state and market, and argues that the national culture of a country must be taken into account when implementing economic policies. Alexander Rüstow and Wilhelm Röpke were two prominent exponents of this economic theory, and its implementation is largely credited as a reason behind the German miracle—the rapid reconstruction and development of the war-wrecked economies of West Germany and Austria after World War II.

More recently, the work of conservative Christian Democratic Union leader and Chancellor Helmut Kohl helped bring about German reunification, along with the closer European integration in the form of the Maastricht Treaty. Today, German conservatism is often associated with politicians such as Chancellor Angela Merkel, whose tenure was marked by attempts to save the common European currency (Euro) from demise. The German conservatives were divided under Merkel due to the refugee crisis in Germany, and many conservatives in the CDU/CSU opposed the immigration policies developed under Merkel. The 2020s also saw the rise of the right-wing populist Alternative for Germany.

==== Greece ====
The main inter-war conservative party was called the People's Party (PP), which supported constitutional monarchy and opposed the republican Liberal Party. Both parties were suppressed by the authoritarian, arch-conservative, and royalist 4th of August Regime of General Ioannis Metaxas in 1936–1941. The PP was able to re-group after World War II as part of a United Nationalist Front which achieved power campaigning on a simple anti-communist, nationalist platform during the Greek Civil War in 1946–1949. However, the vote received by the PP declined during the so-called "Centrist Interlude" in 1950–1952.

In 1952, Marshal Alexandros Papagos created the Greek Rally as an umbrella for the right-wing forces. The Greek Rally came to power in 1952 and remained the leading party in Greece until 1963. After Papagos' death in 1955, it was reformed as the National Radical Union under Konstantinos Karamanlis. Right-wing governments backed by the palace and the army overthrew the Centre Union government in 1965 and governed the country until the establishment of the far-right Greek junta (1967–1974). After the regime's collapse in August 1974, Karamanlis returned from exile to lead the government and founded the New Democracy party. The new conservative party had four objectives: to confront Turkish expansionism in Cyprus, to reestablish and solidify democratic rule, to give the country a strong government, and to make a powerful moderate party a force in Greek politics.

The Independent Greeks, a newly formed political party in Greece, has also supported conservatism, particularly national and religious conservatism. The Founding Declaration of the Independent Greeks strongly emphasizes the preservation of the Greek state and its sovereignty, the Greek people, and the Greek Orthodox Church.

==== Hungary ====
Contemporary conservatism and liberalism in Hungary have their origins in the long debates during the Hungarian Reform Era, primarily between the conservative but reformist István Széchenyi and the liberal and revolutionary Lajos Kossuth. Széchenyi favored policies such as concern for the aristocracy in Hungary, preserving Hungary's autonomy within the Habsburg Realm, limited suffrage for wealthy and educated men, promoting a more isolationist foreign policy, and supporting British-style laissez-faire economics. All of this contrasts Kossuth's demands for a republican form of government, full Hungarian independence, universal suffrage, a liberal-internationalist foreign policy, and protectionist economics to develop industry. The Conservative Party was founded in 1846, initially as a rival to the Opposition Party of Kossuth and Lajos Batthyány, founded in 1847, but became allies during the Hungarian Revolution of 1848 and eventually merged into the Opposition Party after Hungarian independence and the founding of the brief Hungarian State in 1849.

The dominance of the political right of inter-war Hungary, after the collapse of a short-lived communist regime, was described by historian István Deák:

Between 1919 and 1944 Hungary was a rightist country. Forged out of a counter-revolutionary heritage, its governments advocated a "nationalist Christian" policy; they extolled heroism, faith, and unity; they despised the French Revolution, and they spurned the liberal and socialist ideologies of the 19th century. The governments saw Hungary as a bulwark against bolshevism and bolshevism's instruments: socialism, cosmopolitanism, and Freemasonry. They perpetrated the rule of a small clique of aristocrats, civil servants, and army officers, and surrounded with adulation the head of the state, the counterrevolutionary Admiral Horthy.

Horthy's authoritarian conservative regime suppressed communists and fascists alike, banning the Hungarian Communist Party as well as the fascist Arrow Cross Party. The fascist leader Ferenc Szálasi was repeatedly imprisoned at Horthy's command.

Since 2010, Viktor Orbán of the Fidesz party has been Prime Minister of Hungary. Orbán's positions are a blend of soft Euroscepticism, right-wing populism, and national conservatism. Zsolt Enyedi has argued that illiberal conservatism plays a major role in Fidesz's ideology. Multiple expressions of conservative ideology has also been found within the 2011 Constitution of Hungary.

CPAC Hungary is an annual political conference, The first CPAC Hungary took place in 2022.

==== Iceland ====
Founded in 1924 as the Conservative Party, Iceland's Independence Party adopted its current name in 1929 after the merger with the Liberal Party. From the beginning, they have been the largest vote-winning party, averaging around 40%. They combined liberalism and conservatism, supported nationalization of infrastructure, and advocated class collaboration. While mostly in opposition during the 1930s, they embraced economic liberalism, but accepted the welfare state after the war and participated in governments supportive of state intervention and protectionism. Unlike other Scandanivian conservative (and liberal) parties, it has always had a large working-class following. After the financial crisis in 2008, the support level has dropped to 20–25%.

==== Ireland ====
Conservatism in Ireland historically revolved around social policies relating to the Catholic Church as well as a commitment to Irish republicanism, Irish neutrality, anti-abortion, anti-communism, pro-Europeanism, and, more recently, anti-immigration.

During the presidency of Éamon de Valera, a broad array of Catholic social policies were enacted, mostly with the goals of winning devout, rural, conservative voters, most of whom welcomed these policies. Such policies included writing into the Constitution of Ireland that a woman's place was in the home, prohibiting the importation or sale of contraceptives, and enactment of strict censorship laws.

Fianna Fáil and its historic rival, Fine Gael, are both considered historically to be conservative parties. However, there are some differences: mainly, Fianna Fáil is usually considered more republican, while Fine Gael tends to be more classically liberal.

Starting in 2022, a series of protests calling for a reduction in illegal immigration have become more commonplace in Ireland, mostly over the status of temporary asylum seeker shelters were unable to accommodate the more than 65,000 refugees.

==== Italy ====
After the unification of Italy, the country was governed successively by the Historical Right, which represented conservative, liberal-conservative, and conservative-liberal positions, and the Historical Left. After World War I, the country saw the emergence of its first mass parties, notably including the Italian People's Party (PPI), a Christian-democratic party that sought to represent the Catholic majority, which had long refrained from politics. The PPI and the Italian Socialist Party decisively contributed to the loss of strength and authority of the old liberal ruling class, which had not been able to structure itself into a proper party: the Liberal Union was not coherent and the Italian Liberal Party came too late.

In 1921, Benito Mussolini founded the National Fascist Party (PNF), and the next year, through the March on Rome, he was appointed Prime Minister by King Victor Emmanuel III. Fascism originated as a populist, revolutionary, anti-royalist, anti-clerical, anti-capitalist, and anti-conservative ideology, viewed by many socialists as a leftist heresy rather than a rightist opponent, but it transformed and became distinctly right-wing when it made compromises with the conservative establishment in order to consolidate authority and suppress communist movements. Mussolini commented on the dynamic pragmatism of fascism:

We do not believe in dogmatic programs. ... We permit ourselves the luxury of being aristocratic and democratic, conservative and progressive, reactionary and revolutionary, legalists and illegalists, according to the circumstances of the moment, the place and the environment.

In 1926, all parties were dissolved except the PNF, which remained the only legal party in the Kingdom of Italy until the fall of the regime in July 1943. By 1945, fascists were discredited, disbanded, and outlawed, while Mussolini was executed in April that year. The 1946 Italian institutional referendum concerned the fate of the monarchy. While southern Italy and parts of northern Italy were royalist, other parts, especially in central Italy, were predominantly republican. The outcome was 54–46% in favor of a republic, leading to a collapse of the monarchy.

After World War II, the center-right was dominated by the centrist party Christian Democracy (DC), which included both conservative and center-left elements. With its landslide victory over the Italian Socialist Party and the Italian Communist Party in 1948, the political center was in power. In Denis Mack Smith's words, it was "moderately conservative, reasonably tolerant of everything which did not touch religion or property, but above all Catholic and sometimes clerical". DC dominated politics until its dissolution in 1994, having governed for 47 out of 52 years.

In 1994, entrepreneur and media tycoon Silvio Berlusconi founded the liberal-conservative party Forza Italia (FI). He won three elections in 1994, 2001, and 2008, governing the country for almost ten years as prime minister. FI formed a coalitions with several parties, including the national-conservative National Alliance (AN), heir of the MSI, and the regionalist Lega Nord (LN). FI was briefly incorporated, along with AN, in The People of Freedom party and later revived in the new Forza Italia. After the 2018 general election, the LN and the Five Star Movement formed a populist government, which lasted about a year. In the 2022 general election, a center-right coalition came to power, this time dominated by Brothers of Italy (FdI), a new national-conservative party born on the ashes of AN. Consequently, FdI, the re-branded Lega, and FI formed a government under FdI leader Giorgia Meloni.

==== Luxembourg ====
Luxembourg's major conservative party, the Christian Social People's Party, was formed as the Party of the Right in 1914 and adopted its present name in 1945. It was consistently the largest political party in Luxembourg and dominated politics throughout the 20th century.

==== Netherlands ====
Liberalism has been strong in the Netherlands. Therefore, rightist parties are often liberal-conservative or conservative-liberal. One example is the People's Party for Freedom and Democracy. Even the right-wing populist and far-right Party for Freedom, which dominated the 2023 election, supports liberal positions such as gay rights, abortion, and euthanasia.

==== Norway ====
The Conservative Party of Norway (Norwegian: Høyre, literally "Right") was formed by the old upper-class of state officials and wealthy merchants to fight the populist democracy of the Liberal Party, but it lost power in 1884, when parliamentarian government was first practiced. It formed its first government under parliamentarism in 1889 and continued to alternate in power with the Liberals until the 1930s, when Labour became the dominant party. It has elements both of paternalism, stressing the responsibilities of the state, and of economic liberalism. It first returned to power in the 1960s. During Kåre Willoch's premiership in the 1980s, much emphasis was laid on liberalizing the credit and housing market and abolishing the NRK TV and radio monopoly, while supporting law and order in criminal justice and traditional norms in education.

==== Poland ====
The dominant conservative party in Poland is Law and Justice (PiS). Polish conservatism is characterized by social and cultural conservatism, patriotism, adherence to Catholic social teaching, and cooperation with the Catholic Church. Contemporary Polish conservatives believe in Atlanticism and strong relations with the United States, meanwhile taking a stand against Russia.

PiS has taken a populist and statist approach to economics, expanding state control over industries and media, greatly expanding social welfare and applying Keynesian-esque "anti-crisis shields", differentiating itself from previous conservative political parties and movements like AWS or Endecja which believed in economic liberalism. The party would "regulate the market strongly via the active role of the state", pursuing greater regulations against banks, large enterprises and the stock market; at the same time, it also attempted to implement deregulation for small businesses and enterprises. Another difference to AWS is PiS' euroscepticism. Though not opposing European Union membership, PiS pursues an assertive policy of conflict with the European Commission, which, in reaction, took a hostile stance against PiS. In the European Parliament, PiS belongs to the European Conservatives and Reformists group. Liberal media in Poland is vehemently biased against PiS and opposed to its rule, often calling it authoritarian. Liberal scholar Antoni Dudek rejects giving PiS the authoritarian label, suggesting that PiS rejects the ideals of liberal democracy and instead embraces a "national democratic" or illiberal democratic form of governance.

In the preceding interwar period, Poland's conservative movement was split between the "Old" Galician and Kresy conservatives, usually landowners, which formed minor parties like the State Unity in the Kresy, and the "New Conservative" movement of National Democracy (Endecja) under Roman Dmowski, which was oriented around the urban intelligentsia and petite bourgeoise. The latter sometimes cooperated with the right-wing factions of the Polish peasant movement, affiliated under the PSL "Piast" that cooperated with Endecja, creating a common government under the Lanckorona Pact, although the peasant movement was still not a part of the conservative movement. Endecja espoused Russophilia and believed in cooperation with the Russian Empire and later the White Army. They also advocated maintenance of democracy, civic nationalism, and parliamentarism, opposing Józef Piłsudski's BBWR's attempts at empowering the presidency and later its absolute seizure of power. In contrast, many Old Conservatives, such as Stanisław Cat-Mackiewicz, found themselves as allies of Marshal Piłsudski. Endecja rejected Romanticism and Messianism, concepts which were important to the Old Conservatives.

==== Russia ====
Russian conservatism has experienced a revival in recent decades. Under Vladimir Putin, the dominant leader since 1999, Russia has promoted explicitly conservative policies in social, cultural, and political matters, both at home and abroad. Putin has criticized globalism and economic liberalism, claiming that "liberalism has become obsolete" and that the vast majority of people in the world oppose multiculturalism, free immigration, and rights for LGBT people. Russian conservatism is special in some respects as it supports a mixed economy with economic intervention, combined with a strong nationalist sentiment and social conservatism which is largely populist. As a result, Russian conservatism opposes right-libertarian ideals such as the aforementioned concept of economic liberalism found in other conservative movements around the world.

Putin has also promoted new think tanks that bring together like-minded intellectuals and writers. For example, the Izborsky Club, founded in 2012 by Alexander Prokhanov, stresses Russian nationalism, the restoration of Russia's historical greatness, and systematic opposition to liberal ideas and policies. Vladislav Surkov, a senior government official, has been one of the key ideologues during Putin's presidency.

In cultural and social affairs, Putin has collaborated closely with the Russian Orthodox Church. Under Patriarch Kirill of Moscow, the Church has backed the expansion of Russian power into Crimea and eastern Ukraine. More broadly, The New York Times reports in September 2016 how the Church's policy prescriptions support the Kremlin's appeal to social conservatives:

A fervent foe of homosexuality and any attempt to put individual rights above those of family, community, or nation, the Russian Orthodox Church helps project Russia as the natural ally of all those who pine for a more secure, illiberal world free from the tradition-crushing rush of globalization, multiculturalism, and women's and gay rights.

==== Spain ====
Conservatism in Spain is represented by the center-right People's Party and ultra-right Vox party. The People's Party has its roots in the People's Alliance founded on 9 October 1976 by former Francoist minister Manuel Fraga. Although Fraga was a member of the reformist faction of the Franco regime, he supported an extremely gradual transition to democracy. However, he badly underestimated the public's distaste for Francoism. Additionally, while he attempted to convey a reformist image, the large number of former Francoists in the party led the public to perceive it as both reactionary and authoritarian. In the June 1977 general election, the AP garnered only 8.3 percent of the vote, putting it in fourth place.

The PP joined the European People's Party in 1991.

The PP became the largest party for the first time in 1996, and José María Aznar became Prime Minister with the support of the Basque Nationalist Party, the Catalan Convergence and Union and the Canarian Coalition. In the 2000 elections, the PP gained an absolute majority.

In August 2003, Mariano Rajoy was appointed Secretary General by Aznar. Thus, Rajoy became the party's candidate for Prime Minister in the 2004 general election, held three days after the 11 March 2004 Madrid train bombings, and which Rajoy lost by a big margin to Spanish Socialist Workers' Party (PSOE) leader José Luis Rodríguez Zapatero.

The PP under Mariano Rajoy opposed the PSOE government after the PP lost the general election in 2004, arguing that this victory was influenced by the Madrid bombings of 11 March 2004. At a national level, its political strategy has followed two main axes, both linked to Spain's delicate regional politics: first, opposing further administrative devolution to Catalonia by means of the newly approved "Estatut" or Statute of Catalonia that lays out the powers of the Catalan regional government. Second, it remains opposed to political negotiations with the Basque separatist organization ETA.

The prospect of increased demands for autonomy in the programs of Catalan and Basque parties, and Zapatero's alleged favoring of them, became a focus for the party's campaign for the March 2008 general election. Basque President Juan José Ibarretxe's proposal for a unilateral referendum for the solution of the Basque Conflict was another important issue.

The People's Party under Rajoy has an increasingly patriotic, or nationalist, element to it, appealing to the sense of "Spanishness" and making strong use of national symbols such as the Spanish flag. Prior to the national celebrations of Spanish Heritage Day, Rajoy made a speech asking Spaniards to "privately or publicly" display their pride in their nation and to honor their flag, an action which received some criticism from many political groups of the Congress.

Vox was founded in December 2013, splitting from the People's Party (PP). The party platform called for the rewriting of the Spanish constitution so as to curb regional autonomy and abolish regional parliaments. Several founding members of the party (for example, Alejo Vidal-Quadras, José Antonio Ortega Lara, and Santiago Abascal) had been members of the platform "reconversion.es", which had issued a manifesto in 2012 calling for a recentralization of the State. Vidal-Quadras was proclaimed as the first chairman in March 2014.

==== Sweden ====
In the early 19th century, Swedish conservatism developed alongside Swedish Romanticism. The historian Erik Gustaf Geijer, an exponent of Gothicism, glorified the Viking Age and the Swedish Empire, and the idealist philosopher Christopher Jacob Boström became the chief ideologue of the official state doctrine, which dominated Swedish politics for almost a century. Other influential Swedish conservative Romantics were Esaias Tegnér and Per Daniel Amadeus Atterbom.

Early parliamentary conservatism in Sweden was explicitly elitist. The Conservative Party was formed in 1904 with one major goal in mind: to stop the advent of universal suffrage, which they feared would result in socialism. Yet, it was a Swedish admiral, the conservative politician Arvid Lindman, who first extended democracy by enacting male suffrage, despite the protests of more traditionalist voices, such as the later prime minister, the arch-conservative and authoritarian statesman Ernst Trygger, who railed at progressive policies such as the abolition of the death penalty.

Once a democratic system was in place, Swedish conservatives sought to combine traditional elitism with modern populism. Sweden's most renowned political scientist, the conservative politician Rudolf Kjellén, coined the terms geopolitics and biopolitics in relation to his organic theory of the state. He also developed the corporatist-nationalist concept of Folkhemmet ('the people's home'), which became the single most powerful political concept in Sweden throughout the 20th century, although it was adopted by the Social Democratic Party who gave it a more socialist interpretation.

After a brief grand coalition between Left and Right during World War II, the center-right parties struggled to cooperate due to their ideological differences: the agrarian populism of the Centre Party, the urban liberalism of the Liberal People's Party, and the liberal-conservative elitism of the Moderate Party (the old Conservative Party). However, in 1976 and in 1979, the three parties managed to form a government under Thorbjörn Fälldin—and again in 1991 under aristocrat Carl Bildt and with support from the newly founded Christian Democrats, the most conservative party in contemporary Sweden.

In modern times, mass immigration from distant cultures caused a large populist dissatisfaction, which was not channeled through any of the established parties, who generally espoused multiculturalism. Instead, the 2010s saw the rise of the right-wing populist Sweden Democrats, who were surging as the largest party in the polls on several occasions. Due to its fascist roots, the party was ostracized by the other parties until 2019 when Christian Democrat leader Ebba Busch reached out for collaboration, after which the Moderate Party followed suit. In 2022, the center-right parties formed a government with support from the Sweden Democrats as the largest party. The subsequent Tidö Agreement, negotiated in Tidö Castle, incorporated authoritarian policies such as a stricter stance on immigration and a harsher stance on law and order.

==== Switzerland ====
In some aspects, Swiss conservatism is unique, as Switzerland is an old federal republic born from historically sovereign cantons, comprising three major nationalities and adhering to the principle of Swiss neutrality.

There are a number of conservative parties in Switzerland's parliament, the Federal Assembly. These include the largest ones: the Swiss People's Party (SVP), the Christian Democratic People's Party (CVP), and the Conservative Democratic Party of Switzerland (BDP), which is a splinter of the SVP created in the aftermath to the election of Eveline Widmer-Schlumpf as Federal Council.

The SVP was formed from the 1971 merger of the Party of Farmers, Traders and Citizens, formed in 1917, and the smaller Democratic Party, formed in 1942. The SVP emphasized agricultural policy and was strong among farmers in German-speaking Protestant areas. As Switzerland considered closer relations with the European Union in the 1990s, the SVP adopted a more militant protectionist and isolationist stance. This stance has allowed it to expand into German-speaking Catholic mountainous areas. The Anti-Defamation League, a non-Swiss lobby group based in the United States has accused them of manipulating issues such as immigration, Swiss neutrality, and welfare benefits, awakening antisemitism and racism. The Council of Europe has called the SVP "extreme right", although some scholars dispute this classification. For instance, Hans-Georg Betz describes it as "populist radical right". The SVP has been the largest party since 2003.

==== Ukraine ====
The authoritarian Ukrainian State was headed by Cossack aristocrat Pavlo Skoropadskyi and represented the conservative movement. The 1918 Hetman government, which appealed to the tradition of the 17th–18th century Cossack Hetman state, represented the conservative strand in Ukraine's struggle for independence. It had the support of the proprietary classes and of conservative and moderate political groups. Vyacheslav Lypynsky was a main ideologue of Ukrainian conservatism.

==== United Kingdom ====
Modern English conservatives celebrate Anglo-Irish statesman Edmund Burke as their intellectual father. Burke was affiliated with the Whig Party, which eventually split among the Liberal Party and the Conservative Party, but the modern Conservative Party is generally thought to derive primarily from the Tories, and the MPs of the modern conservative party are still frequently referred to as Tories.

Shortly after Burke's death in 1797, conservatism was revived as a mainstream political force as the Whigs suffered a series of internal divisions. This new generation of conservatives derived their politics not from Burke, but from his predecessor, the Viscount Bolingbroke, who was a Jacobite and traditional Tory, lacking Burke's sympathies for Whiggish policies such as Catholic emancipation and American independence (famously attacked by Samuel Johnson in "Taxation No Tyranny").

In the first half of the 19th century, many newspapers, magazines, and journals promoted loyalist or right-wing attitudes in religion, politics, and international affairs. Burke was seldom mentioned, but William Pitt the Younger became a conspicuous hero. The most prominent journals included the Quarterly Review, founded in 1809 as a counterweight to the Whigs' Edinburgh Review, and the even more conservative Blackwood's Magazine. The Quarterly Review promoted a balanced Canningite Toryism, as it was neutral on Catholic emancipation and only mildly critical of Nonconformist dissent; it opposed slavery and supported the current poor laws; and it was "aggressively imperialist". The high-church clergy of the Church of England read the Orthodox Churchman's Magazine, which was equally hostile to Jewish, Catholic, Jacobin, Methodist and Unitarian spokesmen. Anchoring the ultra-Tories, Blackwood's Edinburgh Magazine stood firmly against Catholic emancipation and favored slavery, cheap money, mercantilism, the Navigation Acts, and the Holy Alliance.

Conservatism evolved after 1820, embracing free trade in 1846 and a commitment to democracy, especially under Benjamin Disraeli. The effect was to significantly strengthen conservatism as a grassroots political force. Conservatism no longer was the philosophical defense of the landed aristocracy, but had been refreshed into redefining its commitment to the ideals of order, both secular and religious, expanding imperialism, strengthened monarchy, and a more generous vision of the welfare state as opposed to the punitive vision of the Whigs and liberals. As early as 1835, Disraeli attacked the Whigs and utilitarians as slavishly devoted to an industrial oligarchy, while he described his fellow Tories as the only "really democratic party of England", devoted to the interests of the whole people. Nevertheless, inside the party there was a tension between the growing numbers of wealthy businessmen on the one side and the aristocracy and rural gentry on the other. The aristocracy gained strength as businessmen discovered they could use their wealth to buy a peerage and a country estate.

Some conservatives lamented the passing of a pastoral world where the ethos of noblesse oblige had promoted respect from the lower classes. They saw the Anglican Church and the aristocracy as balances against commercial wealth. They worked toward legislation for improved working conditions and urban housing. This viewpoint would later be called Tory democracy. However, since Burke, there has always been tension between traditional aristocratic conservatism and the wealthy liberal business class.

In 1834, Tory Prime Minister Robert Peel issued the "Tamworth Manifesto", in which he pledged to endorse moderate political reform. This marked the beginning of the transformation from High Tory reactionism towards a more modern form of conservatism. As a result, the party became known as the Conservative Party—a name it has retained to this day. However, Peel would also be the root of a split in the party between the traditional Tories (by the Earl of Derby and Benjamin Disraeli) and the "Peelites" (led first by Peel himself, then by the Earl of Aberdeen). The split occurred in 1846 over the issue of free trade, which Peel supported, versus protectionism, supported by Derby. The majority of the party sided with Derby while about a third split away, eventually merging with the Whigs and the radicals to form the Liberal Party. Despite the split, the mainstream Conservative Party accepted the doctrine of free trade in 1852.

In the second half of the 19th century, the Liberal Party faced political schisms, especially over Irish Home Rule. Leader William Gladstone (himself a former Peelite) sought to give Ireland a degree of autonomy, a move that elements in both the left and right-wings of his party opposed. These split off to become the Liberal Unionists (led by Joseph Chamberlain), forming a coalition with the Conservatives before merging with them in 1912. The Liberal Unionist influence dragged the Conservative Party towards the left as Conservative governments passed a number of progressive reforms at the turn of the 20th century. By the late 19th century, the traditional business supporters of the Liberal Party had joined the Conservatives, making them the party of business and commerce as well.

After a period of Liberal dominance before World War I, the Conservatives gradually became more influential in government, regaining full control of the cabinet in 1922. In the inter-war period, conservatism was the major ideology in Britain as the Liberal Party vied with the Labour Party for control of the left. After World War II, the first Labour government (1945–1951) under Clement Attlee embarked on a program of nationalization of industry and the promotion of social welfare. The Conservatives generally accepted those policies until the 1980s.

In the 1980s, the Conservative government of Margaret Thatcher, guided by neoliberal economics, reversed many of Labour's social programmes, privatized large parts of the UK economy, and sold state-owned assets. The Conservative Party also adopted soft eurosceptic politics and opposed Federal Europe. Other conservative political parties, such as the Democratic Unionist Party (DUP, founded in 1971), and the United Kingdom Independence Party (UKIP, founded in 1993), began to appear, although they have yet to make any significant impact at Westminster. As of 2014, the DUP is the largest political party in the ruling coalition in the Northern Ireland Assembly, and from 2017 to 2019 the DUP provided support for the Conservative minority government under a confidence-and-supply arrangement.

=== Latin America ===
Conservative elites have long dominated Latin American nations. Mostly, this has been achieved through control of civil institutions, the Catholic Church, and the military, rather than through party politics. Typically, the Church was exempt from taxes and its employees immune from civil prosecution. Where conservative parties were weak or non-existent, conservatives were more likely to rely on military dictatorship as a preferred form of government.

However, in some nations where the elites were able to mobilize popular support for conservative parties, longer periods of political stability were achieved. Chile, Colombia, and Venezuela are examples of nations that developed strong conservative parties. Argentina, Brazil, El Salvador, and Peru are examples of nations where this did not occur.

Political scientist Louis Hartz explained conservatism in Latin American nations as a result of their settlement as feudal societies.

==== Brazil ====
Conservatism in Brazil originates from the cultural and historical tradition of Brazil, whose cultural roots are Luso-Iberian and Roman Catholic. More traditional conservative historical views and features include belief in political federalism and monarchism. Brazil is the only Latin American nation with a relatively strong royalist sentiment, and throughout modern history a significant minority of the population has always supported a monarchical restoration.

The military dictatorship in Brazil was established on April 1, 1964, after a coup d'état by the Brazilian Army with support from the United States government, and it lasted for 21 years, until March 15, 1985. The coup received support from almost all high-ranking members of the military along with conservative sectors in society, such as the Catholic Church and anti-communist civilian movements among the Brazilian middle and upper classes. The dictatorship reached the height of its popularity in the 1970s with the so-called Brazilian Miracle. Brazil's military government provided a model for other military regimes throughout Latin America, being systematized by the "National Security Doctrine", which was used to justify the military's actions as operating in the interest of national security in a time of crisis.

In contemporary politics, a conservative wave began roughly around the 2014 Brazilian presidential election. According to commentators, the National Congress of Brazil elected in 2014 may be considered the most conservative since the re-democratization movement, citing an increase in the number of parliamentarians linked to more conservative segments, such as ruralists, the military, the police, and religious conservatives. The subsequent economic crisis of 2015 and investigations of corruption scandals led to a right-wing movement that sought to rescue ideas from capitalism in opposition to socialism. At the same time, fiscal conservatives such as those that make up the Free Brazil Movement emerged among many others. Military officer Jair Bolsonaro of the Social Liberal Party was the winner of the 2018 Brazilian presidential election.

==== Chile ====
The Chilean Civil War of 1829-1830 was a civil war in Chile between conservative Pelucones and liberal Pipiolos forces over the constitutional system. Pelucones won the civil war, leading to the Conservative Republic from 1829 to 1861.

Chile's conservative party, the National Party, disbanded in 1973 following a military coup and did not re-emerge as a political force after the return to democracy. During the military dictatorship of Chile, the country was ruled by a military junta headed by General Augusto Pinochet. His ideology, known as Pinochetism, was anti-communist, militaristic, nationalistic, and laissez-faire capitalistic. Under Pinochet, Chile's economy was placed under the control of a group of economists known collectively as the Chicago Boys, whose liberalizing policies have been described as neoliberal.

==== Colombia ====
The Colombian Conservative Party, founded in 1849, traces its origins to opponents of General Francisco de Paula Santander's 1833–1837 administration. While the term "liberal" had been used to describe all political forces in Colombia, the conservatives began describing themselves as "conservative liberals" and their opponents as "red liberals". From the 1860s until the present, the party has supported strong central government and the Catholic Church, especially its role as protector of the sanctity of the family, and opposed separation of church and state. Its policies include the legal equality of all men, the citizen's right to own property, and opposition to dictatorship. It has usually been Colombia's second largest party, with the Colombian Liberal Party being the largest.

=== North America ===
North American conservatism, combining traditionalist conservatism, economic liberalism, and right-wing populism, is different from European conservatism and can be traced back to the classical liberalism of the 18th and 19th centuries, although Canada developed an American-style conservatism that competed with the older Tory conservatism. According to political scientist Louis Hartz, French Canada is a fragment of feudal Europe, whereas the United States and English Canada are liberal fragments. Sociologist Reginald Bibby asserts that conservatism has been strong and enduring throughout North America because of the propagation of religious values from generation to generation.

==== Canada ====
Canada's conservatives had their roots in the Tory loyalists who left America after the American Revolution. They developed in the socio-economic and political cleavages that existed during the first three decades of the 19th century and had the support of the mercantile, professional, and religious elites in Ontario and to a lesser extent in Quebec. Holding a monopoly over administrative and judicial offices, they were called the Family Compact in Ontario and the Chateau Clique in Quebec. John A. Macdonald's successful leadership of the movement to confederate the provinces, and his subsequent tenure as prime minister for most of the late 19th century, rested on his ability to bring together the English-speaking Protestant aristocracy and the ultramontane Catholic hierarchy of Quebec and to keep them united in a conservative coalition.

The conservatives combined Toryism and pro-market liberalism. They generally supported an activist government and state intervention in the marketplace, and their policies were marked by noblesse oblige—a paternalistic responsibility of the elites for the less well-off. The party was known as the Progressive Conservatives from 1942 until 2003, when the party merged with the Canadian Alliance to form the Conservative Party of Canada.

The conservative and autonomist Union Nationale, led by Maurice Duplessis, governed the province of Quebec in periods from 1936 to 1960 and in a close alliance with the Catholic Church, small rural elites, farmers, and business elites. This period, known by liberals as the Great Darkness, ended with the Quiet Revolution and the party went into terminal decline.

By the end of the 1960s, the political debate in Quebec centered around the question of independence, opposing the social democratic and sovereignist Parti Québécois and the centrist and federalist Quebec Liberal Party, therefore marginalizing the conservative movement. Most French Canadian conservatives rallied either the Quebec Liberal Party or the Parti Québécois, while some of them still tried to offer an autonomist third-way with what was left of the Union Nationale or the more populists Ralliement créditiste du Québec and Parti national populaire, but by the 1981 provincial election politically organized conservatism had been obliterated in Quebec. It slowly started to revive at the 1994 provincial election with the Action démocratique du Québec, who served as Official opposition in the National Assembly from 2007 to 2008, before merging in 2012 with François Legault's Coalition Avenir Québec, which took power in 2018. The modern Conservative Party of Canada has rebranded conservatism and, under the leadership of Stephen Harper, added more conservative policies.

Yoram Hazony, a scholar on the history and ideology of conservatism, identified Canadian psychologist Jordan Peterson as the most significant conservative thinker to appear in the English-speaking world in a generation.

==== United States ====
The meaning of conservatism in the United States is different from the way the word is used elsewhere. Following the American Revolution, Americans rejected the core ideals of European conservatism, which were based on landed nobility, hereditary monarchy, established churches, and powerful armies. However, the prominent American conservative historian Russell Kirk argued, in his influential work The Conservative Mind (1953), that conservatism had been brought to the United States and he interpreted the American Revolution as a "conservative revolution" against royal innovation. The revolution was also supported by Anglo-Irish statesman Edmund Burke, widely known as the father of conservatism, although Burke and a few Founding Fathers, most notably John Adams, were highly critical of the French Revolution.

American conservatism is a broad system of political beliefs in the United States, which is characterized by respect for American traditions, support for Judeo-Christian values, economic liberalism, anti-communism, and a defense of Western culture. Liberty within the bounds of conformity to conservatism is a core value, with a particular emphasis on strengthening the free market, limiting the size and scope of government, and opposing high taxes as well as government or labor union encroachment on the entrepreneur.

The 1830s Democratic Party became divided between Southern Democrats, who supported slavery, secession, and later segregation, and the Northern Democrats, who tended to support the abolition of slavery, union, and equality. Many Democrats were conservative in the sense that they wanted things to be like they were in the past, especially as far as race was concerned. They generally favored poorer farmers and urban workers, and were hostile to banks, industrialization, and high tariffs.

The post-Civil War Republican Party had conservative factions, but was not uniformly conservative. The Southern Democrats united with pro-segregation Northern Republicans to form the Conservative Coalition, which successfully put an end to Blacks being elected to national political office until 1967, when Edward Brooke was elected Senator from Massachusetts. Conservative Democrats influenced US politics until 1994's Republican Revolution, as the American South shifted from solid Democrat to solid Republican, while maintaining its conservative values.

In late 19th century, the Democratic Party split into two factions; the more conservative Eastern business faction (led by Grover Cleveland) favored gold, while the South and West (led by William Jennings Bryan) wanted more silver in order to raise prices for their crops. In 1892, Cleveland won the election on a conservative platform, which supported maintaining the gold standard, reducing tariffs, and taking a laissez-faire approach to government intervention. A severe nationwide depression ruined his plans. Many of his supporters in 1896 supported the Gold Democrats when liberal William Jennings Bryan won the nomination and campaigned for bimetallism, money backed by both gold and silver. The conservative wing nominated Alton B. Parker in 1904, but he got very few votes.

The major conservative party in the United States today is the Republican Party, also known as the GOP (Grand Old Party). Modern American conservatives often consider individual liberty as the fundamental trait of democracy, as long as it conforms to conservative values, small government, deregulation of the government, and economic liberalism—which contrasts with modern American liberals, who generally place a greater value on social equality and social justice. Other major priorities within American conservatism include support for the nuclear family, law and order, the right to bear arms, Christian values, anti-communism, and a defense of "Western civilization from the challenges of modernist culture and totalitarian governments". Economic conservatives and libertarians favor small government, low taxes, limited regulation, and free enterprise. Some social conservatives see traditional social values threatened by secularism; so, they support school prayer, and oppose abortion. Neoconservatives want to expand American ideals throughout the world, and show a strong support for Israel. Paleoconservatives oppose multiculturalism and press for restrictions on immigration.

The conservative movement of the 1950s attempted to bring together the divergent conservative strands, stressing the need for unity to prevent the spread of "godless communism", which Reagan later labeled an "evil empire". During the Reagan administration, conservatives also supported the so-called Reagan Doctrine, under which the US as part of a Cold War strategy provided military and other support to guerrilla insurgencies that were fighting governments identified as socialist or communist. The Reagan administration also adopted neoliberalism and Reaganomics (pejoratively referred to as trickle-down economics), resulting in the 1980s economic growth and trillion-dollar deficits. Other modern conservative positions include anti-environmentalism. On average, American conservatives desire tougher foreign policies than liberals do.

The Tea Party movement, founded in 2009, proved a large outlet for populist American conservative ideas. Their stated goals included rigorous adherence to the US constitution, lower taxes, and opposition to a growing role for the federal government in health care. Electorally, it was considered a key force in Republicans reclaiming control of the US House of Representatives in 2010.

Long-term shifts in conservative thinking following the election of Donald Trump have been described as a "new fusionism" of traditional conservative ideology and right-wing populist themes. These have resulted in shifts towards greater support for national conservatism, protectionism, cultural conservatism, a more realist foreign policy, a repudiation of neoconservatism, reduced efforts to roll back entitlement programs, and a disdain for traditional checks and balances.

=== Oceania ===
==== Australia ====
The Liberal Party of Australia adheres to the principles of social conservatism and liberal conservatism. It is liberal in the sense of economics. Commentators explain: "In America, 'liberal' means left-of-center, and it is a pejorative term when used by conservatives in adversarial political debate. In Australia, of course, the conservatives are in the Liberal Party." The National Right is the most organized and reactionary of the three factions within the party.

Political scientist James Jupp writes that "[the] decline in English influences on Australian reformism and radicalism, and appropriation of the symbols of Empire by conservatives continued under the Liberal Party leadership of Sir Robert Menzies, which lasted until 1966".

Other conservative parties are the National Party of Australia (a sister party of the Liberals), Family First Party, Democratic Labor Party, Shooters, Fishers and Farmers Party, Australian Conservatives, and the Katter's Australian Party.

The largest party in the country is the Australian Labor Party, and its dominant faction is Labor Right, a socially conservative element. Australia undertook significant economic reform under the Labor Party in the mid-1980s. Consequently, issues like protectionism, welfare reform, privatization, and deregulation are no longer debated in the political space as they are in Europe or North America.

==== New Zealand ====
Conservatism in New Zealand has its roots in the unorganized conservative opposition to the New Zealand Liberal Party in the late 19th century. In 1909 this ideological strand found a more organized expression in the Reform Party, a forerunner to the contemporary New Zealand National Party, which absorbed historic conservative elements. The National Party, established in 1936, embodies a spectrum of tendencies, including conservative and liberal. Throughout its history, the party has oscillated between periods of conservative emphasis and liberal reform. Its stated values include "individual freedom and choice" and "limited government".

In the 1980s and 1990s both the National Party and its main opposing party, the traditionally left-wing Labour Party, implemented free-market reforms.

The New Zealand First party, which split from the National Party in 1993, espouses nationalist and conservative principles.

== Psychology ==
=== Conscientiousness ===
The Big Five personality model has applications in the study of political psychology. It has been found by several studies that individuals who score high in Conscientiousness (the quality of working hard and being careful) are more likely to possess a right-wing political identification. Since conscientiousness is positively related to job performance, a 2021 study found that conservative service workers earn higher ratings, evaluations, and tips than social liberal ones.

=== Disgust sensitivity ===
A number of studies have found that disgust is tightly linked to political orientation. People who are highly sensitive to disgusting images are more likely to align with the political right and value traditional ideals of bodily and spiritual purity, tending to oppose, for example, abortion and gay marriage.

Research in the field of evolutionary psychology has also found that people who are more disgust sensitive tend to favor their own in-group over out-groups. A proposed reason for this phenomenon is that people begin to associate outsiders with disease while associating health with people similar to themselves.

The higher one's disgust sensitivity is, the greater the tendency to make more conservative moral judgments. Disgust sensitivity is associated with moral hypervigilance, which means that people who have higher disgust sensitivity are more likely to think that suspects of a crime are guilty. They also tend to view them as evil, if found guilty, and endorse harsher punishment in the setting of a court.

=== Authoritarianism ===
Right-wing authoritarianism (RWA) is a set of attitudes that describe somebody who is highly submissive to their authority figures, acts aggressively in the name of said authorities, and is conformist in thought and behavior. According to psychologist Bob Altemeyer, individuals who are politically conservative tend to score high on RWA.

A study done on Israeli and Palestinian students in Israel found that RWA scores of right-wing party supporters were significantly higher than those of left-wing party supporters. However, a 2005 study by psychologist H. Michael Crowson and colleagues suggested a moderate gap between RWA and other conservative positions, stating that their "results indicated that conservatism is not synonymous with RWA".

According to political scientist Karen Stenner, who specializes in authoritarianism, conservatives will embrace diversity and civil liberties to the extent that they are institutionalized traditions in the social order, but they tend to be drawn to authoritarianism when public opinion is fractious and there is a loss of confidence in public institutions.

=== Ambiguity intolerance ===
In 1973, psychologist Glenn Wilson published an influential book providing evidence that a general factor underlying conservative beliefs is "fear of uncertainty". A meta-analysis of research literature found that many factors, such as intolerance of ambiguity and need for cognitive closure, contribute to the degree of one's political conservatism and its manifestations in decision-making. A study by Kathleen Maclay stated that these traits "might be associated with such generally valued characteristics as personal commitment and unwavering loyalty". The research also suggested that while most people are resistant to change, social liberals are more tolerant of it.

=== Social dominance orientation ===
Social dominance orientation (SDO) is a personality trait measuring an individual's support for social hierarchy and the extent to which they desire their in-group be superior to out-groups. Psychologist Felicia Pratto and her colleagues have found evidence to support the claim that a high SDO is strongly correlated with conservative views and opposition to social engineering to promote equality. Pratto and her colleagues also found that high SDO scores were highly correlated with measures of prejudice.

However, psychologist David J. Schneider argued for a more complex relationships between the three factors, writing that "correlations between prejudice and political conservatism are reduced virtually to zero when controls for SDO are instituted, suggesting that the conservatism–prejudice link is caused by SDO". British conservative political theorist Kenneth Minogue criticized Pratto's work, saying:

It is characteristic of the conservative temperament to value established identities, to praise habit and to respect prejudice, not because it is irrational, but because such things anchor the darting impulses of human beings in solidities of custom which we do not often begin to value until we are already losing them. Radicalism often generates youth movements, while conservatism is a condition found among the mature, who have discovered what it is in life they most value.

A 1996 study by Pratto and her colleagues examined the topic of racism. Contrary to what these theorists predicted, correlations between conservatism and racism were strongest among the most educated individuals, and weakest among the least educated. They also found that the correlation between racism and conservatism could be accounted for by their mutual relationship with SDO.

=== Happiness ===
In his book Gross National Happiness (2008), Arthur C. Brooks presents the finding that conservatives are roughly twice as happy as social liberals. A 2008 study suggested that conservatives tend to be happier than social liberals because of their tendency to justify the current state of affairs and to remain unbothered by inequalities in society. A 2012 study disputed this hypothesis, demonstrating that conservatives expressed greater personal agency (e.g., personal control, responsibility), more positive outlook (e.g., optimism, self-worth), and more transcendent moral beliefs (e.g., greater religiosity, greater moral clarity).

== See also ==
=== National variants ===
- Conservatism in Australia
- Conservatism in Bangladesh
- Conservatism in Brazil
- Conservatism in Canada
- Conservatism in China
- Conservatism in Colombia
- Conservatism in Germany
- Conservatism in Hong Kong
- Conservatism in India
- Conservatism in Iran
- Conservatism in Israel
- Conservatism in Japan
- Conservatism in Malaysia
- Conservatism in New Zealand
- Conservatism in Pakistan
- Conservatism in Peru
- Conservatism in Russia
- Conservatism in Serbia
- Conservatism in South Korea
- Conservatism in Taiwan
- Conservatism in Turkey
- Conservatism in the United Kingdom
- Conservatism in the United States

=== Ideological variants ===
- Authoritarian conservatism
- Black conservatism
- Corporatist conservatism
- Cultural conservatism
- Feminist conservatism
- Fiscal conservatism
- Green conservatism
- LGBTQ conservatism
- Liberal conservatism
- Libertarian conservatism
- Moderate conservatism
- National conservatism
- Neoconservatism
- Paternalistic conservatism
- Pragmatic conservatism
- Progressive conservatism
- Populist conservatism
- Social conservatism
- Traditionalist conservatism
- Ultraconservatism

=== Related topics ===
- Christian democracy
- Christian right
- Communitarianism
- Counter-revolutionary
- Familialism
- Historism
- Islamism
- Reactionary
- Right realism
- Small-c conservative
- Toryism

== Bibliography ==
- Adams, Ian (2001). Political Ideology Today. Manchester University Press. ISBN 978-0-7190-6020-5.
- Annesley, Claire (2005). A Political and Economic Dictionary of Western Europe. Routledge. ISBN 978-1-85743-214-5.
- Auerbach, M. Morton (1959). The Conservative Illusion. Columbia University Press. ISBN 978-0-598-37476-9.
- Bischof, Günter J., ed. (2003). The Dollfuss/Schuschnigg Era in Austria: A Reassessment. Transaction Publishers. ISBN 9781412821896.
- Blinkhorn, Martin (1990). Fascists and Conservatives: The Radical Right and the Establishment in Twentieth-Century Europe. Psychology Press. ISBN 978-0-04-940087-0.
- Eccleshall, Robert (1990). English Conservatism since the Restoration: An Introduction and Anthology. Unwin Hyman. ISBN 978-0-04-445346-8.
- "Conservatism". Encyclopædia Britannica.
- Fawcett, Edmund (2020). Conservatism: The Fight for a Tradition. Princeton University Press. ISBN 978-0-691-17410-5.
- Freeden, Michael; Sargent, Lyman Tower; Stears, Marc; et al. (2013). Oxford Handbook of Political Ideologies. OUP Oxford. ISBN 978-0199585977.
- Frohnen, Bruce; et al. (2006). American Conservatism: An Encyclopedia. ISI Books. ISBN 978-1-932236-43-9.
- Giubilei, Francesco (2019). The History of European Conservative Thought. Simon and Schuster. ISBN 9781621579090.
- Heywood, Andrew (2004). Political Theory: An Introduction (3 ed.). Palgrave Macmillan. ISBN 9780333961803.
- Heywood, Andrew (2017). Political Ideologies: An Introduction. Palgrave Macmillan. ISBN 978-1-137-60604-4.
- Huntington, Samuel P. "Conservatism as an Ideology." American Political Science Review 51, no. 2 (1957): 454-473. doi:10.2307/1952202
- Kojève, Alexandre (2020) [1942]. The Notion of Authority: A Brief Presentation. Verso Books. ISBN 9781788739610.
- von Kuehnelt-Leddihn, Erik (1943). The Menace of the Herd; or, Procrustes at Large. Ludwig von Mises Institute. OCLC 733805752.
- McLean, Iain; McMillan, Alistair (2009). Concise Oxford Dictionary of Politics. Oxford University Press. ISBN 9780199207800.
- Muller, Jerry Z. (1997). Conservatism: An Anthology of Social and Political Thought from David Hume to the Present. Princeton University Press. ISBN 9780691037110.
- Neill, Edmund (2021). Conservatism. Polity. ISBN 978-1-5095-2705-2.
- Nisbet, Robert (2002). Conservatism: Dream and Reality. Transaction Publishers. ISBN 9780765808622.
- Remmer, Karen L. (1989). Military Rule in Latin America. Westview. p. 10. ISBN 978-0-8133-8450-4.
- Schneider, Gregory (2009). The Conservative Century: From Reaction to Revolution. Rowman & Littlefield. ISBN 9780742542846.
- Siaroff, Alan (2000). Comparative European Party Systems. Garland. ISBN 0-8153-2930-X.
- Ware, Alan (1996). Political Parties and Party Systems. Oxford University Press. ISBN 978-0-19-878076-2.
