= Conservative socialism =

Conservative socialism may refer to:

- Bourgeois socialism, a term used by Karl Marx to critique certain strains of socialism
- Left-conservatism, an ideology promoting economically socialist and culturally conservative stances
