= Conservative corporatism =

Aspect of conservative culture

Based upon the normative value of conservatism and the structural layout of corporatism, conservative corporatism arose as a response to liberalism and Marxism by rejecting the cultural pluralism of liberalism, the political radicalism and dialectical materialism of Marxism, and the mutually held secularist attitudes of both. Economic systems of conservative corporatism are identified as involving a status-related welfare state, pronounced but not extreme income differentials, moderate social hierarchies, moderate social rights, and some social exclusion. Conservative corporatism is also a corporatist political culture that is distinct from fascist corporatism in that rather than having a dictatorship impose order through force, the conservative corporatist culture is already settled and ongoing. The conservative corporatist culture relies on existing shared values of its members and therefore does not feature a large police force. The theoretical source of legitimacy of a conservative corporatist culture is tradition and hierarchy of birth. While its members are rational beings, the culture itself does not attempt to justify itself by reason as for instance a fascist corporatist culture does, but rather appeals to the way it has always been done. They feel that tradition is the rightful basis of society.

The conservative corporatist culture is organized with rigid hierarchy defined by birth and age. They view this hierarchy as fundamental to the proper functioning of the society. They do not value or seek to achieve egalitarianism because they believe it is an illusion and detrimental. Any power attained by those who seek equality is considered an illegitimate replacement. Merit does play a limited role in who has influence, but hierarchy of birth takes precedence over merit whenever there is a conflict between the two. The conservative corporate culture is based on the family. Small corporate groups as well as the whole society are seen as a big family. For this reason, conservative corporatists tend to view time and goals in terms longer than one's own lifetime. Specialization of skills by small corporate groups tend to perpetuate the culture because it causes members to feel a sense of self-government and self-sufficiency. The connection of their work to the purpose of the whole society is close and obvious. Conservative corporate cultures are conceived in cooperation, not competition. Members accept the hierarchy and ownership is not vested in individuals but rather social groups. The good of these groups is believed to be the same as the good of the whole society.

== See also ==
- Bourgeois socialism
- Tory socialism
