= Noël O'Sullivan =

Noël O'Sullivan is currently Research Professor of Political Philosophy at the University of Hull.

He studied at the London School of Economics and Harvard University. In 1967 he joined the Politics Department at Hull University. In 1992 he was given a personal chair in political philosophy at Hull.

In his book on conservatism O'Sullivan argued that "No single unifying idea is to be found in the English conservative tradition, except perhaps a certain scepticism and a pragmatic emphasis". The book also contains chapters on French and German conservatism.

O'Sullivan argued that fascism was one example of the new revolutionary style of modern politics, of which communism was also a manifestation. He also argued that fascism was an extreme example of the "activist" style of politics, which he defined as one that substitutes ideology for law, subordinates individuals to an all-embracing political order, has no intrinsic respect for constitutional forms, and rejects the existence of historic frontiers as a relevant determinant of its scope. This style of politics owed much, O'Sullivan claimed, to millenarianism and civic humanism.

John Gray has called O'Sullivan a "genuine expert on conservative thought and a profound scholar".

== Works ==
- Conservatism (London: Littlehampton, 1976).
- Fascism (London: Dent, 1983).
- Santayana (London: Claridge, 1992).
- European Political Thought since 1945 (Basingstoke: Palgrave Macmillan, 2004).
- The Place of Michael Oakeshott in Contemporary Western and Non-Western Thought (Exeter: Imprint Academic, 2017).
