= State Socialism (Germany) =

Set of welfare programmes implemented in the German Empire

State Socialism (German: Staatssozialismus) was a set of social programs implemented in the German Empire that were initiated by Otto von Bismarck in 1883 as remedial measures to appease the working class and reduce support for socialism and the Social Democratic Party of Germany, following earlier attempts to achieve the same objective through Bismarck's Anti-Socialist Laws. As a term, it was coined by Bismarck's liberal opposition to these social welfare policies, but it was later accepted by Bismarck. This did not prevent the Social Democrats from becoming the biggest party in the Reichstag by 1912. According to historian Jonathan Steinberg, "[a]ll told, Bismarck's system was a massive success—except in one respect. His goal to keep the Social Democratic Party out of power utterly failed. The vote for the Social Democratic Party went up and by 1912 they were the biggest party in the Reichstag".

State Socialism was a conservative ideology which supported the aristocracy, the church and the monarchy while maintaining harmony with capitalists and workers, in opposition to both liberalism and socialism. It was supported by the German Conservative Party, and opposed by the National Liberal Party, Free Conservative Party and the Socialist Workers' Party. Historian Alexander Nove argued that social ownership through government can only occur if the government is socially controlled which was not the case where an emperor rules by the will of God as in Germany since the Emperor was not the public. Nove's definition of social ownership, a common characteristic that accomunates types of socialism, refers to "the major part of means of production", but this remained in private hands under State Socialism. In "Why I Am Not a Conservative", Friedrich Hayek explained that "[t]here are, however, two economic and philosophical estimates of society with which State Socialism may be brought into broad contrast", namely liberalism and socialism. According to journalist William Harbutt Dawson, an acknowledged expert on German politics and society, "[t]he great disagreement between Socialism and State Socialism is that the former would entirely subvert the State, while the latter accepts its political form as it is. Socialism would abolish the existing order altogether, while State Socialism would use the State for the accomplishment of great economic and social purposes, especially restoring to it the function, which Frederick the Great held to be the principal business of the State, of 'holding the balance [...] between classes and parties".

Bismarck's biographer A. J. P. Taylor wrote that "[i]t would be unfair to say that Bismarck took up social welfare solely to weaken the Social Democrats; he had had it in mind for a long time, and believed in it deeply. But as usual he acted on his beliefs at the exact moment when they served a practical need". When a reference was made to his friendship with Ferdinand Lassalle, a democratic and state-oriented reformist socialist, Bismarck stated that he was a more practical socialist than the Social Democrats. Bismarck justified his social welfare programs by stating that "[w]hoever has pensions for his old age is far more easy to handle than one who has no such prospect. Look at the difference between a private servant in the chancellery or at court; the latter will put up with much more, because he has a pension to look forward to".

== Background ==
During the industrial revolution in Germany more and more people became workers in the factories. They moved to the big industrial centers providing workforce in industrialisations key branches such as fuel generating coal mines, the textile industry as well as steel and railway factories. The changes can be characterised by a transition from small-scale production in manufactures to a lots of goods providing large-scale industry.

Many workers were previously subsistence farmers. Working in factories made them dependent on their salaries and goods they could get in shops instead of producing them on their own. Fast growing cities such as Berlin, Vienna, London, Paris, could not provide healthy housing for the workers, as described by Friedrich Engels in "the housing question". Families living in a single room and cellar apartments causing health issues due to a lack of rest can be seen as a cause of growing poverty. To describe worsening conditions the German term of "schlafgänger" became common, describing workers renting a shared bed for a few hours of the day. Poor housing conditions remained commonplace by the early Twentieth Century, with one observer in July 1918 describing “Families and six and seven herding in one apartment and a hall bathroom doing service for half a dozen such families.”

Child labour was common since there were no schools, but a lot of children and poverty. Families did not know about contraception, and children's rights were unprotected. The working class was suffering from alcoholism.

Reacting to these conditions, parties, unions and communities like the ADAV General German Workers' Association were founded. The workers started strikes and formed parties such as the Social Democratic Party of Germany. Riots and demonstrations occurred.

== Overview ==
According to William Harbutt Dawson, despite being labeled socialist by his opponents, Bismarck's social legislation sought to preserve the existing economic order and state in Germany. This was in stark contrast to socialists, who sought to subvert the power of the existing state and eventually replace the capitalist order with a socialist economy.

The Prussian welfare state was developed by the German academic Sozialpolitiker (Social Policy Supporter) group, intellectually associated with the historical school of economics. At the time, the historical school of economics influenced social democracy in the United Kingdom and progressivism in the United States as well as the current post-World War II German economy (the social market economy) which is a continuation of similar policies.

== Social legislation ==
The 1880s were a period when Germany started on its long road towards the welfare state as it is today. The Centre, National Liberal and Social Democratic political parties were all involved in the beginnings of social legislation, but it was Bismarck who established the first practical aspects of this program. The program of the Social Democrats included all of the programs that Bismarck eventually implemented, but it also included programs designed to preempt the programs championed by radicals. Bismarck's idea was to implement the minimum aspects of these programs that were acceptable to the German government without any of the overtly socialistic aspects.

Bismarck opened debate on the subject on 17 November 1881 in the Imperial Message to the Reichstag, using the term practical Christianity to describe his program. In 1881, Bismarck had also referred to this program as Staatssozialismus ("State Socialism") when he made the following accurate prediction to a colleague:

It is possible that all our politics will come to nothing when I am dead but state socialism will drub itself in (Der Staatssozialismus paukt sich durch).

Bismarck's program centered squarely on insurance programs designed to increase productivity and focus the political attentions of German workers on supporting the Junker's government. The program included health insurance, accident insurance (workman's compensation), disability insurance and an old-age retirement pension, none of which then in existence to any great degree. After Bismarck left office in 1890, further social legislation regulated working time and conditions and sought to protect more vulnerable workers (women and children) and establish a system to allow redress for employer abuse.

Based on Bismarck's message, the Reichstag filed three bills designed to deal with the concept of accident insurance and one for health insurance, although other bills were passed after Bismarck left office. Retirement pensions and disability insurance were placed on the back burner for the time being.

In a speech on 20 March 1884, Otto von Bismarck stated:

The real grievance of the worker is the insecurity of his existence; he is not sure that he will always have work, he is not sure that if he will always be healthy, and he foresees that he will one day be old and unfit to work. If he falls into poverty, even if only through a prolonged illness, he is then completely helpless, left to his own devices, and society does not currently recognize any real obligation toward him beyond the usual help for the poor, even if he has been working all the time ever so faithfully and diligently. The usual help for the poor, however, leaves a lot to be desired, especially in large cities, where it is very much worse than in the country.

=== Health Insurance Bill of 1883 ===
The first bill that had success was the Health Insurance bill which was passed in 1883. The program was considered the least important from Bismarck's point of view and the least politically troublesome. The program was established to provide health insurance for the largest segment of the German workers. The health service was established on a local basis, with the cost divided between employers and the employed. The employers contributed one-third, the workers the rest. The contributions were made to "sickness funds" which employees could draw from when they needed medical care. The minimum payments for medical treatment and sick pay for up to 13 weeks were legally fixed. The individual local health bureaus were administered by a committee elected by the members of each bureau and this move had the unintended effect of establishing a majority representation for the workers on account of their large financial contribution. This worked to the advantage of the Social Democrats, who through heavy worker membership achieved their first small foothold in public administration. The legislation also entitled female factory workers to maternity leave benefits for three weeks following childbirth, although coverage was not mandatory.

=== Accident Insurance Bill of 1884 ===
Bismarck's government had to submit three draft bills before it could get one passed by the Reichstag in 1884. Bismarck had originally proposed that the federal government should pay a portion of the accident insurance contribution to show the willingness of the German government to lessen the hardship experienced by the German workers as a means of weaning them away from the various left-wing parties, most importantly the Social Democrats. The National Liberals took this program to be an expression of state socialism which they were strongly against. The Centre Party was afraid of the expansion of federal power at the expense of states' rights. The only way the program could be passed at all was for the entire expense to be underwritten by the employers. To facilitate this, Bismarck arranged for the administration of this program to be placed in the hands of "the organization of employers in occupational corporations". This organization established central and bureaucratic insurance offices on the federal and in some cases the state level to perform the actual administration. The program kicked in to replace the health insurance program as of the 14th week. It paid for medical treatment and a pension of up to two-thirds of earned wages if the worker was fully disabled. This program was expanded in 1886 to include agricultural workers.

=== Old Age and Disability Insurance Bill of 1889 ===
The old age pension program, financed by a tax on workers, was designed to provide a pension annuity for workers who reached the age of 70. At the time, the life expectancy for the average Prussian was 45, although this reflects the high infant mortality of the era and retired workers could expect to live until 70 years. Unlike accident insurance and health insurance, this program covered industrial, agrarian, artisans and servants from the start. Unlike the other two programs, the principle that the federal government should also contribute a portion of the underwriting cost, with the other two portions prorated accordingly, was accepted without question. The disability insurance program was intended to be used by those permanently disabled. This time, the state supervised the programs directly.

=== Workers Protection Act of 1891 ===
The law set up stricter regulations to ensure greater workplace safety, banned work on Sundays, introduced a maximum working day of eleven hours for women and ten hours for workers under 16 years of age and prohibited night work by them, banned those under the age of 13 from working in industry and encouraged the establishment of worker's committees in factories to address disputes. Industrial tribunals were set up to settle disputes between employees and employers.

=== Bakery working time regulation of 1896 ===
Issued by the Federal Council, this fixed the working time in bakeries at 12 hours.

=== Commercial Code of 1897 ===
This introduced improved regulations for the employment of commercial assistants, concerning matters such as benefits, salaries, and notice periods.

=== Labour regulation of 1897 ===
A regulation issued by the Federal Council that year restricted the working hours of young workers and children while also extending (as noted by one study) “industrial supervision to the workshops of clothing and linen manufacturers.”

=== Civil Code of 1900 ===
This gave a legal basis to the employment contracts of employees stipulating (as noted by one study) "among other things, that workers are also entitled to their wages in case of illness.”

=== Amendment to the Trade Code 1900 ===
This primarily regulated the protection of employees in open retail stores; with provisions on such matters as periods of rest and training.

=== Occupational safety regulations of 1902 ===
These were issued by the Federal Council for those employed in quarries and stonemasonry businesses. According to these regulations, as noted by one study, “young workers and adult female workers may not be employed in stone extraction and processing, as well as in the loading and transport of stones.” In addition, adult male workers “may not be employed for more than nine hours.”

=== Seamen's Ordinance of 1902 ===
Passed by the Reichstag, this delivered some improvements for sailors.

=== Children's Protection Act of 1903 ===
The law further tightened regulations on child labor to prevent exploitation of children.

=== Phosphorus match prohibition (1903) ===
The manufacture of phosphorus matches was prohibited that year by the Federal Council.

=== Amendment to the mining law (1906) ===
This changed the regulations governing miners' benefit associations, with members retaining their entitlements (as noted by one study) “upon transferring to another miners' benefit association and upon termination of their mining employment by paying a recognition fee.”

=== Federal Council regulation for tobacco and cigar manufacturing (1907) ===
This improved occupational safety regulations for tobacco and cigar manufacturing.

=== Amending Act of 1908 ===
This extended maternity protection, decreeing (as noted by one study) “that in undertakings which as a rule employed at least ten workers, women workers should not be employed before and after their confinement for a total period of eight weeks; their re-admission to employment was made dependent on a certificate that at least six weeks had passed since their confinement.”

=== Amendment to the Trade Regulations (1908) ===
Amongst other changes, this prohibited (as noted by one study) “the employment of female workers in surface mining for extraction (excluding processing), transport, and loading, as well as in coking plants and for transporting materials on construction sites.”

=== National Insurance Code of 1911 ===
This introduced survivors’ pensions for orphans and widows.

=== Domestic Work Act of 1911 ===
The first law to provide occupational safety for homeworkers, it contained health safeguards for employees working from home together with regulations on hazard and workplace safety.

=== Salaried Employees' Insurance Act of 1911 ===
This provided for special protection in cases of occupational disability while also setting up a dedicated insurance institution for commercial clerks, technicians, foremen, operational officials, and others in higher-level positions. The Act also extended mandatory insurance coverage to include salaried employees in a number of occupations who previously were not covered by invalidity insurance. This law provided more benefits to salaried employees than manual workers, such as the retirement age for salaried employees set at 65 while remaining 70 for manual workers, and salaried employees being entitled to a pension in the event of premature occupational disability. In addition, widows were entitled to support even if they were still able to work.

== Impact ==
Commenting on the effect that State Socialism had on German society, one study from 1908 argued that

It would be folly to maintain that State Socialism has been the sole cause of what is, comparatively speaking, the present remarkable prosperity of the German empire; and yet no one can doubt that no matter what other forces may have been at work, the policy of protecting the working-classes, and of ameliorating their condition of life, has been one powerful cause of the improved conditions. Industry in Germany is enjoying a prosperity equalled perhaps nowhere else. The exports have increased at a rate rarely equalled by any other country. The concentration of wealth has been no less striking than in the United States. Trusts, combinations, and pools have rendered industrial operations more economical, and relieved the nation of some of the ruinous costs of competition. Along with this enrichment of the capitalist has proceeded an amelioration of the living and working conditions of the people. The state insurance system of Germany distributes over $100,000,000 every year to the working-class in the form of benefits and indemnities. The municipalities have so improved the living conditions in the cities that to-day there are practically no slums in Germany. The aged and sick, the injured in industry, all have their little patrimony to keep them from want. There is poverty in Germany, wages are low, conditions are still intolerable; but the improvement over the old days and over the conditions still obtaining in neighboring countries gives one the impression that there is no dire want in the German empire.

== See also ==
- Anti-socialist laws
- Mustafa Kemal Atatürk
- Celal Bayar
- Communitarianism
- Compassionate conservatism
- Conservatism in Germany
- Criticism of socialism
- Right Hegelianism
- History of the Social Democratic Party of Germany
- İsmet İnönü
- Kemalism
- Liberalism in Germany
- Preussentum und Sozialismus
- Rhine capitalism
- Nordic model
- Ordoliberalism
- Paternalistic conservatism
- Social conservatism
- Social corporatism
- Social market
- State capitalism
- State socialism
- Tory socialism
- Traditionalist conservatism
- Welfare capitalism
- Welfare state
- Yellow socialism
