= Tory socialism =

Conservative support for active government

Tory socialism is a term used by some historians, particularly of the early Fabian Society, a socialist British organization, to describe the governing philosophy of the prime minister Benjamin Disraeli. It has been used by Vernon Bogdanor to describe the thinking of Ferdinand Mount, and was used by Arnold Toynbee to describe the beliefs of Joseph Rayner Stephens and Richard Oastler. The phrase was also used to describe both Stanley Baldwin and Harold Macmillan in the 1930s, and by Tony Judge in his biographical study of Robert Blatchford, and in a wider study of Tory socialism between 1870 and 1940.

Online publication Country Squire Magazine published an article on Tory socialism, wherein the author described Tory socialists as being "alienated Tory radicals who denounce liberal capitalism, instead of praising it for it [sic] revolutionary role, as the destroyer of popular community and moral economy." In The Spectator, journalist and historian Tim Stanley wrote: "Call it One Nation, paternalism or, if you're feeling cheeky, Tory socialism − a philosophy, not a doctrine, because it begins by rejecting economic dogma, even materialism on the basis that man does not live by bread alone. Its genius is that it makes culture the engine of policy." He defined Tory socialism as "an approach to politics that puts the spiritual before the economic, and which situates the human being within a community that is shaped by tradition and custom." He also harkened back to when Tories were the party of protectionism and social reform.

The term is used by many free-market advocates to describe certain strains of conservatism that are more reformist-minded and believe in a more activist government, such as paternalistic conservatism. The domestic policies of Richard Nixon were stated by some American libertarians, such as Murray Rothbard, to be Tory socialist, which they believed had much in common with what they labelled as the big government conservatism espoused by neoconservatives. It was in keeping with this that David Gelernter wrote a long essay in The Weekly Standard extolling Disraeli as the founder of modern conservatism.

== See also ==
- Bourgeois socialism
- Conservative corporatism
- One-nation conservatism
- Red Tory
- Yellow socialism
