= Bourgeois socialism =

Political terminology and perspective

Bourgeois socialism or conservative socialism (i.e. conservation of the mode of production, not to be confused with social conservatism) was a term used by Karl Marx and Friedrich Engels in various pieces, including in The Communist Manifesto. Conservative socialism was used as a rebuke by Marx for certain strains of socialism but has also been used by proponents of such a system. Bourgeois socialists are described as those that advocate for preserving the existing mode of production while only attempting to eliminate perceived evils of the system (e.g. economic reforms while preserving the rule by the bourgeoisie). Conservative socialism and right-wing socialism are also used as a descriptor, and in some cases as a pejorative, by free-market conservative and right-libertarian movements and politicians to describe more economically interventionist strands of conservatism, such as paternalistic conservatism.

== Perspectives and usage ==
The Marxist view is such that the bourgeois socialist is the sustainer of the state of bourgeois class relations. In The Principles of Communism, Friedrich Engels describes them as "so-called socialists" who only seek to remove the evils inherent in capitalist society while maintaining the existing society often relying on methods, such as welfare systems and grandiose claims of social reform. Opinions vary as to whether if bourgeois socialist is actively protecting or intentionally excusing the current order, but the common thread is that they are in objective fact preserving it. Rather than abolishing social class divisions, they wish to simply raise everyone up to be a member of the bourgeoisie to allow everyone the ability to endlessly accumulate capital without a working class. In The Communist Manifesto, Marx and Engels use philanthropists, feminists ("temperance fanatics") and political reformers as examples of this type of socialism that they saw as opposed to their own aims. In expressing their views on the subject, Marx referenced Pierre-Joseph Proudhon's The Philosophy of Poverty, stating the following about bourgeois socialism: "The Socialistic bourgeois want all the advantages of modern social conditions without the struggles and dangers necessarily resulting therefrom." Bourgeois socialists are considered as working for the enemies of communists by preserving the society that communists seek to overthrow thus Engels claims that communists must continuously struggle against them.

Right-wing socialism is used as a pejorative term by some free-market conservative and right-libertarian movements, politicians, and economists, such as Murray Rothbard and Jesús Huerta de Soto, to describe economic interventionist variants of conservatism they see supporting paternalism and solidarity as opposed to commercialism, individualism, and laissez-faire economics. They argue that paternalist conservatism supports state promoted social hierarchy and allows certain people and groups to hold higher status in such a hierarchy which is conservative. Right-wing socialism is also used to refer to moderate social democratic forms of socialism when contrasted with Marxism–Leninism and other more radical left-wing alternatives. During the post-war period in Japan, the Japan Socialist Party divided itself into two different socialist parties, usually distinguished into the Leftist Socialist Party of Japan (officially the Japanese Socialist Party in English) and the Rightist Socialist Party of Japan (officially the Social Democratic Party of Japan in English). The latter received over 10 per cent of the vote in the 1952 and 1953 general elections and was a centre-left, moderate social democratic party. Agrarian socialism, guild socialism, military socialism, National Bolshevism, national syndicalism, Peronism, Prussian socialism, state socialism, and Strasserism are sometimes termed right-wing socialism by various authors. Historian Ishay Landa has described the nature of right-wing socialism as decidedly capitalist.

== Proponents and practice ==
=== Monarchical socialism ===
An early proponent of conservative socialism was 19th-century Austrian politician Klemens von Metternich as early as 1847. Monarchists had begun to use socialism as an antithesis of bourgeois laissez-faire, indicating reliance on a social conscience as opposed to pure individualism. Metternich said the aims of such a conservative socialism were "peaceful, class-harmonizing, cosmopolitan, traditional". Monarchical socialism promoted social paternalism portraying the monarch as having a fatherly duty to protect his people from the effects of free economic forces. Metternich's conservative socialism saw liberalism and nationalism as forms of middle-class dictatorship over commoners.

Johann Karl Rodbertus, a monarchist conservative landowner and lawyer who briefly served as minister of education in Prussia in 1848, promoted a form of state socialism led by an enlightened monarchy supporting regulatory economics through the state. Rodbertus supported the elimination of private ownership of land, with the state in control of national capital rather than redistribution of private capital, a position known as state capitalism. In the 1880s, Rodbertus' conservative socialism was promoted as a non-revolutionary alternative to social democracy and a means to justify the acceptance of Otto von Bismarck's State Socialism policies.

=== War Socialism ===
During World War I, the German government issued total mobilization of the economy and social sphere for war, resulting in government regulation of the private and public sector. This was referred to as the war economy (Kriegswirtschaft) or War Socialism (Kriegssozialismus). War Socialism was coined by General Erich Ludendorff, a prominent proponent of the system.

In War Socialism, the militarized state exercised controls and regulations over the entire economy. In Germany, the War Socialist economy was operated by conservative military men and industrialists, who had historically been hostile to socialism. Its goal was to maximize war production and to control worker discontent that was growing amongst the organized labour movement. A leading proponent in Germany of War Socialism was General Wilhelm Groener, who insisted against objections of business leaders that labour union representatives be included in factory labour committees as well as regional food and labour boards. This was achieved and gave German unions collective bargaining rights and official functions in the German state for the first time in history.

War Socialism existed in other European countries involved in the war. In the United Kingdom, a number of public figures promoted the adoption of War Socialism, including Winston Churchill and David Lloyd George. Tsarist Russia had War Socialism. Sociologist Pitirim Sorokin argues that War Socialism had existed for two hundred years in support of the Russian tsarist regime until their overthrow in 1917. The War Socialist economy of Russia was based upon that in Germany and was supported by non-socialist and socialist parties alike.

== See also ==
- Blue Labour
- Reformism
- Chiangism
- Class collaboration
- Conservative revolution
- Fascist corporatism
- Democratic socialism
- Nazism
- Ordoliberalism
- Prussianism and Socialism
- Reactionary
- Red Tory
- Michael Harrington
- Revisionism (Marxism)
- Syncretic politics
- Third Position
- Tory socialism
- Werner Sombart
- Yellow socialism
