= Paternalistic conservatism =

Strand of conservatism

Paternalistic conservatism is a strand of conservatism which reflects the belief that societies exist, and develop, organically, and that members within them have obligations towards each other. There is particular emphasis on the paternalistic obligation, referencing the feudal concept of noblesse oblige, of those who are privileged and wealthy to the poorer parts of society. Consistent with principles such as duty, hierarchy, and organicism, it can be seen as an outgrowth of traditionalist conservatism. Paternalistic conservatives do not support the individual or the state in principle but are instead prepared to support either or recommend a balance between the two depending on what is most practical.

Paternalistic conservatism emphasizes the duties of the government to entail fairly broad state interventionism to cultivate a good life for all citizens. This leads to a dirigiste path in which the government is envisaged as a benevolent paternal figure setting goals and ensuring fair play and equal opportunity, with a stress on the importance of a social safety net to deal with poverty and support of redistribution of wealth, along with government regulation of markets in the interests of both consumers and producers. Although accepting of state intervention, paternalistic conservatives are not supportive of anything resembling a command economy.

Paternalistic conservatism first arose as a result of the industrial revolution during the 19th century, which had created social unrest, appalling working conditions and inequality. In the United Kingdom, Benjamin Disraeli's one-nation conservatism sought to deal with these effects. In the United Kingdom, there has been a continuation of one-nation conservative governments, such as those of Stanley Baldwin, Neville Chamberlain, Winston Churchill, and Harold Macmillan. During the 19th century in Germany, Otto von Bismarck established the first modern welfare state, with the goal of undermining socialism by gaining working-class support. He implemented policies of state-organised compulsory insurance for workers against sickness, accident, incapacity and old age as part of his State Socialism programme. Leo von Caprivi also promoted a policy called the New Course.

== Origins ==
Paternalistic conservatism has its origins in the Industrial Revolution, which had caused widespread economic inequality, poverty, and social discontent. In the United Kingdom, Tory politicians, such as Richard Oastler, Michael Thomas Sadler and Lord Shaftesbury combined their elitist responsibility and a strong humanitarian element with their involvement on the Factory Acts. Critical of individualism and classical economics, they also disliked the 1834 New Poor Law and believed in the role of the state in guaranteeing decent housing, working conditions, wages and treatment of the poor.

=== One-nation conservatism ===
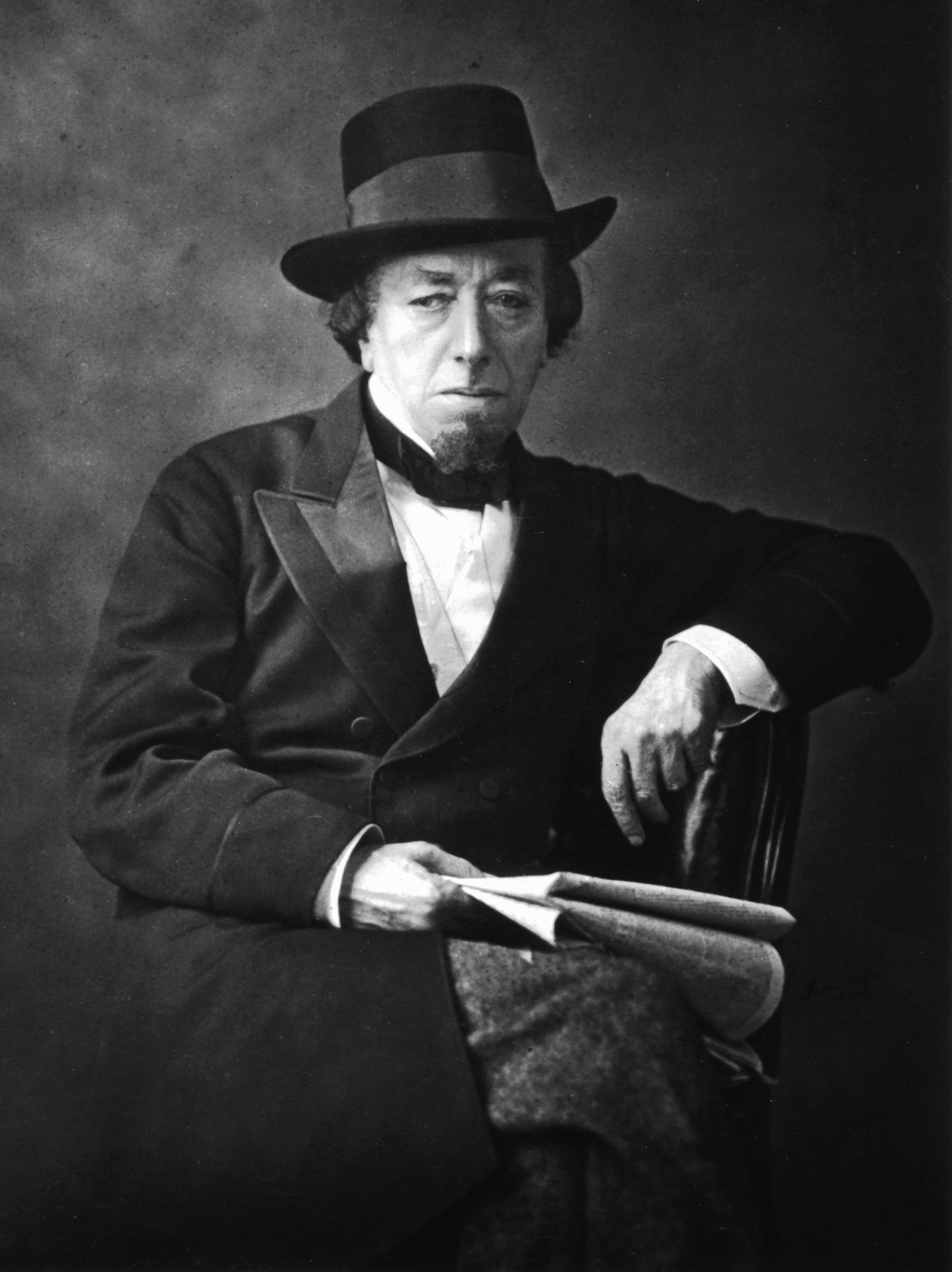
Benjamin Disraeli is widely considered to be the architect of one-nation conservatism.

One-nation conservatism was first conceived in the United Kingdom by Conservative prime minister Benjamin Disraeli, who presented his political philosophy in two novels, Coningsby and Sybil, Or The Two Nations, published in 1844 and 1845, respectively. Disraeli proposed a paternalistic society with the social classes intact but the working class receiving support from the well off. He emphasised the importance of social obligation rather than the individualism that pervaded British society. Disraeli warned that the United Kingdom would become divided into two nations (of the rich and poor) as a result of increased industrialisation and inequality. Concerned at that division, he supported measures to improve the lives of the people, to provide social support and to protect the working classes.

Disraeli justified his ideas by his belief in an organic society in which the different classes have natural obligations to one another. He saw society as naturally hierarchical and emphasised the obligations of those at the top to those below. This was a continuation of the feudal concept of noblesse oblige, which asserted that the aristocracy had an obligation to be generous and honourable. To Disraeli, that implied that government should be paternalistic. One-nation conservatism identifies its approach as pragmatic and non-ideological. There is an acceptance of the need for flexible policies, and one-nation conservatives have often sought compromise with their ideological opponents for the sake of social stability. Disraeli justified his views pragmatically, arguing that should the ruling class become indifferent to the suffering of the people, society would become unstable and social revolution would become a possibility.

== By country ==
=== Argentina ===
Peronism is considered a paternalistic ideology. However, traditional Peronism tends to support a command economy, unlike common paternalistic conservatives. Some scholars evaluate Peronism as a mixture of 'militant laborism' and 'traditional conservatism'.

=== Australia ===
Australia's longest-serving prime minister, Robert Menzies, maintained a strong role for government and protectionism, described as a form of state paternalism. While Menzies founded the Australian Liberal Party and used anti-socialist rhetoric, he also opposed laissez-faire economics.

=== Canada ===
A red Tory is an adherent of a political philosophy derived from the Tory tradition, predominantly in Canada but also in the United Kingdom. This philosophy tends to favour social policies that are communitarian, while maintaining a degree of fiscal discipline and a respect of the political order. In Canada, red Toryism is found in provincial and federal Conservative political parties. The history of red Toryism marks differences in the development of the political cultures of Canada and the United States. Canadian conservatism and American conservatism have been different from each other in fundamental ways, including their stances on social issues and the role of government in society.

=== China ===
Chiangism is the right-wing authoritarian nationalist ideology of Chiang Kai-shek, the President of China. (Note: Chiang Kai-shek was the president of mainland China, named the "Republic of China," until 1949. He ruled Taiwan since 1945 and has since been considered the president of Taiwan, as the Great Retreat in 1949 handed over the territory of mainland China to the Chinese Communist Party; see President of the Republic of China.) Chiang championed traditional Chinese political philosophy, was conservative in education and convictions, and believed in the virtues of paternalistic authoritarianism. Chiang was an hardline anti-communist, but based on the Three Principles of the People, he implemented a Georgist land policy, and it has distanced itself from Western-style liberal capitalism by implementing dirigisme-based people's welfare policies.

=== France ===
In Europe, Catholic political movements emerged in the 19th century as a response to widespread deterioration of social conditions and rising anti-clerical and democratic tendencies amongst artisans and workers. It mixed social commitment, paternalistic social welfare, and authoritarian patronage from above with deepening popular piety.

=== Germany ===
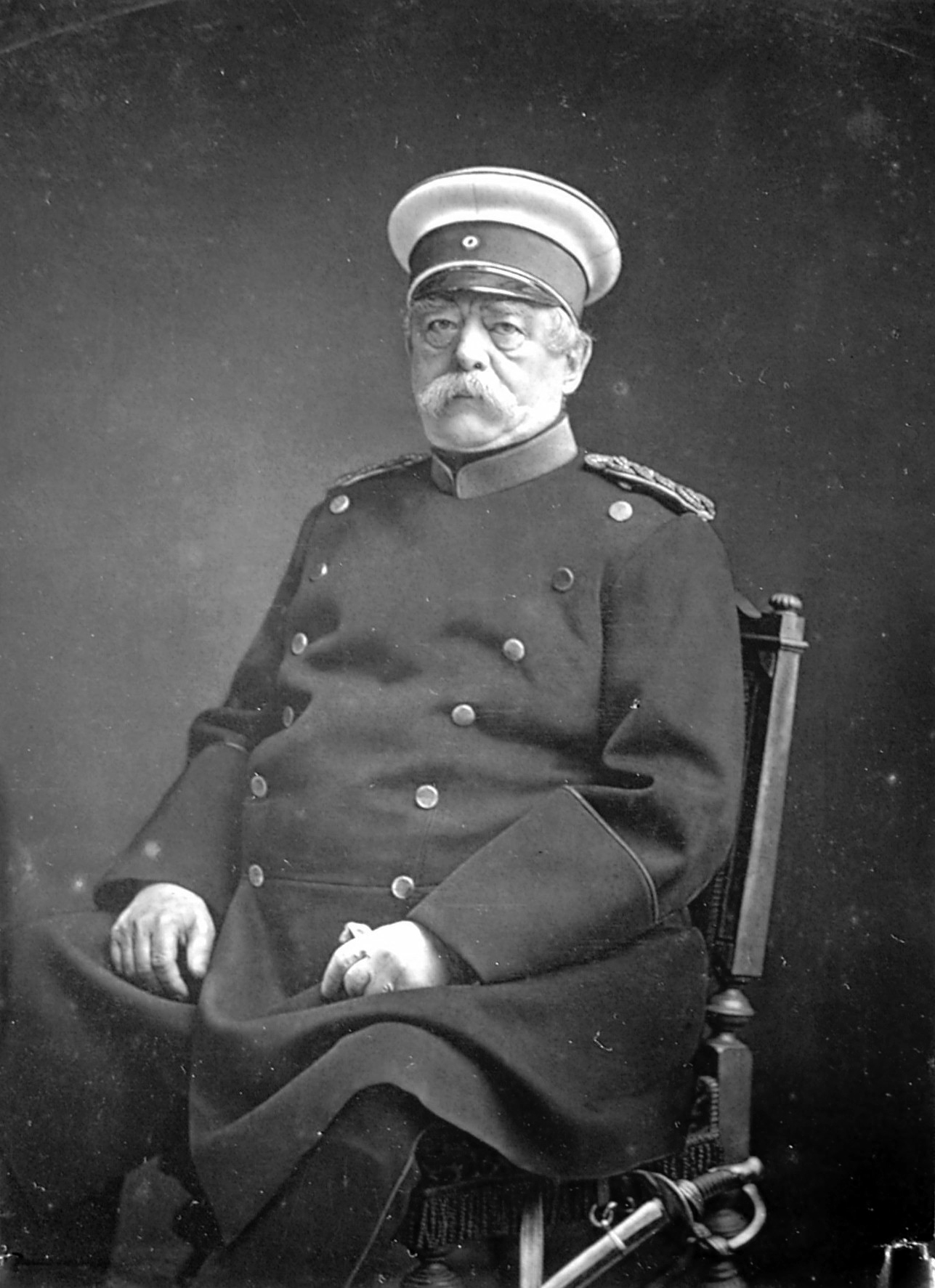
Otto von Bismarck, who promoted State Socialism as remedial measures to appease the working class and detract support for socialism and the Social Democratic Party of Germany following earlier attempts to achieve the same objective through Bismarck's Anti-Socialist Laws

In 1878, the German conservative and Lutheran figure Adolf Stoecker founded the Christian Social Workers' Party with intent to align workers with Protestant Christianity and the German monarchy. Stoecker respected existing social hierarchies but also desired a state that would be active in protecting the poor and vulnerable citizens. On occasion, Stoecker used antisemitic rhetoric to gain support; he urged supporters to practice Christian love even towards Jews.

As Chancellor of Germany, Otto von Bismarck pursued a state-building strategy designed to make ordinary Germans more loyal to the country, implementing the modern welfare state in Germany during the 1880s. Bismarck was fearful of a socialist revolution, and he created the first welfare state in the modern world with the goal of gaining working class support that might otherwise go to his socialist opponents. He adopted policies of state-organised compulsory insurance for workers to guard against sickness, accident, incapacity and old age in what has been named State Socialism. The term State Socialism was coined by Bismarck's German liberal opposition; it was later accepted by Bismarck. Bismarck was a conservative, not a socialist, and he enacted the Anti-Socialist Laws. Bismark's State Socialism was based upon Romanticist political thought in which the state was supreme and carried out Bismarck's agenda of supporting "the protest of collectivism against individualism" and of "nationality against cosmopolitanism" and stated that "the duty of the State is to maintain and promote the interests, the well-being of the nation as such". Rather, his actions were designed to offset the growth of the Social Democratic Party of Germany. In addition, the policy of nationalization of the Prussian state railways was established after the unification of Germany, bringing transportation under the control of the state.

=== Japan ===
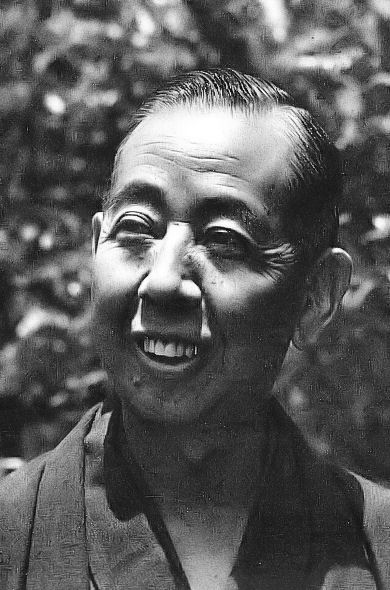
Prior to the 1980s, nationalists in the LDP, including Nobusuke Kishi, supported paternalistic welfare policy.

During the post-war Japan, policies led by the right-wing conservative Liberal Democratic Party (LDP) became a political model closer to paternalistic democracy than Western-style liberal democracy. In many ways, modern Japan is considered to be a paternalistic state including socially conservative elements, such as Confucian tradition. In the case of the LDP administration under the 1955 System in Japan, their degree of economic control was stronger than that of Western conservative governments; it was also positioned closer to social democracy at that time. Since the 1970s, the oil crisis has slowed economic growth and increased the resistance of urban citizens to policies that favour farmers. To maintain its dominant position, the LDP sought to expand party supporters by incorporating social security policies and pollution measures advocated by opposition parties. It was also historically closely positioned to corporate statism.

Founded in 1960, the Democratic Socialist Party (DSP) officially supported social democracy. Due to its Japanese nationalist, anti-communist, and socially conservative nature, it was politically different from ordinary social democrats and was more politically close to the right-wing LDP, and was regarded as a conservative political party in Japan at the time.

=== United States ===
In the United States, Theodore Roosevelt has been the main figure identified with progressive conservatism as a political tradition. Roosevelt stated that he had "always believed that wise progressivism and wise conservatism go hand in hand". Roosevelt's ideas, such that of New Nationalism, an extension of his earlier philosophy of the Square Deal, have been described as paternalistic and contrasted with the individualistic program, The New Freedom, of Woodrow Wilson from the Democratic Party. Wilson's program in practice has been described as resembling the more paternalistic ideas of Roosevelt, excluding the notion of reining in judges.

The Republican Party administration of William Howard Taft was progressive conservative and he described himself as "a believer in progressive conservatism". Dwight D. Eisenhower also declared himself an advocate of progressive conservatism.

== Perspectives ==
Unlike many free market conservative ideologies like liberal conservatism and right-libertarianism, paternalistic conservatism supports paternalism and social solidarity as opposed to commercialism, individualism, and laissez-faire economics. Because of this, it is sometimes labelled "right-wing socialism" or "conservative socialism" pejoratively by free market economists, including Murray Rothbard and Jesús Huerta de Soto. Huerta de Soto also argues that paternalist conservatism supports a state-promoted social hierarchy, maintaining the privileges afforded to certain groups in society.

Although paternalistic conservatives are accepting of state intervention, it is within the context of a market-based social democratic or social market mixed economy. They do not support an economy resembling a command or planned economy, or an economy in which there is public control over the means of production, one of the stated goals of socialism.

Paternalistic conservatives justify their pragmatic approach by asserting that if the ruling classes become indifferent to the hardships and suffering experienced by the common people, it could lead to societal and political instability eventually leading to violent revolution. Subsequently policies must be implemented to address the needs of all classes within society in order to maintain social harmony. Furthermore, paternalistic conservatives support equality of opportunity and fair play, aiming to ensure that there remains a level playing field for individuals to pursue success based on merit.

== See also ==
- Christian democracy
- Compassionate conservatism
- Gandhian socialism
- High Tory
- Jamaica Labour Party
- Kōchikai
- National-Social Association
- Peronism
- Preussentum und Sozialismus
- Social conservatism
- Tory socialism
- Yellow socialism
- Left-conservatism

== Bibliography ==
- Adams, Ian (2001). Political Ideology Today. Manchester University Press. ISBN 978-0-7190-6020-5.
- Arnold, Dana (2004). Cultural Identities and the Aesthetics of Britishness. Manchester University Press. ISBN 978-0719067693.
- Bloor, Kevin (2012). The Definitive Guide to Political Ideologies. ISBN 978-1449067618.
- Dorey, Peter (1995). The Conservative Party and the Trade Unions. Psychology Press. ISBN 0-415-06487-2.
- Gjorshoski, Nikola (2016). "The Ideological Specific of the Variants of Contemporary Conservatism" (PDF). Journal of Liberty and International Affairs. 2(1).
- Heywood, Andrew (2015). "Political Ideas and Ideologies" (PDF). Politics. Red Globe Press – via ESL Writing.
- Heywood, Andrew (2007). Political Ideologies. Palgrave Macmillan. ISBN 978-0230521803.
- Heywood, Andrew (2012). Political Ideologies: An Introduction. Palgrave Macmillan. ISBN 978-0-230-36994-8.
- Heywood, Andrew (2013). Politics. Palgrave Macmillan. ISBN 978-1-137-27244-7.
- Heywood, Andrew (2017). Political Ideologies: An Introduction. Palgrave Macmillan. ISBN 978-1-137-60604-4.
- Huerta de Soto, Jesús (2010). Socialism, Economic Calculation and Entrepreneurship Fourth edition. Edward Elgar Publishing. ISBN 978-1-849-80500-1.
- Steinberg, Jonathan (2011). Bismarck: A Life. Oxford University Press. ISBN 978-0-19-997539-6.
- Vincent, Andrew (2009). Modern Political Ideologies. John Wiley & Sons. ISBN 978-1-444-31105-1.
