= Andrew Heywood =

British political scientist

Andrew Heywood is a British author of textbooks on politics and political science. Heywood was Vice Principal of Croydon College, having previously been Director of Studies at Orpington College, and Head of Politics at Farnborough Sixth-Form College.

== Bibliography ==
- Political Ideologies: An Introduction (1992, Palgrave MacMillan)
- Political Ideas and Concepts: An Introduction (1994, Palgrave MacMillan)
- Political Theory: An Introduction, first appeared as Political Ideas and Concepts: An Introduction (1994, Palgrave MacMillan)
- Politics (1997, Palgrave MacMillan)
- Key Concepts in Politics (2000, Palgrave MacMillan)
- British Politics (2008, Palgrave MacMillan)
- Essentials of UK Politics (2008, Palgrave MacMillan)
- Global Politics (2011, Palgrave MacMillan)
- Key Concepts in Politics and International Relations (2015, Palgrave)
- Essentials of UK Politics: For AS and A-Level (2017, Palgrave)

== See also ==
- Mike Arrington
