= Extremism of the centre =

Sociological term

Extremism of the centre is a term in sociology introduced by Seymour Martin Lipset. In his book Political Man (1960), he wrote that left-wing extremism has its basis in the lower classes and the working class, while right-wing extremism is anchored in the upper classes, and fascism originates in the socioeconomic middle class. He did not define the term fascism further. This analysis was extended by the sociologist Theodor Geigers, who explained the election success of the Nazi Party in the early 1930s as a reaction from the Mittelstand (the section of the economy composed of small and medium-sized businesses), and related his analysis to the contemporary analysis of extremist and anti-democratic movements of the middle of society. This added a new type to the extremism of the left and right, and explained fascism as a typically middle-class movement.

Jürgen R. Winkler ranks Lipset's theory, together with the work of Richard Hofstadter (The Pseudo-Conservative Revolt), as an important theory in the research of right-wing extremism. Similar to the theories of relative deprivation, Lipset's theory concerns the belonging of individuals to collectives, their perceptions of their economic and social situation, and their mental state. According to Winkler, Lipset's theory, in which people who see their status as at risk are prone to supporting right-wing extremist movements, is very influential within this research.

The socioeconomic analysis Hitlers Wähler (1991) by Jürgen W. Falter puts the middle class thesis of the rise of Nazism into perspective. Falter found out that while indeed 40% of Nazi voters came from the middle class, the working class also represented a significant voter group. The most significant social characteristic of a Nazi Party voter was religious denomination, with Protestants voting for the Nazis much more than Catholics.

In the 1990s, the term became a political buzzword in Germany, which was used alongside a criticism of society in general. With their positioning in the discussions about Leitkultur, multiculturalism, nation and immigration, and the political and economic elites, and not the far-right parties themselves, are said to promote far-right ideas, and this prepares the way to an authoritarian society.

== See also ==
- Political spectrum
- Social class
