= Francis Wilson (political scientist) =

American political scientist

Francis Graham Wilson (1901–1976), was a professor of political science at the University of Illinois (1939–67).
