= 1998 Progressive Conservative leadership election =

1998 Progressive Conservative Party leadership election
- October 24 & November 14, 1998

30,100 points 15,051 point votes needed to win
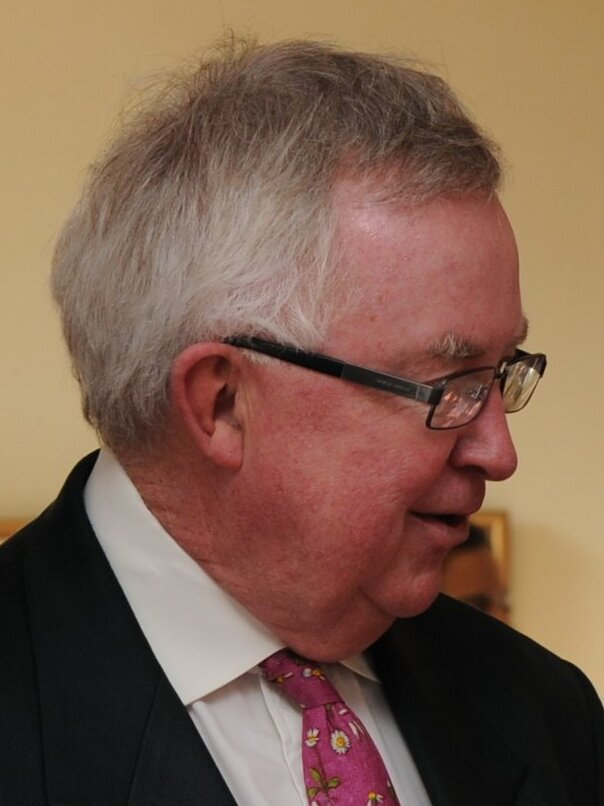

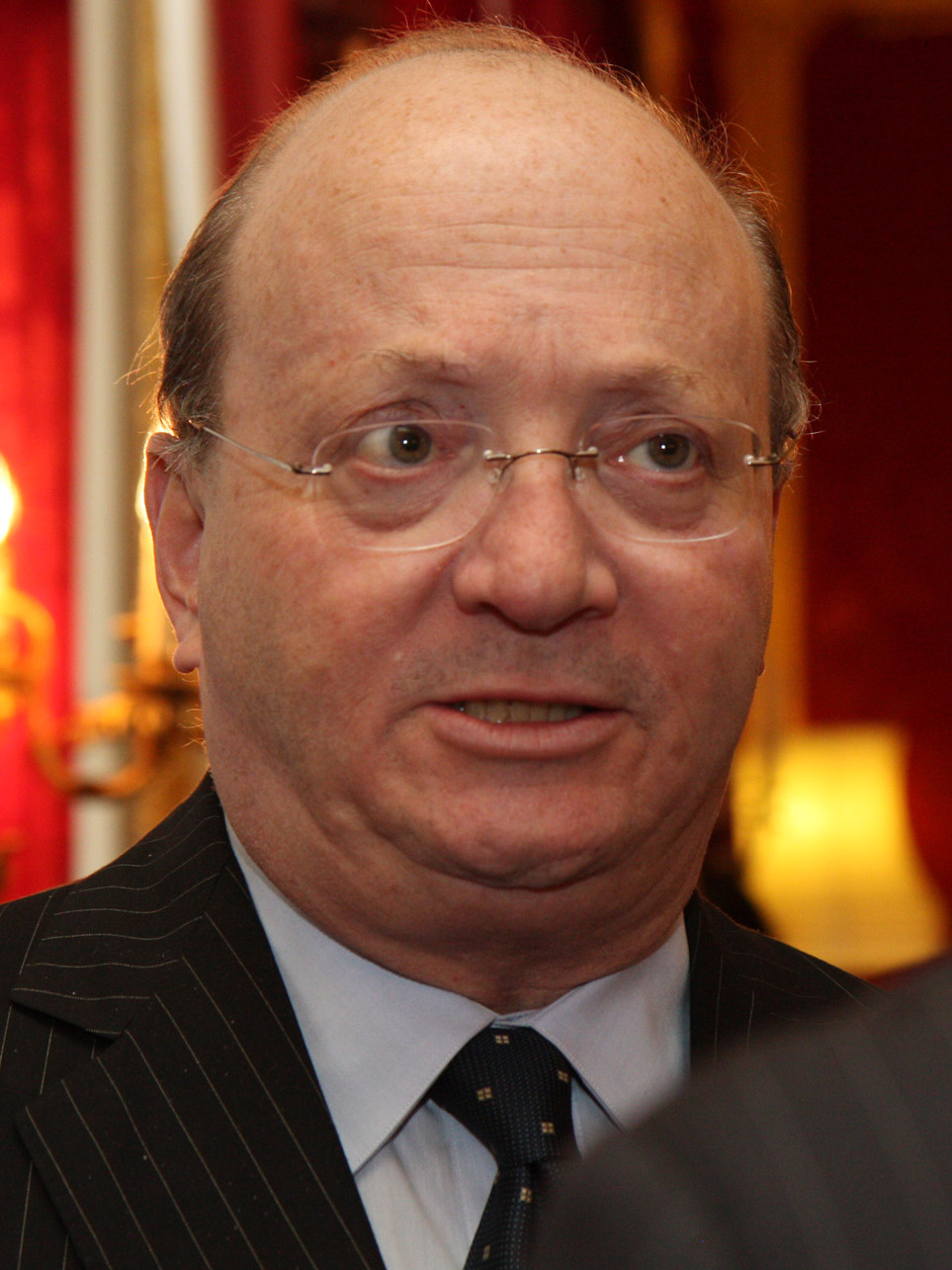

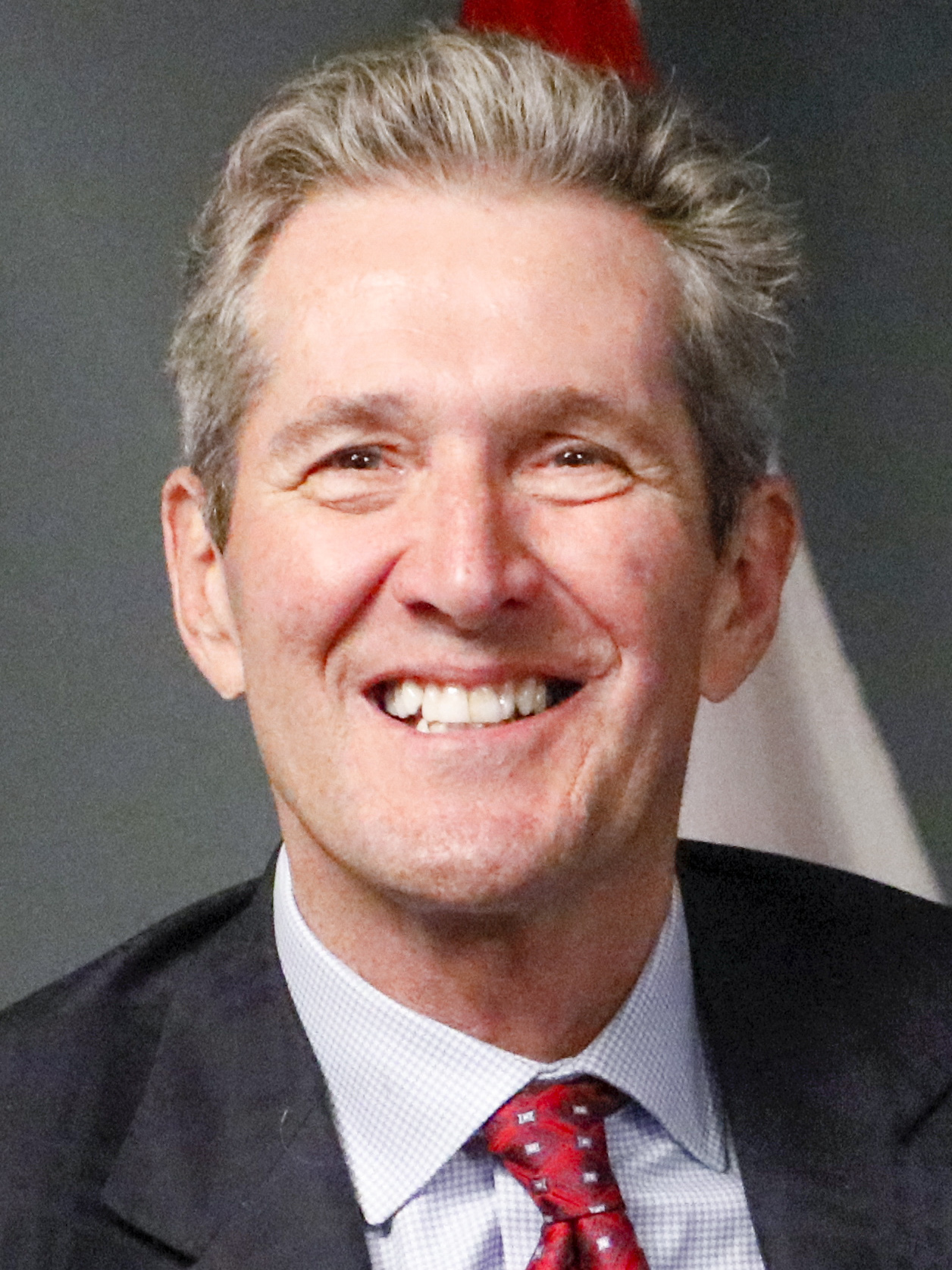
| | | PC |
| Candidate | Joe Clark | David Orchard |
| Second ballot points | 23,321 (77.5%) | 6,779 (22.5%) |
| First ballot points | 14,592 (48.5%) | 4,916 (16.3%) |
| Candidate | Hugh Segal | Brian Pallister |
| Second ballot points | Withdrew | Withdrew |
| First ballot points | 5,689 (18.9%) | 3,676 (12.2%) |
Leader before election
Elsie Wayne (interim)
Elected Leader
Joe Clark

1998 Progressive Conservative leadership election
- Date: First ballot: October 24, 1998; Second ballot: November 14, 1998
- Convention: Ottawa
- Resigning leader: Jean Charest
- Won by: Joe Clark
- Ballots: 2
- Candidates: 5
- Entrance fee: C$30,000
- Spending limit: None

The 1998 Progressive Conservative leadership election was held on October 24 and November 14, 1998 to choose a successor to Jean Charest. This was the first time the Progressive Conservatives used a one member, one vote system to choose a leader rather than a delegated leadership convention, which has been the norm since 1927. The 1998 election used a point system that allocated 100 points to each riding, regardless of the number of votes cast in the riding. The candidate who won a majority of points (not necessarily a majority of voters) would win the leadership. All party members were eligible to cast a vote. If no candidate received a majority of points on the first ballot, the lowest ranking candidate would be automatically eliminated and a second ballot was to be held using a preferential ballot if more than two candidates remained. The 100-point-per-riding system was again used by the Conservative Party of Canada in their leadership elections.

== Background ==
The Progressive Conservatives had formed two back-to-back majority governments under Brian Mulroney from 1984 to 1993 but in the 1993 federal election under leader Kim Campbell, the party had almost been completely wiped out. The rise of the Bloc Québécois in Quebec, led by former Progressive Conservative cabinet minister Lucien Bouchard, and the conservative Reform Party in Western Canada caused the PCs to lose their electoral base. Charest, the runner up to Campbell in the 1993 leadership convention was one of only two PC MPs elected in 1993 and became party leader. Under his leadership, the party won 20 seats in the 1997 federal election but still placed fifth. By 1998, Bouchard had become leader of the provincial Parti Québécois and had promised a further Quebec referendum on independence should there be "winning conditions". With the opposition Quebec Liberal Party seeking a new leader, Charest was under considerable public and political pressure, especially among business circles, to leave federal politics and become leader of the Quebec Liberal Party as he was considered the best hope among federalists to defeat the PQ. Charest announced on March 28, 1998 that he was resigning as federal Progressive Conservative leader in order to seek the leadership of the Quebec Liberal Party.

The Progressive Conservatives, meanwhile, after two successive electoral defeats were under pressure from a Unite the Right movement for the Progressive Conservatives to co-operate with the Reform Party of Canada; Manitoba Tory cabinet minister Brian Pallister, Major-General Lewis MacKenzie, former Reform MP Stephen Harper, former Manitoba premier Gary Filmon, Alberta premier Ralph Klein, and former Alberta treasurer Jim Dinning were all encouraged to run as Unite the Right candidates for leader - with Pallister proceeding to do so. Conversely, the movement was resisted by Red Tories who sought a standard-bearer who would keep the party independent.

== Timeline ==
=== 1998 ===
- March 2 – Quebec Liberal leader Daniel Johnson, Jr. announces his resignation as party leader.
- March 26 – Jean Charest announces he is resigning as federal Progressive Conservative leader in order to seek the leadership of the Quebec Liberal Party.
- April 2 – Charest resigns as party leader, and as an MP. Elsie Wayne, the party's longest-serving MP after Charest, is appointed as interim leader, and announces that she will not seek the permanent leadership of the party.
- April 29 – The party executive announces that the next leader will not be chosen by a delegated convention but by a point system with ballots cast by all party members.
- June 9 – Tory strategist Hugh Segal announces his candidacy.
- June 10 – Former Manitoba cabinet minister Brian Pallister announces his candidacy.
- June 25 – Former prime minister Joe Clark announces his candidacy; he receives the endorsement of 11 out of 19 PC MPs.
- July 22 – Anti-free trade campaigner David Orchard announces his candidacy.
- July 27 – Montreal lawyer Michael Fortier announces his candidacy.
- July 31 – Deadline for candidates to file their nomination papers and pay their entry fees.
- October 23 – All candidates debate.
- October 24 – First ballot.
- November 14 – Second ballot.

== Candidates ==
- Joe Clark, 59, had been party leader from 1976 to 1983 and Prime Minister of Canada from 1979 to 1980. Clark served as Secretary of State for External Affairs (1984–1991) and then as Minister of Constitutional Affairs (1991–1993) negotiated the Charlottetown Accord.
- Hugh Segal, 48, was a prominent Red Tory strategist, policy analyst, and commentator, who served as a senior aide to Ontario Premier Bill Davis in the 1970s and 1980s and as Chief of Staff to Prime Minister Mulroney from 1992 to 1993.
- Brian Pallister, 44, was a provincial politician who had served as Minister of Government Services in the Manitoba government of Gary Filmon from 1995 to 1997 before resigning to unsuccessfully run as a federal Progressive Conservative in 1998. He ran on a platform of trying to attract Reform Party supporters and conservative economic strategies.
- Michael Fortier, 36, was a prominent Quebec lawyer and investment broker who advocated a dialogue with Reform Party supporters but said he did not favour a merger. He supported tax cuts, a Triple-E Senate, term limits for Members of Parliament and a voucher system for university students.
- David Orchard, 48, was a Saskatchewan farmer and a prominent opponent of globalization and both the Canada–United States Free Trade Agreement and the North American Free Trade Agreement as well as any co-operation with the Reform Party. Considered an outsider who had no previous affiliation with the party, Orchard had a large following among free trade opponents and hoped to sign up enough new members to the party in order to win election under the new One Member One Vote system.

== Results ==
Points by ballot
| Candidate | First Ballot October 24 | | Second Ballot November 14 | |
| Candidate | Points | % | Points | % |
|---|---|---|---|---|
| Joe Clark | 14,592 | 48.5% | 23,321 | 77.5% |
| David Orchard | 4,916 | 16.3% | 6,779 | 22.5% |
| Hugh Segal | 5,689 | 18.9% | Endorsed Clark | |
| Brian Pallister | 3,676 | 12.2% | Endorsed Clark | |
| Michael Fortier | 1,227 | 4.1% | Endorsed Clark | |
| Total | 30,100 | 100.0% | 30,100 | 100.0% |

First round
| Clark | 48.48% |
| Segal | 18.90% |
| Orchard | 16.33% |
| Pallister | 12.21% |
| Fortier | 4.08% |

Final round
| Clark | 77.48% |
| Orchard | 22.52% |

Fortier was automatically eliminated; as Clark had only narrowly fallen short of a majority and had a wide lead over his closest opponent, Pallister and Segal withdrew and endorsed Clark for the sake of party unity and to forestall running up campaign debts needlessly. Orchard refused to do so and went on to the second ballot.

== See also ==
- Progressive Conservative leadership conventions
