= Jake Hoeppner =

Canadian politician

Jake E. Hoeppner MP

Member of Parliament for Portage—Lisgar
- In office 1993–2000
- Preceded by: first member
- Succeeded by: Brian Pallister

Personal details
- Born: February 1, 1936 Morden, Manitoba, Canada
- Died: October 22, 2015 (aged 79) Morden, Manitoba, Canada
- Party: Reform → Independent

Jacob Edward Hoeppner (February 1, 1936 – October 22, 2015) was a Canadian politician. He served in the House of Commons of Canada from 1993 to 2000, initially with the Reform Party and later as an independent member of Parliament (MP).

== Early life ==
Hoeppner was born to a Russian Mennonite family in Morden, Manitoba, did not finish high school, and worked as a farmer for thirty-five years. Between 1968 and 1984, he served on the Snowflake School Board, the Pembina Valley School Board, and the MCI Collegiate Board (Gretna). He was also a member of the Provisional Board of Keystone Agricultural Producers, District 2 and Southern Co-op Feeders Ltd. He first became a public figure in 1971, when he opposed the provincial government's crop-insurance scheme and received twice what he was initially promised in a hailstone-damage claim.

== Political career ==
He was first elected to the House of Commons in the 1993 federal election, defeating Liberal candidate Grant Johnson by 4,655 votes in Lisgar—Marquette. Hoeppner was the only Reform MP to be elected from a Manitoba riding in this election, and was one of only two party MPs elected east of Saskatchewan.

Hoeppner launched a lawsuit against the Canadian Wheat Board in 1995, alleging that the board had charged insufficient buy-back prices to grain companies and had not properly distributed the money it received. The case was thrown out of court in 1998, and Hoeppner was ordered to pay the Wheat Board's legal fees. Hoeppner alleged that the Wheat Board withheld information from producers, though others have disputed his claims.

In 1996, he spoke out against a federal measure that extended anti-discrimination provisions to homosexuals by claiming that homosexuality was the cause of civil war in Liberia and Zambia. These comments were widely ridiculed, and Foreign Affairs Minister Lloyd Axworthy referred to Hoeppner's observations as "probably the most ultimate example of stupidity I've seen (from) a Reform MP".

He was re-elected in the 1997 election, defeating Progressive Conservative candidate Brian Pallister by 1,449 votes in the redistributed riding of Portage—Lisgar. Pallister had been a star candidate for the Progressive Conservatives, and was seen by some as the favourite to win the riding.

After the election, Hoeppner promoted the idea of running provincial Reform Party candidates in Manitoba (there had previously been an organization called the Reform Party of Manitoba, but it was not affiliated with the federal party). One independent Reformer campaigned in a 1997 provincial by-election, but the idea went no further. He considered leaving the party in 1998, but chose to stay after receiving promises that it would devote more attention to agriculture.

Hoeppner was excluded from the Reform Party caucus on July 27, 1999, after criticizing party leader Preston Manning and strategist Rick Anderson for their plans to fold Reform into the United Alternative. Hoeppner later announced his plans to challenge Manning for the United Alternative leadership, though this came to nothing. He was expelled from caucus later in the year, and changed his parliamentary designation to "Independent Reform" on September 28. On April 4, 2000, he changed his designation to "Independent". Hoepnner was accused of assaulting Reform MP Inky Mark at a meeting in September 1999, but was cleared of the charge in May 2000.

He sought re-election in November 2000 and this time finished a distant fourth against Pallister, who was now a candidate of Reform's successor party, the Canadian Alliance. Hoeppner openly used $10,500 taken from the Portage—Lisgar Canadian Alliance Association in this election, claiming that the money belonged to him. The Alliance later sued to recover the money.

== Controversy ==
Hoeppner once blamed women for inciting male violence, claiming: "As kids we were always taught at home when we went to get the cattle out of the pasture not to wear red because it would infuriate the bull".

== After politics ==
After leaving office, Hoeppner was involved with "Farmers for Justice", a conservative agrarian group seeking to reduce the powers of the Canadian Wheat Board.

Hoeppner was later skeptical about efforts to merge the Canadian Alliance with the Progressive Conservatives to form the Conservative Party of Canada He also brought a series of lawsuits against former leaders of the Reform Party, including one in 2004 for "embarrassment, damage to his reputation and humiliation" resulting from his expulsion from the party five years earlier.

== Personal life ==
Hoeppner's brother Walter has campaigned for the Manitoba Liberal Party at the provincial level.

He died on October 22, 2015.

== Electoral history ==
2000 Canadian federal election: Portage—Lisgar
Party	Candidate	Votes	%	±%	Expenditures
Alliance	Brian Pallister	17,318	50.31	+10.07	$44,417.63
Liberal	Gerry J.E. Gebler	6,133	17.82	+3.21	$44,267.57
Progressive Conservative	Morley McDonald	5,339	15.51	−20.42	$16,872.28
Independent	Jake Hoeppner	3,558	10.34		$40,395.49
New Democratic	Diane Beresford	2,073	6.02	−1.17	$3,880.73
Total valid votes		34,421	99.71		
Total rejected ballots		101	0.29	−0.15	
Turnout		34,522	61.56	+0.93	
Eligible voters		56,082	–	–	
Alliance hold		Swing		+3.43	
Sources: Official Results, Elections Canada, Official Voting Results and Financial Returns, Elections Canada.

^ Canadian Alliance results compared to Reform

1997 Canadian federal election: Portage—Lisgar
Party	Candidate	Votes	%	Expenditures
Reform	Jake Hoeppner	13,532	40.25	$55,221
Progressive Conservative	Brian Pallister	12,083	35.94	$52,473
Liberal	Heather Mack	4,913	14.61	$14,412
New Democratic	Glen Hallick	2,420	7.20	$9,391
Christian Heritage	Martin Dewit	517	1.54	$2,674
Canadian Action	Roy Lyall	159	0.47	$1,210
Total valid votes		33,624	99.56	
Total rejected ballots		149	0.44	
Turnout		33,773	60.63	
Eligible voters		55,706	–	
Sources: Official Results, Elections Canada, Official Voting Results and Financial Returns, Elections Canada.
