= David Orchard =

Canadian politician (born 1950)

Personal details
- Born: June 28, 1950 (age 76) Borden, Saskatchewan, Canada
- Party: Liberal (since 2006)
- Other political affiliations: Progressive Conservative (1998-2003)

David Orchard (born June 28, 1950) is a Canadian author and political figure, who was the Liberal Party candidate for the Saskatchewan riding of Desnethé—Missinippi—Churchill River in the 2008 federal election.

As a member of the now defunct Progressive Conservative Party of Canada (PC Party), Orchard opposed the party's merger with the Canadian Alliance to form the Conservative Party of Canada. Orchard has never held political office in Canada, but has been involved in leadership conventions and other political activities. He is perhaps best known for his campaign to oppose the Canada–United States Free Trade Agreement. Orchard has become a prominent activist against the Canada-U.S. free trade agreement arguing it would weaken Canada's sovereignty and control of its resources. He also campaigned against the North American Free Trade Agreement (NAFTA), the proposed Free Trade Area of the Americas and the proposed Multilateral Agreement on Investment (MAI).

Orchard is a fourth-generation organic grain farmer and author of the bestselling book The Fight for Canada: Four Centuries of Resistance to American Expansionism. He was also a co-founder of CCAFT (Citizens Concerned About Free Trade) in 1985.

== Early life ==
Orchard was born in Saskatoon, Saskatchewan. Educated in Borden, he went on to study arts and science and then law at the University of Saskatchewan in nearby Saskatoon, although he did not graduate. He later studied French at Quebec City's Université Laval. Orchard is the fourth-generation on his family farm on which he has farmed organically for over 30 years.

== Politics ==
Orchard sees himself as a "Red" or moderate Tory and claims to be ideologically inspired by his political idols former prime ministers John Diefenbaker, Lord Richard Bennett, Sir Robert Borden and Sir John A. Macdonald. He is passionately opposed to Canadian economic integration with the U.S., including the North American Free Trade Agreement, which he says impedes Canada's economic and cultural sovereignty. He has criticized many aspects of the United States foreign policy including wars and invasions of small nations.

Orchard supports government social programs and is a strong supporter of the environment. Orchard is a devoted monarchist and opposes a weakening of federal powers in favour of the provinces. He also supported the campaign against the Meech Lake and Charlottetown Accords, calling them "The mortal weakening of the central government". He also advocates that 3 to 5% of the Gross Domestic Product go to military spending. He is opposed to gun control. He is a social conservative, and (according to the National Post) opposes same-sex marriage, a charge he has denied.

Orchard describes his own views as being conservative in the "historical mainstream" and "centrist" of the PC party, and claimed they would appeal to moderate Canadians. Orchard's beliefs are perhaps best likened to that of the traditional, British Tory, which although historically common in Canada, lost much of their relevance since the rise of the so-called neoconservative faction. He has been shunned by many conservatives, who often accuse him of being out of step with modern conservatism and too far to the left. Such claims were common during his bids for PC leader, when he was accused being an opportunist who tried to practise entryism, and take over the Progressive Conservative Party and steer it sharply to the left and away from the conservatism of Brian Mulroney and Margaret Thatcher.

He has never been elected to the House of Commons of Canada or to any public office. As a Progressive Conservative, he sought election in the federal riding of Prince Albert, Saskatchewan in the 2000 federal election. He placed a distant fourth, although with the highest percentage vote received by a Progressive Conservative candidate in Saskatchewan since 1993. He lost in the 2008 Canadian federal election, placing second in the Saskatchewan riding of Desnethé—Missinippi—Churchill River, as the Liberal candidate.

=== 1998 Progressive Conservative leadership bid ===
Orchard ran twice for the PC leadership: in 1998 and in 2003. In his first attempt, he finished a distant second to former prime minister Joe Clark on the final ballot but attracted a very different group of supporters to the Tory party in doing so. Many of Orchard's supporters were former members of the other political parties in Canada and two of Orchard's most prominent endorsers in the leadership bid were the leaders of the Green parties of British Columbia and Ontario. During the relatively quiet race, Clark referred to Orchard as a "tourist" in the Tory party because of his left-leaning economic platform and opposition to the free trade agreements brokered by the Mulroney government. In one debate, opponent Brian Pallister quipped that "Mr. Orchard is so left-wing, he thinks Svend Robinson is a right-wing maniac."

However, Orchard did gain respect from PC circles when he chose to stick with the Tories after Clark's victory. Orchard and his political advisor, Marjaleena Repo, worked hard after his failed leadership bid to rebuild several Saskatchewan PC constituency associations and improve PC membership sales across Canada. Orchard was one of Clark's staunchest defenders during the lead-up to the August 2002 convention that saw Clark resign as Tory leader after the disintegration of the parliamentary PC-Democratic Representative Caucus coalition in May 2002.

=== 2003 Progressive Conservative leadership campaign ===
Respect for Orchard grew in the Red Tory wing of the PC Party: roughly one-quarter of the party membership supported him during the 2003 PC leadership campaign, including Joe Clark's wife, Maureen McTeer. Orchard ultimately came in third on the third ballot in the 2003 PC convention, behind Nova Scotia Member of Parliament (MP) Peter MacKay and Calgary lawyer Jim Prentice. Orchard decided to support Peter MacKay over Jim Prentice due to the latter's implicit support for a United Alternative (merger of the party with the Canadian Alliance (CA) party). However, Orchard's support, which helped Peter MacKay win the leadership, came at price. MacKay signed a written deal, or "gentleman's agreement" to seal support from Orchard's largely loyal delegates on the final ballot.

==== The MacKay-Orchard deal ====
The deal promised a review of the Canada–United States Free Trade Agreement, no joint candidates with the Canadian Alliance, and a promise to redouble efforts to rebuild the national status of the Progressive Conservative Party. The agreement also included reexamining the PC Party's policies on government subsidies for national railways and preserving the environment. This agreement was controversial, and some time passed before it was released to the public. Many in the PC Party approved of the deal, including leadership candidate Scott Brison.

At first MacKay had seemed to be willing to adhere to the deal. In July, MacKay struck up a "Blue Ribbon PC Policy Review Panel", chaired by Tory MP Bill Casey, in order to reexamine the party's policies on NAFTA.

However, before the Panel could meet, MacKay encouraged talks between high-profile members of the Canadian Alliance and the Progressive Conservatives. In October 2003, the talks culminated in MacKay and Stephen Harper, leader of the Canadian Alliance, signing an agreement in principle to merge the Progressive Conservatives and the Canadian Alliance to form the new Conservative Party of Canada.

=== Anti-merger activist ===
Orchard unsuccessfully attempted to prevent the merger. In a high-profile news conference in early November he suggested that the new Conservative Party of Canada was "an abomination, conceived in deception, born in betrayal." He urged PC Party members to vote "no" on any referendum and also encouraged "loyal members" to express their frustrations with Peter MacKay. Orchard argued that his efforts were not based on self-promotion but rather on preserving Canada's founding party and preventing a takeover of the moderate values and membership of the PCs by the neoconservative values of the Alliance membership.

Orchard opposed the right wing, and in his view slavishly pro-U.S. views of the Canadian Alliance. Orchard argued that before the merger was announced, the Canadian Alliance and its leader, Stephen Harper, were highly unpopular and a moment was fast approaching for the PCs to reemerge as the national alternative to the governing Liberals. Orchard suggested that MacKay's "traitorous" actions put the above scenario in jeopardy. Some other notable Tories such as Joe Clark, Flora MacDonald, Brian Peckford and Sinclair Stevens also opposed the merger.

In a last-ditch attempt to stop the merger, Orchard went to court, seeking an injunction against the merger vote. The case was thrown out of court on the grounds that a merger through a "national convention" did not violate the PC Party constitution. The merger was ratified with 96% support by members of the Canadian Alliance in a one-member-one-vote process on December 5. The PC Party opted for a "virtual convention" in which delegates were selected in ridings and then attended local provincial urban centres in which they voted for or against the merger.

Orchard described the process as fraudulent and undemocratic, as the convention delegates never actually voted together in any fixed location. The convention produced a result in which 90.5% of the Progressive Conservative Party delegates voted in favour of the merger. However, Orchard and other opponents claimed the result was not representative of the true PC membership, pointing out that new memberships in the party were sold almost up to the day of the vote, many of which were card holders of the larger Canadian Alliance and the PC members were being swamped.

Many analysts have suggested that Orchard's battle to preserve the PC Party may have been vigorous but ultimately pointless. By the time the agreement in principle was formalized in October, the fate of the PC Party may have been practically sealed. Orchard himself had commented as early as September that the party's preparations for a widely expected 2004 federal election were in disarray. Since becoming leader, MacKay and the party's ruling council had done little to facilitate election readiness and preparation which may have been an early signal of MacKay's intentions to not run a full slate of 308 PC candidates in the expected election.

Orchard also faced speculation from some opponents and journalists in regard to his motivations to preserve the Progressive Conservative political name brand. Some critics suggested that he was really attempting to undermine Peter MacKay's merger stance in order to force a resignation and prompt another leadership race, allowing for a "takeover" by Orchard and his supporters.

==== Aftermath ====
Now Orchard was (by virtue of having membership in the now-defunct PC party) an unhappy member of the Conservative Party. Shortly before the Conservative Party's March 2005 policy convention, Orchard had his renewed membership revoked by the party and was denied access to the event. "The council decided that it was in the interests of the party that they didn't want him to be a member of the party any longer," said Ian Brodie, the executive director of the Conservative Party.

In February 2004, he was asked to take over the leadership of the struggling Canadian Action Party after the resignation of its leader, Paul Hellyer, but Orchard declined. There were also rumours that Orchard was in discussions over a future Saskatchewan rural riding candidacy for the Saskatchewan Party, and Orchard's name was frequently touted as a possible future leadership contender for the Green Party of Canada.

On January 31, 2006, a Toronto judge ordered the Conservative Party of Canada to pay Orchard $70,000, the funds from his 2003 leadership campaign which he had been owed since then. The CPC had previously insisted on Orchard's signing a pledge not to sue Peter MacKay over issues resulting from the agreement signed at the 2003 PC Leadership Convention in order to settle the affair, which Orchard refused to do.

Orchard continues to write for major newspapers, present lectures in Canada's universities on foreign policy and environmental issues, and continues working in the organic farming business.

=== Liberal Party ===
On November 19, 2005, CBC Radio News reported that the Liberals were trying to recruit Orchard as a candidate in the 2006 federal election. According to the report, Orchard would be a Liberal candidate in either Saskatchewan or rural Ontario. Orchard did not run as a Liberal in the 2006 federal election but he announced his support for the Liberals and campaigned for Chris Axworthy in Saskatchewan, Yves Picard and Isa Gros-Louis in Quebec City, and Susan Whelan in Ontario. Orchard also officially became a member of the Liberal Party of Canada during the 2006 election.

After the Liberals were defeated, and leader Paul Martin stepped down, there was some media speculation that Orchard would seek the Liberal Party leadership. Instead, on August 17, 2006 Orchard endorsed Stéphane Dion to be the next leader of the federal Liberal Party. At the 2006 leadership convention, Orchard led a group of approximately 150 delegates, including 32 from Saskatchewan, in support of Dion. Those delegates ended up being pivotal in helping Dion pass Gerard Kennedy for third place on the first convention ballot, and eventually win the leadership when Kennedy swung his own support behind Dion after the second ballot.

Subsequently, Orchard declared that he would be seeking the nomination in the Saskatchewan riding of Desnethé—Missinippi—Churchill River as a Liberal candidate in the forthcoming by-election in that riding. Again, however, Orchard's ambitions created political controversy. Orchard's nomination fight was ultimately terminated on January 3, 2008 when Dion announced via a news release that Joan Beatty would be appointed as the candidate for that riding, a decision that was the subject of some controversy.

Métis leader Jim Durocher, an Orchard supporter, wrote a letter to Dion complaining about his decision to appoint a candidate rather than allow for party members to vote in a nomination meeting. He argued that "the people of this riding resent, and I personally resent mightily, the attitude of certain southerners that they know what's best for our riding." Durocher, a former Liberal candidate, also told Dion "If you impose Joan Beatty, the Liberals will lose this riding."

National Liberal campaign co-chair David Smith, however, defended Beatty's appointment by saying that Dion had made getting more women into politics a priority, saying that the party is "prepared to bite the bullet to demonstrate that our commitment to increasing our number of women candidates – particularly well-qualified ones – is very real." The media also reported that Liberal party House Leader and Saskatchewan MP Ralph Goodale, a former finance minister, was opposed to Orchard's candidacy in the by-election.

Beatty lost the ensuing byelection to Conservative candidate Rob Clarke. On August 14, it was reported that Orchard would challenge Beatty for the Liberal nomination in Desnethé—Missinippi—Churchill River for the 2008 federal election. Orchard won the nomination, but placed second in the election, losing to Clarke by 3,148 votes.

== Electoral record ==
2008 Canadian federal election: Desnethé—Missinippi—Churchill River
Party	Candidate	Votes	%	±%	Expenditures
Conservative	Rob Clarke	8,964	46.67	-1.16	$81,066
Liberal	David Orchard	5,816	30.28	-1.30	$88,314
New Democratic	Brian Morin	3,414	17.77	+0.24	$1,459
Green	George Morin	733	3.82	+0.75	$1,387
First Peoples National	Rob Ballantyne	282	1.47	–	–
Total valid votes/expense limit		19,209	100.00		$90,390
Total rejected ballots		105	0.54	+0.19	
Turnout		19,314	44.75	+20.03	
Conservative hold		Swing		-1.1	

2000 Canadian federal election: Prince Albert
Party	Candidate	Votes	%	±%	Expenditures
Alliance	Brian Fitzpatrick	14,825	45.6	+7.5	$58,048
Liberal	Tim Longworth	6,754	20.8	-0.4	$46,856
New Democratic	Dennis Nowoselsky	6,676	20.5	-11.2	$49,523
Progressive Conservative	David Orchard	3,943	12.1	+3.9	$63,282
Green	Benjamin Webster	317	1.0	–	$20
Total valid votes		32,515	100.0		–
Total rejected ballots		83	0.23		
Turnout		32,598	64.1	-0.4	

Note: Canadian Alliance vote is compared to the Reform vote in 1997 election.
