= Progressive Conservative Party of Canada leadership elections =

The first Progressive Conservative Party of Canada leadership election was held in 1927, when the party was called the Conservative Party. Prior to then the party's leader was chosen by the caucus or in several cases by the Governor General of Canada designating a Conservative MP or Senator to form a government after the retirement or death of an incumbent Conservative Prime Minister.

There have been two permanent leaders since 1927 who were not chosen by a leadership convention. Arthur Meighen agreed to serve a second term as leader in 1941 on condition that he would not have to contest the position. The party agreed since the party was desperate for a leader of Meighen's stature. Jean Charest was one of only two Progressive Conservative Members of Parliament returned in the 1993 election and was appointed leader by the party's executive with the decision later being affirmed at a regular party convention two years later. The Conservative Party became the Progressive Conservative Party in 1942.

All leadership conventions were delegated conventions, except in 1998 when a one member, one vote process was used in which each riding was allocated 100 points which were distributed among candidates by proportionally. For the 2003 leadership election, the party reverted to use of a delegated convention, ostensibly because of the cost of using a one-member, one vote process (though it has been argued that the party feared that use of one member, one vote would make an outside takeover of the party easier due to a decline in membership). In 2003, the party merged with the Canadian Alliance to form a new Conservative Party of Canada. This party adopted the one member, one vote process the Tories had used in 1998.

Note on tables: Green box indicates winner. Pink box indicates candidate eliminated from ballot for receiving the fewest votes. Blue box indicates candidate withdrew from balloting.

== 1927 Conservative leadership convention ==
Held in Winnipeg, Manitoba on October 11, 1927.

Delegate support by ballot
Candidate	1st ballot		2nd ballot	
Candidate	Votes cast	%	Votes cast	%
R. B. Bennett	594	38.0%	780	50.2%
Hugh Guthrie	345	22.0%	320	20.6%
Charles Cahan	310	19.8%	266	17.1%
Robert James Manion	170	10.9%	148	9.5%
Robert Rogers	114	7.3%	37	2.4%
Henry Lumley Drayton	31	2.0%	3	0.2%
Total	1,564	100.0%	1,554	100.0%

George Halsey Perley, H. H. Stevens, John Allister Currie, John Baxter, Howard Ferguson, Edgar Nelson Rhodes, and outgoing leader Arthur Meighen were all nominated but declined to run.

== 1938 Conservative leadership convention ==
Held in Ottawa, Ontario on July 7, 1938.

Delegate support by ballot
Candidate	1st ballot		2nd ballot	
Candidate	Votes cast	%	Votes cast	%
Robert James Manion	726	46.4%	830	53.0%
M. A. MacPherson	475	30.3%	648	41.4%
Joseph Henry Harris	131	8.4%	49	3.1%
Denton Massey	128	8.2%	39	2.5%
Earl Lawson	105	6.7%	Eliminated	
Total	1,565	100.0%	1,566	100.0%

Manion lost his seat in the 1940 federal election and R.B. Hanson became interim leader. In November 1941 a national conference of the party voted against having a leadership convention and instead appointed Arthur Meighen as the party's wartime leader. Meighen was defeated in a 1942 by-election and resigned.

== 1942 Progressive Conservative leadership convention ==
Held in Winnipeg, Manitoba on December 11, 1942.

Delegate support by ballot
Candidate	1st ballot		2nd ballot	
Candidate	Votes cast	%	Votes cast	%
John Bracken	420	48.3%	538	61.7%
M. A. MacPherson	222	25.5%	255	29.2%
John Diefenbaker	120	13.8%	79	9.1%
Howard Charles Green	88	10.1%	Withdrew	
Henry Hubert Stevens	20	2.3%	Eliminated	
Total	870	100.0%	872	100.0%

== 1948 Progressive Conservative leadership convention ==
Held in Ottawa, Ontario on October 2, 1948.

First Ballot
Candidate	Delegate Count	Percentage
George A. Drew	827	66.6%
John Diefenbaker	311	25.0%
Donald Fleming	104	8.4%
Total	1,242	100%

Wilfrid Garfield Case announced his candidacy but withdrew before the convention to support Drew.

== 1956 Progressive Conservative leadership convention ==
Held in Ottawa, Ontario on December 14, 1956.

First Ballot
Candidate	Delegate Count	Percentage
John Diefenbaker	774	60.3%
Donald Fleming	393	30.6%
Davie Fulton	117	9.1%
Total	1,284	100%

== 1967 Progressive Conservative leadership convention ==
The 1967 leadership convention was held in Toronto, Ontario on September 9, 1967.

Delegate support by ballot
Candidate	1st ballot		2nd ballot		3rd ballot		4th ballot		5th ballot	
Candidate	Votes cast	%	Votes cast	%	Votes cast	%	Votes cast	%	Votes cast	%
Robert Stanfield	519	23.3%	613	27.7%	717	32.7%	865	40.1%	1,150	54.3%
Dufferin Roblin	347	15.6%	430	19.4%	541	24.7%	771	35.7%	969	45.7%
Davie Fulton	343	15.4%	346	15.7%	361	16.5%	357	16.5%	Endorsed Stanfield	
George Hees	295	13.2%	299	13.5%	277	12.6%	Endorsed Stanfield			
John Diefenbaker	271	12.2%	172	7.8%	114	5.2%	Endorsed Roblin			
Wallace McCutcheon	137	6.1%	76	3.4%	Endorsed Stanfield					
Alvin Hamilton	136	6.1%	127	5.8%	106	4.8%	167	7.7%	Did not endorse	
Donald Fleming	126	5.7%	115	5.2%	76	3.5%	Endorsed Stanfield			
Michael Starr	45	2.0%	34	1.5%	Did not endorse					
John MacLean	10	0.4%	Withdrew because he did not want the convention “to go too late”							
Mary Walker-Sawka	2	-	Did not endorse							
Total	2,231	100.0%	2,212	100.0%	2,192	100.0%	2,160	100.0%	2,119	100.0%

== 1976 Progressive Conservative leadership convention ==
The 1976 leadership convention was held in Ottawa, Ontario on February 22, 1976.

Delegate support by ballot
Candidate	1st ballot		2nd ballot		3rd ballot		4th ballot	
Candidate	Votes cast	%	Votes cast	%	Votes cast	%	Votes cast	%
Claude Wagner	531	22.5%	667	28.5%	1,003	42.8%	1,122	48.6%
Brian Mulroney	357	15.1%	419	17.9%	369	15.8%	Did not endorse	
Joe Clark	277	11.7%	532	22.8%	969	41.4%	1,187	51.4%
Jack Horner	235	10.0%	286	12.2%	Endorsed Wagner			
Flora MacDonald	214	9.1%	239	10.2%	Endorsed Clark			
Paul Hellyer	231	9.8%	118	5.1%	Endorsed Wagner			
Sinclair Stevens	182	7.7%	Endorsed Clark					
John Allen Fraser	127	5.4%	34	1.5%	Endorsed Clark			
James Gillies	87	3.7%	Endorsed Clark					
Pat Nowlan	86	3.6%	42	1.8%	Endorsed Wagner			
Heward Grafftey	33	1.4%	Endorsed Clark					
Total	2,360	100.0%	2,337	100.0%	2,341	100.0%	2,309	100.0%

Richard Quittenton withdrew from the race before the convention began.

== 1983 Progressive Conservative leadership convention ==
The 1983 leadership convention was held in Ottawa, Ontario on June 11, 1983.

Delegate support by ballot
Candidate	1st ballot		2nd ballot		3rd ballot		4th ballot	
Candidate	Votes cast	%	Votes cast	%	Votes cast	%	Votes cast	%
Joe Clark	1,091	36.5%	1,085	36.7%	1,058	35.8%	1,325	45.6%
Brian Mulroney	874	29.2%	1,021	34.6%	1,036	35.1%	1,584	54.5%
John Crosbie	639	21.4%	781	26.4%	858	29.1%	Did not endorse	
David Crombie	116	3.9%	67	2.3%	Endorsed Crosbie			
Michael Wilson	144	4.8%	Endorsed Mulroney					
Peter Pocklington	102	3.4%	Endorsed Mulroney					
John A. Gamble	17	0.6%	Endorsed Mulroney					
Neil Fraser	5	0.2%	Endorsed Mulroney					
Total	2,988	100.0%	2,954	100.0%	2,952	100.0%	2,909	100.0%

== 1993 leadership convention results ==
The 1993 leadership convention was held in Ottawa, Ontario on June 13, 1993.

Delegate support by ballot
Candidate	1st ballot		2nd ballot	
Candidate	Votes cast	%	Votes cast	%
Kim Campbell	1,664	48.0%	1,817	52.7%
Jean Charest	1,369	39.4%	1,630	47.3%
Jim Edwards	307	8.9%	Endorsed Campbell	
Garth Turner	76	2.2%	Did not endorse	
Patrick Boyer	53	1.5%	Endorsed Charest	
Total	3,469	100.0%	3,447	100.0%

== 1995 Progressive Conservative leadership convention ==
The 1995 leadership convention was held at the Palais des congrès de Gatineau in Hull, Quebec on April 29, 1995, to ratify Jean Charest as leader. Charest had been named interim leader following the 1993 federal election (and Kim Campbell's resignation as party leader), which reduced the Progressive Conservatives to only two seats, with Charest being the only cabinet minister to win re-election.

Vote to ratify Jean Charest as leader
Candidate	Yes		No	
Candidate	Delegate Count	%	Delegate Count	%
Jean Charest	1,187	96.04%	49	3.96%
Total	1,236			

== 1998 Progressive Conservative leadership election ==
First ballot was conducted October 24, 1998; second ballot was conducted November 14, 1998.

The 1998 election used a point system that allocated 100 points to each riding, regardless of the number of votes cast in the riding. The candidate who won a majority of points (not necessarily a majority of voters) would win the leadership. All party members were eligible to cast a vote. The 100-point-per-riding system was again used by the Conservative Party of Canada in its 2004 leadership race.

Points by ballot
Candidate	First Ballot October 24		Second Ballot November 14	
Candidate	Points	%	Points	%
Joe Clark	14,592	48.5%	23,321	77.5%
Hugh Segal	5,689	18.9%	Endorsed Clark	
David Orchard	4,916	16.3%	6,779	22.5%
Brian Pallister	3,676	12.2%	Endorsed Clark	
Michael Fortier	1,227	4.1%	Endorsed Clark	
Total	30,100	100.0%	30,100	100.0%

== 2003 Progressive Conservative leadership convention ==
The 2003 leadership convention was held in Toronto, Ontario on May 31, 2003.

Delegate support by ballot
Candidate	1st ballot		2nd ballot		3rd ballot		4th ballot	
Candidate	Votes cast	%	Votes cast	%	Votes cast	%	Votes cast	%
Peter MacKay	1,080	41.1%	1,018	39.7%	1,128	45.0%	1,538	64.8%
David Orchard	640	24.3%	619	24.1%	617	24.6%	Endorsed MacKay	
Jim Prentice	478	18.2%	466	18.2%	761	30.4%	836	35.2%
Scott Brison	431	16.4%	463	18.0%	Endorsed Prentice			
Craig Chandler	0	—	Withdrew before 1st ballot began; Endorsed Prentice					
Total	2,629	100.0%	2,566	100.0%	2,506	100.0%	2,374	100.0%

Two other candidates had participated in the race. Quebec MP André Bachand withdrew his candidacy from the race due to financial concerns and backed Peter MacKay. Former Cabinet Minister and Quebec MP Heward Grafftey also withdrew his candidacy from the race due to health concerns.

== See also ==
- Conservative Party of Canada leadership elections
