= Hugh Segal =

Canadian politician (1950–2023)

The Honourable Hugh David Segal OC OOnt CD
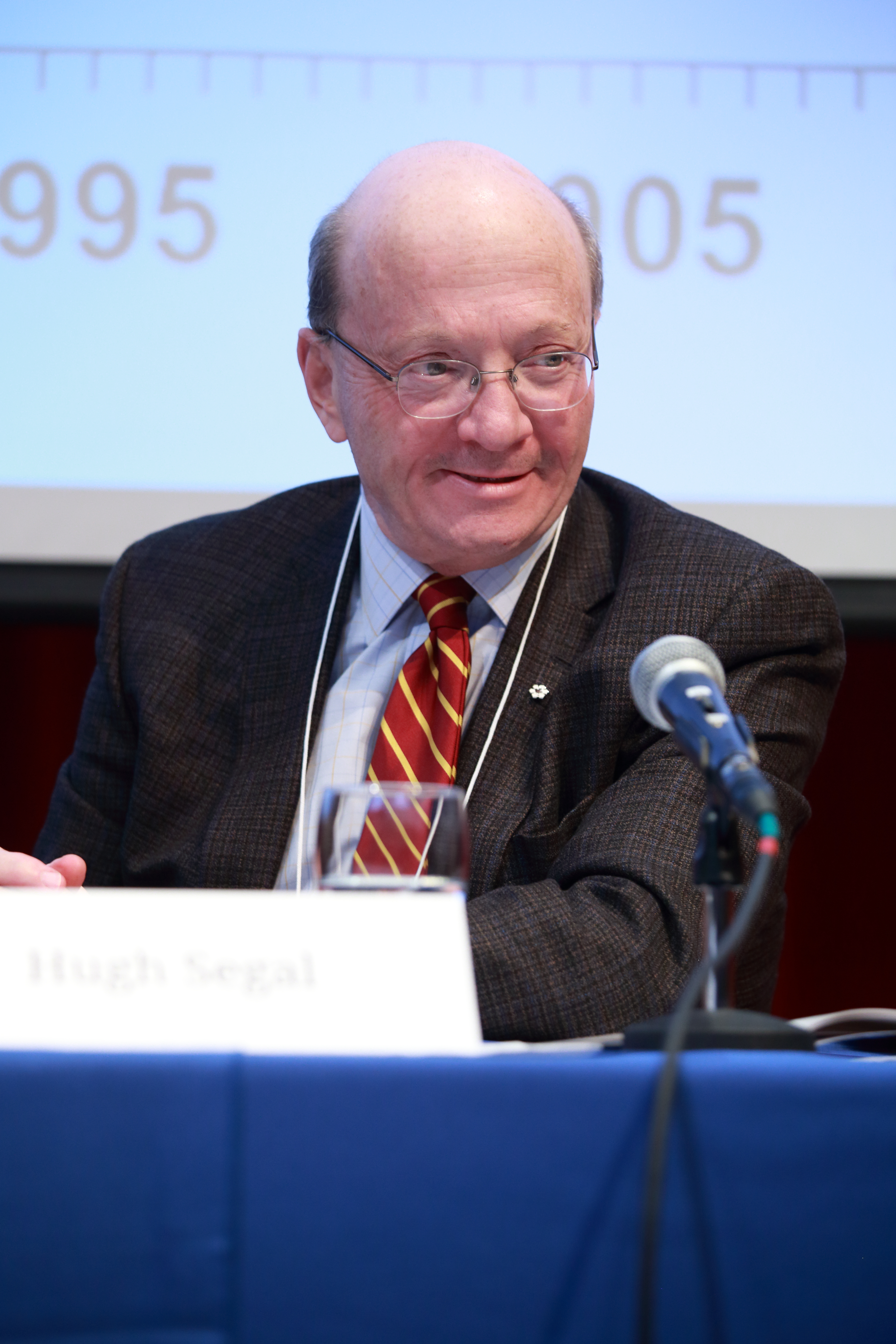

5th Principal of Massey College
- In office July 1, 2014 – June 30, 2019
- Preceded by: John Fraser
- Succeeded by: Nathalie Des Rosiers

Canadian Senator from Ontario
- In office August 2, 2005 – June 15, 2014
- Appointed by: Paul Martin

4th Chief of Staff to the Prime Minister
- In office April 14, 1992 – June 25, 1993
- Prime Minister: Brian Mulroney
- Preceded by: Norman Spector
- Succeeded by: David McLaughlin

Personal details
- Born: October 13, 1950 Montreal, Quebec, Canada
- Died: August 9, 2023 (aged 72) Kingston, Ontario, Canada
- Party: Progressive Conservative
- Education: University of Ottawa

Hugh Segal (October 13, 1950 – August 9, 2023) was a Canadian political strategist, author, commentator, academic, and senator. He served as chief of staff to Ontario premier Bill Davis and later to Canadian prime minister Brian Mulroney. Segal resigned from the Senate of Canada on June 15, 2014, as a result of his appointment as master (later principal) of Massey College in Toronto.

== Career ==
=== Politics and public policy ===
Segal was inspired by a visit from Prime Minister John Diefenbaker in 1962 to his school, United Talmud Torah Academy in Montreal. Segal went on to graduate from the University of Ottawa and was an aide to federal Progressive Conservative Leader of the Opposition Robert Stanfield in the early 1970s, while still a university student. He served as President of the Student Federation of the University of Ottawa from 1970-1971.

At the age of 21, he was an unsuccessful Progressive Conservative candidate in Ottawa Centre for the House of Commons of Canada in the 1972 general election. He was defeated again in 1974.

As a member of the Big Blue Machine, Segal was a senior aide to Ontario Progressive Conservative Premier Bill Davis in the 1970s and 1980s, and he was named Deputy Minister at age 29. From 1992 to 1993, he was Chief of Staff to Prime Minister Brian Mulroney.

Segal finished second to Joe Clark after the first ballot of the 1998 Progressive Conservative leadership election, but he chose to withdraw and support Clark (the eventual winner) in the second ballot runoff vote against third-place finisher David Orchard. He had also briefly considered running for the Progressive Conservative leadership in 1993.

==== Senate ====
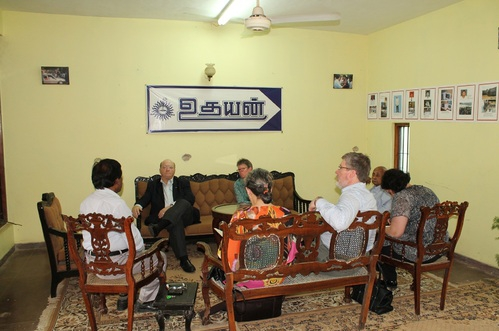
Senator Hugh Segal, Canadian High Commissioner in Sri Lanka Shellie Viding and other delegates met E. Saravanapavan at the Uthayan newspaper premises in Jaffna, 2013

In 2005, Segal was appointed to the Senate of Canada by Liberal Prime Minister Paul Martin. He was the chairman of the Senate Foreign Affairs Committee until he "reluctantly" agreed to resign in 2007 at the request of the Conservative government, which reportedly wished to appoint a more ideologically conservative senator to the role after the committee issued a report critical of the Conservative government's foreign aid policy. Segal insisted, however, that the move was an administrative one. Segal later served as Chair of the Special Senate Committee on Anti-Terrorism.

In December 2013, Segal announced his intention to resign from the Senate in June 2014, twelve years before he would reach the mandatory retirement age of 75, to accept an academic appointment as Master of Massey College in Toronto.

==== Commonwealth ====
On July 7, 2010, Segal was appointed to the Commonwealth Eminent Persons Group (EPG) by Secretary General Kamalesh Sharma. The group's mandate is to set out recommendations on how to strengthen the Commonwealth and fulfill its potential in the 21st century. In December 2011, the federal government appointed him special envoy to the Commonwealth with the task of convincing individual countries to sign on to the EPG's 106 recommendations.

==== Political views ====
Segal espoused a moderate brand of conservatism that has little in common with British Thatcherism or US neoconservatism. He was a Red Tory in the tradition of Benjamin Disraeli, Sir John A. Macdonald, John Diefenbaker and his mentors Robert Stanfield and Bill Davis. This political philosophy stresses the common good and promotes social harmony between classes. It is often associated with One Nation Conservatism. The focus is on order, good government and mutual responsibility. Individual rights and personal freedom are not considered absolute. In his 1997 book Beyond Greed: A Traditional Conservative Confronts Neo-Conservative Excess, Segal sought to distinguish what he called "traditional" conservatives from neo-conservatives, notably those in the United States.

In an earlier book, his 1996 memoir No Surrender (page 225), Segal wrote: "Progressive Conservatives cannot embrace the nihilistic defeatism that masquerades as a neo-conservative polemic in support of individual freedom and disengagement." He went on to deplore "American fast-food conservatism." In a speech to the National Press Club on June 21, 1995, Segal referred to the "selfish and directionless nature of the American revolution -- which was more about self-interest, mercantile opportunity, and who collected what tax than it was about tolerance or freedom."

Segal opposed on civil liberties grounds the imposition of the War Measures Act by Prime Minister Pierre Trudeau in the October Crisis of 1970. He favoured strengthening Canada's military and encouraging investment while maintaining a strong social safety net. His 1998 proposal to reduce Canada's Goods and Services Tax from 7% to 6% (and then 5%) was adopted by Stephen Harper and the Conservative Party in 2005. During his leadership campaign, he stated his support for capital punishment.

On June 6, 2012, Segal had a comment published in the National Post outlining his views on Basic Income. In December 2012, Segal published an essay in the Literary Review of Canada promoting the benefits of a guaranteed annual income.

=== Journalism ===
In the 1980s and 1990s, Segal became a television pundit and newspaper columnist. In the private sector, Segal has been an executive in the advertising, brewing, and financial services industries.

=== Academic work ===
Segal lived in Kingston, Ontario, and until 2014 was a faculty member at Queen's University's School of Policy Studies, and has also taught at the university's school of business. He served as president of the Institute for Research on Public Policy, a Montreal think tank, from 1999 to 2006. He sat on the board of directors and was a distinguished fellow at the Canadian Defence and Foreign Affairs Institute. He was also a member of the Trilateral Commission.

Segal was appointed Master of Massey College in the University of Toronto (effective at the end of June 2014) and retired from the Senate to accept the position. He retired from the Massey College position effective June 30, 2019, five years into his seven-year term, and was succeeded by Nathalie Des Rosiers.

== Personal life ==
Segal was born in Montreal into what he described as a "very low-end, working-class family in what is now called Le Plateau". However richer relatives ensured that he and his brothers received a good education. He was Jewish.

He was the brother of corporate executive and former university administrator Brian Segal, and of artist Seymour Segal. He was married to Donna Armstrong Segal, a former Ontario Ministry of Health executive. They had one daughter, Jacqueline.

== Death ==
Segal died on August 9, 2023, in Kingston, Ontario, at the age of 72.

== Honours ==
- In 2003, Segal was made a Member of the Order of Canada which was later promoted to the grade of Officer. *Segal held an honorary doctorate from the Royal Military College of Canada, University of Ottawa and Queen's University.
- Although he never served in the Canadian Forces, in 2004 Segal was named as an honorary captain in the Royal Canadian Navy. As a result of that honorary appointment, he was given the Canadian Forces' Decoration in 2017.
- He was made chair of the NATO Association of Canada in 2013.
- In 2013, Segal was honoured with a Peace Patron Award by The Mosaic Institute, an NGO based in Toronto working to promote pluralism reducing conflict in Canada and abroad.
- In 2016, he was made a member of the Order of Ontario.

== Electoral record ==
1998 Progressive Conservative Party of Canada leadership election

Points by ballot
Candidate	First Ballot October 24		Second Ballot November 14	
Candidate	Points	%	Points	%
CLARK, Charles Joseph (Joe)	14,592	48.5%	23,321	77.5%
SEGAL, Hugh	5,689	18.9%	Endorsed Clark	
ORCHARD, David	4,916	16.3%	6,779	22.5%
PALLISTER, Brian William	3,676	12.2%	Endorsed Clark	
FORTIER, Michael M.	1,227	4.1%	Endorsed Clark	
Total	30,100	100.0%	30,100	100.0%

1974 Canadian federal election - Ottawa Centre

1974 Canadian federal election
Party	Candidate	Votes	%	±%
Liberal	Hugh Poulin	15,308	43.33	+4.81
Progressive Conservative	Hugh Segal	12,138	34.36	-0.87
New Democratic	Irving Greenberg	6,739	19.08	-6.04
Independent	Bela Egyed	877	2.48	
Social Credit	John Graham	139	0.39	-0.26
Independent	Ray Quann	63	0.18	
Marxist–Leninist	Phil Sarazen	62	0.18	
Total valid votes		35,326	100.00	

1972 Canadian federal election - Ottawa Centre

1972 Canadian federal election
Party	Candidate	Votes	%	±%
Liberal	Hugh Poulin	14,101	38.52	-19.22
Progressive Conservative	Hugh Segal	12,899	35.23	+1.01
New Democratic	Irving Greenberg	9,195	25.12	+17.07
Social Credit	Rocco Zavarella	237	0.65	
Independent	Paul Herman	177	0.48	
Total valid votes		36,609	100.00	

== Publications ==
- Segal, Hugh (November 1, 2019). Bootstraps Need Boots: One Tory's Lonely Fight to End Poverty in Canada. On Point Press. ISBN 978-0774890458.
- Segal, Hugh (April 23, 2016). Two Freedoms: Canada's Global Future. Dundurn Press. ISBN 978-1459734456.
- Segal, Hugh (January 31, 2011). The Right Balance: Canada's Conservative Tradition. Douglas & McIntyre. ISBN 978-1553655497.
- Segal, Hugh (November 7, 2006). The Long Road Back: The Conservative Journey, 1993-2006. HarperCollins Publishers. ISBN 978-0002006132.
- Segal, Hugh (March 18, 2005). Geopolitical Integrity. Institute for Research on Public Policy. ISBN 978-0886451899
- Segal, Hugh (2000). In defence of civility: Reflections of a recovering politician. Stoddart Publishing. ISBN 978-0773732308
- Segal, Hugh (1997). Beyond greed: a traditional conservative confronts neoconservative excess. Stoddart Publishing. ISBN 978-0773730533.
- Segal, Hugh (1996). No Surrender: Reflections of a Tory Warrior. HarperCollins Canada. ISBN 978-0002553216.

Parliament of Canada
Preceded by Isobel Finnerty, Liberal	Senator from Ontario; 2005–2014	Succeeded by Vacant
Political offices
Preceded by Norman Spector	Chief of Staff of the Prime Minister's Office; 1992–1993	Succeeded by David McLaughlin
Academic offices
Preceded by John Fraser	Principal of Massey College; 2014–2019	Succeeded by Nathalie Des Rosiers
Non-profit organization positions
Preceded by Monique Jérôme-Forget	President of the Institute for Research on Public Policy; 1999–2006	Succeeded by Mel Cappe
