= Conservative Party of Quebec leadership elections =

This page lists the results of leadership elections held by the many iterations of a "Conservative Party" in Quebec.

== Conservative Party of Quebec (1867-1936) ==
Prior to 1929, leaders were chosen by the caucus.

=== 1929 leadership convention ===
(Held on July 10, 1929)

- Camillien Houde acclaimed

=== 1933 leadership convention ===
(Held on October 4, 1933)

- Maurice Duplessis 334
- Onésime Gagnon 216

The Union Nationale (UN) was formed at a caucus of Conservative Party of Quebec and Action libérale nationale MLAs on June 20, 1936. Conservative leader Maurice Duplessis was chosen leader of this new party. After 1936, see Union Nationale leadership elections

== Conservative Party of Quebec (2009-present) ==
=== 2013 leadership convention ===
(Held on February 23, 2013)

- Adrien Pouliot (acclaimed)

=== 2021 leadership convention ===
(Held on April 17, 2021)

Results
Candidate
| Candidate | Votes cast | % |
|---|---|---|
| Éric Duhaime | 9,773 | 95.99% |
| Daniel Brisson | 408 | 4.01% |
| Rejected/Spoiled Ballots | 2 | 0.0002% |
| Total | 10,813 | 100.00 |

== See also ==
- Leadership convention
