= Unite the Right (Canada) =

Mid-1990s to 2003 Canadian movement to unite right-of-center parties

The Unite the Right (French: Unir la Droite) movement was a Canadian political movement which existed from around the mid-1990s to 2003. The movement came into being when it became clear that neither of Canada's two main right-of-centre political parties, the Reform Party of Canada/Canadian Alliance (CA) and the Progressive Conservative Party of Canada (PC), was independently capable of defeating the governing Liberal Party. The objective of the movement, therefore, was to merge the two parties into a single party (or, if this was not possible, to find a power-sharing arrangement between the two parties). The goal of uniting the right was accomplished in December 2003 with the formation of the Conservative Party of Canada.

== 1980–1984: Eventual Liberal distaste ==
The Liberals, under returning prime minister Pierre Trudeau, had just secured a majority in the 1980 federal election, over incumbent Joe Clark. In Trudeau's first year back as prime minister, he implemented the NEP (National Energy Program). This policy was primarily designed to increase ownership of Canadian oil by Canadians, and to balance the pricing of oil and energy products equally nationwide. Its secondary purposes were to promote renewable energy and increase tax revenue in the western provinces.

However, Alberta (led by the PC government of Peter Lougheed) strongly opposed the NEP. They believed it interfered with the jurisdiction of the province, and deprived Alberta of its tax revenue. Fiscal conservatives (like the PC's, and eventual Reform Party members, supporters, and voters) attribute to the NEP the rising unemployment rate, bankruptcy rate, and large-scale economic deficit. The term "Western alienation" was coined as a result of the NEP’s purported negative economic effects on Alberta and bias towards Eastern Canada. Four years later, Progressive Conservative party leader Brian Mulroney achieved a victory in the 1984 federal election and immediately reverse the policy.

== 1987–1993: Fragmentation on the political right ==
The Reform Party came into being in 1987, due in part to opposition to Prime Minister Brian Mulroney's Progressive Conservative government that ruled Canada from 1984 to 1993. A significant number of Western Canadians had strongly disliked what they perceived as the Mulroney government's pro-Quebec approach and rampant use of patronage. They also viewed the Meech Lake Accord and Charlottetown Accord as not in the West's best interests. Other Western conservatives felt that Mulroney's government was not sufficiently neo-liberal in its fiscal taxation and federal spending policies while some social conservatives were critical of the government's failed attempts to regulate and reduce abortion in Canada.

In the 1993 election, the upstart Reform Party won 52 seats in the west, and the once-powerful PCs led by newly minted Prime Minister Kim Campbell were reduced to only two seats in Parliament. Both parties were, however, almost completely shut out of Ontario and Quebec in this election, and also in the elections of 1997 and 2000. The two central Canadian provinces together represented over half the seats in the House of Commons; in the 1993, 1997 and 2000 elections, the total number of central Canadian seats held, collectively, by the Reform Party/Canadian Alliance and the PCs never rose above six, out of a total of over 170 available seats.

With two right-wing parties competing for power, it became apparent that unseating the governing Liberals would be next to impossible. In the 1997 election, both the PCs and the Reform Party respectively polled roughly 19% each in popular support. The Reform party emerged with 60 Western seats and Official Opposition status, while the demoralized PCs emerged from the brink of oblivion with 20 eastern seats, and regained official party status. More importantly, the Liberals emerged with only a five-seat majority in the election, and many pundits suggested that the combined PC and Reform votes would have been enough to unseat the Liberals, or at least reduce them to minority status.

The Liberals under Jean Chrétien had governed Canada since 1993, and were never threatened by the divided right during the Chrétien era. Especially important in the Liberals' electoral success was the province of Ontario, in which the Liberals utterly dominated Canada's most populous province. Both Reform and the PC Party received many votes, but because of the first past the post (FPTP) system, this was not enough to win more than a handful of Ontario's approximately 103 seats. At the same time, the Progressive Conservative Party of Ontario, who some suggested were kindred spirits in policy and direction to Reform and Blue Tory PCs, had formed a provincial government under Premier Mike Harris.

== Barriers to a merger ==
There were many barriers to a merger. Polls had found that two-thirds of traditional PC voters would vote for the Liberals before endorsing a united Canadian Alliance/PC party. Some Westerners also had deep concerns that the new party would be dominated by Central Canada, much as they thought the Progressive Conservatives had been. Leadership and MPs from both sides of the division also opposed a merger out of concerns that both parties were distinct political entities, and not part of a larger conservative movement.

== 1995–1996: Early efforts to unite the right ==
During the 1995 Quebec referendum, Reform leader Preston Manning implored the two sitting PC MPs, Elsie Wayne and party leader Jean Charest, to sit in Parliament with the Reform Party caucus. The combined weight of 52 Reform MPs and two PC MPs would have allowed their proposed and unified caucus to replace the 53-member separatist Bloc Québécois caucus as Her Majesty's Loyal Opposition. Charest, however, refused to merge and instead focused his efforts on rebuilding the shattered PC Party.

In 1996, David Frum and Ezra Levant organized the "Winds of Change" conference in Calgary, an early attempt to encourage the Reform Party of Canada and Progressive Conservative Party of Canada to merge so that a united rightwing party could defeat the Liberal Party of Canada in the subsequent election. Manning and Charest were both invited to attend but declined.

== 1997–2000: The United Alternative / Canadian Alliance ==

After the second Liberal win in 1997, it became increasingly obvious that having two right-of-centre parties was splitting the vote and ensuring further Liberal majorities. Reform leader Manning was criticized by some members in his own party and by Western media for not "broadening the popular base of Reform." Manning had originally suggested that the Reform Party was meant to be a new party, a third way as a populist alternative that could replace the complacent Liberals and PCs as a new national movement, but this hope was clearly not materializing beyond the Manitoba-Ontario border. There was some hope for cooperation from the PCs when Charest stepped down as leader in 1998. Several credible political figures, including Manitoba Progressive Conservative cabinet minister Brian Pallister, Major-General Lewis MacKenzie, former Reform MP (and future prime minister) Stephen Harper, and the former Alberta treasurer Jim Dinning were all encouraged to run as Unite the Right candidates by both sides of the conservative divide in the 1998 Progressive Conservative leadership convention. But the two candidates on the final ballot, Prairie anti-free-trade activist David Orchard and former prime minister Joe Clark, were both opposed to a merger. Clark was re-elected leader of the PC Party and insisted that the only way to unite the right would be for Reformers to join the PCs under the "big tent" of the Progressive Conservatives Party.

Reformers were convinced that a union would have to involve the creation of a new party, as opposed to one party being enveloped by the other. Therefore, the Reform Party launched a number of efforts to convince like-minded PCs to join with them in creating a new united right-of-centre movement for Canada regardless of the agenda of the PC leadership. A secondary goal of the movement was to at least have the current parties agree not to run two right-of-centre candidates in the same ridings in the next federal election. A series of informal conferences and mini-conventions were staged under the auspices of Manning and the Reform Party on the benefits of a "United Alternative."

While the United Alternative movement was focused on creating a broader coalition for conservative voters, it had to compete with social conservatives who wanted the Reform Party to shift further to the right, as opposed to the moderate centre and Red Toryism. These members believed that the Reform Party could become a political opposite to the New Democratic Party by only running candidates in the West. In times of minority, the NDP has influenced left-leaning tendencies in the Liberal Party's social policies. Many Reformers argued that the Reform Party could influence the Progressive Conservative Party's social policies in a similar manner by forcing the PCs to adopt more right-wing solutions in order to obtain support from Western Reform MPs in future minority PC governments.

In 1998, under the auspices of 1993 Reform Party candidate and ardent social conservative Craig Chandler, a controversial "Unite the Right" conference was held in Toronto, Ontario. The conference attracted a great deal of negative media attention for not just including MPs and delegates from the Reform and Progressive Conservative parties, but also leadership officials from the right-wing social conservative Christian Heritage Party, Social Credit Party, the Confederation of Regions Party, Family Coalition Party of Ontario and delegates from the Freedom Party of Ontario. After this conference, polls were conducted that suggested that many Progressive Conservative supporters would rather vote Liberal than vote for a new merged Reform/PC political entity.

The efforts to create a United Alternative did not sit well with the leadership of the Progressive Conservatives. The PC Party eventually passed an amendment to the party's constitution stating that the party had to run a candidate in every federal riding in the next election. Having been rebuffed by PC leader Joe Clark, Manning urged the Reform Party membership to "Think Big" and eventually a real "United Right" effort was launched. In early 2000, the Reform Party held two national conventions in Ottawa that culminated in its demise and the creation of the "Canadian Conservative Reform Alliance", or CCRA. However, a number of pundits pointed out that if the word "party" was added on to the end of the name, the acronym would actually be CCRAP. Consequentially, the name was changed to the "Canadian Reform Conservative Alliance", more commonly known as the Canadian Alliance.

Not all Reformers were in favour of the creation of a new right-wing political party. Some Reformers were actually populists who did not necessarily aspire to right-wing solutions for government in Canada. Led by Reform MPs Darrel Stinson and Myron Thompson, a protest movement was launched known as "Grassroots United Against Reform's Demise" or GUARD. The movement sent letters and e-mails to party members and officials urging them to not vote in favour of a new party.

Ultimately, Manning's bid to create a new party was successful, although the personal consequences for his initiative would be high. The Canadian Alliance leadership race was expected to be a pro forma contest in which Manning's leadership would be easily reconfirmed. However, the race quickly became a contest. Many CA members felt that a new party needed a new leader. Eventually Manning's bid for the CA leadership was defeated by Alberta Member of the Legislative Assembly (MLA) and Provincial Treasurer Stockwell Day. While the party was seen by some as a happy union of former Reformers and Blue Tory PCs who were disaffected with Joe Clark's Red Tory leadership, the Canadian Alliance was still seen by many as merely the Reform Party in new clothes. Furthermore, many Reformers became disaffected with the CA due to Manning's ouster as the movement's leader.

== 2000–2002: Fragmentation of the Canadian Alliance ==
After a below-expectations result in the 2000 election and the failure of the CA to reduce Joe Clark's PCs to independent status, a year of factional in-fighting began in 2001 over Stockwell Day's troubled leadership of the Canadian Alliance. Several controversies surrounding Day's personality, statements, and actions led to a number of disaffected CA officials and MPs, including party stalwarts Deborah Grey and Chuck Strahl, to formally break with the Alliance caucus. Thirteen MPs left the Canadian Alliance during this period of instability. The thirteen MPs sat as the Democratic Representative Caucus (DRC) and eventually decided to affiliate themselves with the PCs, sitting as one group in the House of Commons and holding joint meetings. The DRC also launched its own website and began setting up "Democratic Reform Party" constituency associations in anticipation of a snap election.

After the near collapse of the Canadian Alliance and the rise in defections to the DRC, it appeared that the right in Canada would remain fractious and fragmented into the foreseeable future. From September 2001 to May 2002, three separate elected right-wing political entities existed in the House of Commons (the PCs, the CA and the DRC). Many journalists and media analysts were convinced that the Right would totally melt down in a future election with so many conflicting factions competing for the same voter base. When asked by reporters in January 2002 about the troubles on the right, Liberal Heritage Minister Sheila Copps aptly conveyed the glee of the governing Liberals at the fractiousness in the conservative movement when she quipped, "burn, baby, burn!" Many political pundits were convinced that with no credible national alternative, the Liberals would easily cruise to a fourth straight majority victory in a future 2004 election. The almost constant turmoil and change in leadership of the Official Opposition between 2000 and 2002 led to a fair perception that the Chrétien government was getting a free ride from a hived opposition.

== 2002: New leadership ==
In April 2002, Stockwell Day was replaced as leader of the Canadian Alliance by Stephen Harper, one of the original "Class of '88" founders of the Reform Party. Unlike Day, Harper proved to be an able leader and managed to repair most of the damage that his predecessor's leadership had caused. With Harper at the helm, all but two DRC MPs who had left the party's caucus returned to the Canadian Alliance. With Day no longer running the Canadian Alliance, a merger was also much more agreeable to many stalwart Tory members. PC leader Joe Clark, who had spurned off many attempts to unite the right during his leadership, announced his impending retirement as PC leader in August 2002 after the PC-DRC Coalition Caucus dissolved. A leadership election was scheduled for May 2003.

On May 31, 2003, Peter MacKay of Nova Scotia won the PC leadership election. Unlike Clark, MacKay supported open discussions on the concepts of a united party. He promised that, on his watch, no full-fledged union would take place. Shortly after becoming leader, MacKay signalled his openness to broad "talks" with the Canadian Alliance with regard to creating more unity on the right.

== 2003: Merger negotiations ==
Over the summer and autumn of 2003, a series of protracted negotiations took place between PC and CA "emissaries": Bill Davis, Don Mazankowski and Loyola Hearn for the PCs and Gerry St. Germain, Ray Speaker and Scott Reid for the CA. The identities of the emissaries was public knowledge, but the participation of Belinda Stronach (daughter of auto-parts magnate Frank Stronach) as chair and moderator for the discussions was not publicly known until later.

The negotiations were largely motivated by the juggernaut takeover of the Liberal Party by the extremely popular and successful former Liberal finance minister Paul Martin, and the marked reduction in membership and political donations for both parties due to voter frustration with the status quo Liberal hegemony. Polls showed both the beleaguered PC and Alliance parties losing a large number of seats in the next election to a Martin-led Liberal team across Canada if an amenable solution was not found.

== 2003–2004: Creation of the Conservative Party of Canada ==
The goal of a united right was realized in the autumn of 2003. The summer negotiations eventually produced the Conservative Party Agreement-in-Principle between the PCs and the CA on the establishment of a new Conservative Party of Canada. On October 16, 2003, Alliance leader Stephen Harper and Progressive Conservative leader Peter MacKay announced the formation of the new united conservative party. Both leaders insisted that the union was not about egos; it was really about making an enormous contribution to protecting tangible democratic freedoms and political choice in Canada. Harper was widely quoted by many media officials during the press conference when he stated, "Our swords will henceforth be pointed at the Liberals, not at each other."

The main sticking point during the autumn negotiations had been the method of choosing the merged party's leader. The PCs pushed for an equal number of votes for each riding that would benefit their lower but much more nationally representative membership (65,000); the Alliance hoped for a one-member one vote system that would benefit their much larger, but centralized, Western membership (120,000). Harper conceded the issue. In early December, 95.9% of the CA membership approved the union, and 90.4% of the PC Party delegates also endorsed the initiative in a national convention. The party was officially formed on December 7, 2003. Harper was elected leader of the fledgeling Conservative Party of Canada on March 20, 2004, by the new party's 350,000 members spread out across 301 equally weighted federal ridings. Peter MacKay was appointed deputy leader.

== Aftermath ==
Months later, Liberal prime minister Paul Martin called for a general election. However, in the interim between the formation of the new party and the selection of its new leader, investigations into the Canadian Sponsorship scandal and the investigation by the Gomery Commission had knocked some wind out of the Liberal Party's political sails, resulting in the election being backed up to late June as opposed to early April. This allowed the Conservatives to be more prepared for the race, unlike the 2000 snap election. For the first time since the 1984 election, the Liberal Party would have to deal with a united conservative opposition.

Polls indicated an increase in support for the new Conservative Party and by all pollster indications by mid-campaign, it seemed as if Harper was on the verge of becoming prime minister of a minority government. However, even at their highest level of support, the Conservatives were still some percentage points off the combined total of the two separate right-wing parties that had run in the last election. A number of prominent ex-PCs also chose to support the Liberals. These included MPs Scott Brison, Keith Martin, and John Herron, who crossed the floor to the Liberals. Lukewarm endorsements of Liberal Party candidates at the onset of the campaign were extended by former PC MPs Joe Clark, Brian Mulroney, André Bachand, Rick Borotsik, and former federal PC Party president Bruck Easton.

Harper's new Conservatives emerged from the election with a larger parliamentary caucus of 99 MPs. Chuck Cadman, a former CA MP who failed to win the Conservative Party nomination in his riding, was re-elected as an independent. The Liberals were reduced to a thin minority government, relegating the governing party to obtaining support from at least two of the three opposition parties to pass legislation.

In the 2006 Canadian federal election, after a decade of work, the Conservatives seemed to attain their goal of being an electable "United Alternative" when they were given a minority government by the electorate. In the 2011 federal election, the Conservatives under Harper won a majority government, the first majority for a main right-of-centre party since the defeat of the Campbell PC Party in 1993.

== Provincial 'Unite the Right' ==
The term 'Unite the Right' has been used to describe the union of centre-right parties in provinces with a strong New Democratic Party (NDP). United in one right-leaning party, individuals who would vote either Liberal or Conservative federally have joined at different occasions to stop the left-leaning NDP. Notable examples of this are the Liberal Party of British Columbia, and the Saskatchewan Party.

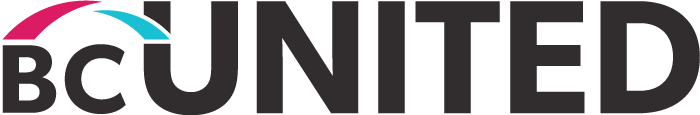
BC United logo with both teal (for the conservatives) and pink (for the liberals)

In British Columbia, there was a Liberal–Conservative alliance from 1941 to 1951, mainly aimed at stopping the rise of the Co-operative Commonwealth Federation.

The coalition was dissolved by the Liberals in 1952. Historically, the British Columbia Social Credit Party was British Columbia's right-leaning coalition party between 1952 and 1991. In 2004, the British Columbia Unity Party and British Columbia Conservative Party alongside other right-leaning parties entered into unsuccessful merger negotiations. Between 2022 and 2023, the Liberal Party changed their name to BC United, and changed the colours of the party to teal and pink.

In Alberta, the Alberta Party Political Association, known in its short form as the Alberta Party, began as an alliance of the Social Credit Party of Alberta, Western Canada Concept, and the Heritage Party of Alberta in 1986. In 2006, the Alberta Alliance entered into merger negotiations with the Alberta Party and the Social Credit Party. The Social Credit Party terminated merger discussions, the Alberta Alliance merged with the Wildrose Party of Alberta to create the Wildrose Alliance, while the Alberta Party shifted to become a centrist to centre-right party. In 2017, the renamed Wildrose Party and the Progressive Conservative Association of Alberta merged to form the United Conservative Party, one which would dominate Albertan politics.

In the 1970s, the Social Credit Party of Saskatchewan merged into the Progressive Conservative Party of Saskatchewan. Eventually, members of the Saskatchewan Liberal Party and the Progressive Conservatives united to create the Saskatchewan Party.

From 1936 to 1970, the Union Nationale in Quebec was a coalition party of right-wing Liberals and Conservatives. The party would be primarily spearheaded by Maurice Duplessis, who achieved premiership twice, from 1936 to 1939, and from 1944 to 1959.

In August 2024, prior to the 2024 British Columbia general election, BC United suspended their election campaign and withdrew all their candidates to endorse the Conservative Party of British Columbia.

BC United leader — Kevin Falcon — claimed that the decision was necessary to prevent vote-splitting that would ultimately benefit the governing New Democratic Party. A number of BC United candidates ran under the Conservative party banner and were elected. However, the Conservatives were unable to form government in the subsequent election, as the BC NDP were able to retain a bare majority.

== See also ==
- Politics of Canada
- Progressive Canadian Party
- Liberal–National party merger
- Conscription Crisis of 1917
