= The Fight for Canada =

1993 book by David Orchard

- Author: David Orchard
- Language: English
- Publisher: Stoddart Publishing Company; Robert Davies Multimedia Publishing
- Publication date: 1993
- Publication place: Canada
- Media type: Print
- Pages: 292
- ISBN: 978-0-7737-5569-7

The Fight for Canada: Four Centuries of Resistance to American Expansionism is a 1993 non-fiction book by David Orchard. It was first published in April 1993 through the Stoddart Publishing Company and a revised edition with five new chapters was released in 1998 through Robert Davies. It details the history of Canada and the many attempts of annexation, by military or political means, by the United States.

A primary impetus for Orchard to write this book was the pending Free Trade Agreement (FTA) and later the North American Free Trade Agreement (NAFTA). He was, and still is, a strong opponent to these agreements.

== Reception ==
Critical reception has been mixed. The Calgary Herald gave a positive review for The Fight for Canada, favourably comparing Orchard to the Canadian nationalist Mel Hurtig. Books in Canada was more mixed in their review, as they felt that the first half of the book contained "propaganda by the selection of historical excerpts".

== See also ==
- Trans-Pacific Partnership
- United States–Mexico–Canada Agreement
