= Brian Pallister =

Premier of Manitoba from 2016 to 2021

Brian Pallister OM
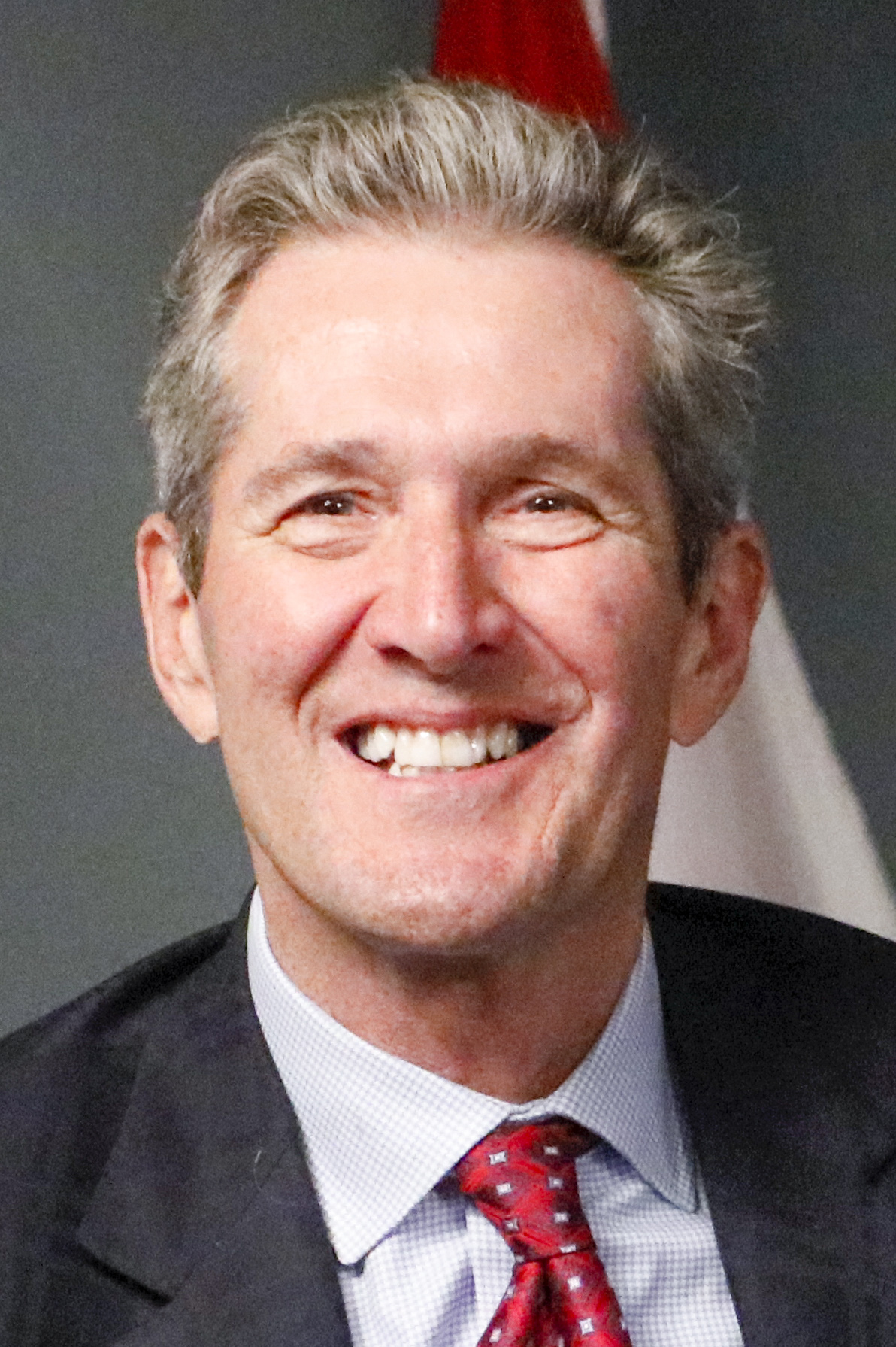
- Pallister in 2019

22nd Premier of Manitoba
- In office May 3, 2016 – September 1, 2021
- Monarch: Elizabeth II
- Lieutenant Governor: Janice Filmon
- Deputy: Heather Stefanson; Kelvin Goertzen
- Preceded by: Greg Selinger
- Succeeded by: Kelvin Goertzen

Leader of the Opposition in Manitoba
- In office July 30, 2012 – May 3, 2016
- Preceded by: Hugh McFadyen
- Succeeded by: Flor Marcelino

Leader of the Progressive Conservative Party of Manitoba
- In office July 30, 2012 – September 1, 2021
- Deputy: Heather Stefanson; Kelvin Goertzen
- Preceded by: Hugh McFadyen
- Succeeded by: Kelvin Goertzen (interim)

Member of the Legislative Assembly of Manitoba for Fort Whyte
- In office September 4, 2012 – October 4, 2021
- Preceded by: Hugh McFadyen
- Succeeded by: Obby Khan

Member of the Legislative Assembly of Manitoba for Portage la Prairie
- In office September 15, 1992 – April 28, 1997
- Preceded by: Edward Connery
- Succeeded by: David Faurschou

Member of Parliament for Portage—Lisgar
- In office November 27, 2000 – October 14, 2008
- Preceded by: Jake Hoeppner
- Succeeded by: Candice Bergen

Minister of Government Services
- In office May 9, 1995 – January 6, 1997
- Premier: Gary Filmon
- Preceded by: Gerry Ducharme
- Succeeded by: Frank Pitura

Personal details
- Born: Brian William Pallister; July 6, 1954 (age 72) Portage la Prairie, Manitoba, Canada
- Party: Progressive Conservative Party of Manitoba
- Other political affiliations: Progressive Conservative Party of Canada (before 2000); Canadian Alliance (2000–2003); Conservative Party of Canada (2003–present)
- Spouse: Esther Johnson
- Children: 2
- Education: Brandon University (BA, BEd)

Brian William Pallister OM (born July 6, 1954) is a Canadian politician who served as the 22nd premier of Manitoba from 2016 until 2021. He served as leader of the Progressive Conservative Party of Manitoba from 2012 to 2021. He had been a cabinet minister in the provincial government of Gary Filmon and a member of the House of Commons of Canada from 2000 to 2008.

== Early life and career ==
Pallister was born in Portage la Prairie, Manitoba, the son of Anne Ethel (Poyser) and Bill Pallister. He holds Bachelor of Arts and Bachelor of Education degrees from Brandon University. From 1976 to 1979, he worked as a high school teacher in rural Manitoba, where he also served as the local union representative. He later became a chartered financial analyst. Pallister is also a skilled curler and won the provincial mixed curling championship in 2000. This qualified him for the 2001 Canadian Mixed Curling Championship, which he finished with a 3–8 record in second last place.

== Provincial politics ==
Pallister began his political career at the provincial level, winning a by-election in Portage la Prairie on September 15, 1992, as a candidate of the Progressive Conservative Party of Manitoba. He entered the provincial legislature as a backbench supporter of the Filmon government and pushed for balanced budget legislation. In 1993, he endorsed Jean Charest's bid to lead the Progressive Conservative Party of Canada.

Pallister was reelected in the 1995 provincial election, and sworn into cabinet on May 9, 1995, as Minister of Government Services. He carried out reforms that eliminated almost 3,000 pages of statutory regulations as part of a government campaign against regulations, presided over changes to the Manitoba Disaster Assistance Board, and oversaw provincial flood claims. He stepped down from cabinet on January 6, 1997, to prepare for his first federal campaign.

Pallister defeated Paul-Emile Labossiere to win the Progressive Conservative nomination for Portage—Lisgar in the 1997 federal election, and formally resigned his seat in the legislature on April 28, 1997. He lost to Reform Party incumbent Jake Hoeppner by 1,449 votes.

There were rumours that Pallister would campaign to succeed Filmon as leader of the Progressive Conservative Party of Manitoba in 2000, but he declined.

== Federal politics ==
=== 1998 Progressive Conservative Party of Canada leadership bid ===
In 1998, Pallister campaigned for the leadership of the federal Progressive Conservative Party on a platform designed to win back voters who had left the party for Reform. His supporters included former cabinet ministers Don Mazankowski and Charlie Mayer, Senator Consiglio Di Nino, and Jim Jones, the sole Progressive Conservative representative in the House of Commons from Ontario. He finished fourth on the first ballot of the 1998 Progressive Conservative leadership election with 12.5% support, behind David Orchard, Hugh Segal, and the eventual winner, former Prime Minister Joe Clark. He withdrew from the contest a few days later. Pallister said that Progressive Conservatives had "voted for the past" and missed an opportunity to renew themselves.

=== Canadian Alliance MP ===
In July 2000, Pallister wrote an open letter to Joe Clark announcing his candidacy in the next federal election with a dual endorsement from the Progressive Conservative and Canadian Alliance associations in Portage-Lisgar. The latter party was a successor to Reform, and emerged from the efforts of Reformers to merge with Blue Tory elements in the Progressive Conservative Party who opposed Clark's Red Tory leadership. Clark had previously rejected Pallister's proposal as a violation of the Progressive Conservative Party's constitution, and did not respond to the letter. As a result, Pallister left the Progressive Conservatives and joined the Alliance on August 17, 2000. He won his new party's nomination for Portage—Lisgar over Dennis Desrochers and former MP Felix Holtmann, in a contest marked by some bitterness.

Pallister was elected to the House of Commons in the 2000 general election, defeating his nearest opponent by over 10,000 votes. Hoeppner, running as an independent, finished in a distant fourth place. The Liberal Party won a majority government, and Pallister served on the opposition benches. He did not openly endorse anyone in the 2002 Canadian Alliance leadership election.

=== Conservative MP ===
The Canadian Alliance and Progressive Conservative parties merged on December 7, 2003, and Pallister became a member of the resulting Conservative Party of Canada. He considered launching a bid for the new party's leadership, but instead endorsed outgoing Alliance leader Stephen Harper for the position. He was easily reelected in the 2004 election, in which the Liberals were reduced to a minority government. In July 2004, he was appointed to the Official Opposition Shadow Cabinet as critic for National Revenue.

Pallister gained increased national prominence in September 2005 after drawing attention to $750,000 of apparent spending irregularities in the office of David Dingwall, the chief executive officer of the Royal Canadian Mint. Dingwall resigned after the accusations were publicized, but later claimed that his expenditures were inaccurately reported and fell within official guidelines. An independent review completed in late October 2005 found only minor discrepancies in Dingwall's expenses, amounting to less than $7,000. Pallister criticized this review as "little more than a whitewash", and argued that the auditors failed to include numerous ambiguous expenses.

Pallister sang a parody of Pink Floyd's "Another Brick in the Wall, Part Two" in the House of Commons on October 3, 2005, during the "Statements by Members" session before Question Period. The adjusted lyrics attacked David Dingwall and the Liberal government. The Speaker ruled him out of order.

Before the 2006 federal election, the Winnipeg Free Press reported that some Manitoba Progressive Conservatives were trying to persuade Pallister to challenge Stuart Murray for the provincial leadership. Murray subsequently resigned, after 45% of delegates at the party's November 2005 convention voted for a leadership review. A subsequent Free Press poll showed Pallister as the second-most popular choice to succeed Murray, after fellow MP Vic Toews. Pallister campaigned for reelection at the federal level and was noncommittal about his provincial ambitions.

Pallister was easily reelected in 2006. The Conservatives won a minority government, and Pallister requested that incoming Prime Minister Stephen Harper not consider him for a cabinet portfolio while he was making his decision about entering provincial politics. On February 17, 2006, he announced that he would not seek the provincial party leadership and would remain a federal MP. He was appointed chair of the House of Commons standing committee on Finance, and in 2007 indicated that he wanted to remove financial access to offshore tax havens such as Barbados. Later in the year, he was appointed parliamentary secretary to the Minister of International Trade and to the Minister for International Cooperation.

Pallister surprised political observers in January 2008 by announcing that he would not run in the next federal election.

== Return to provincial politics ==
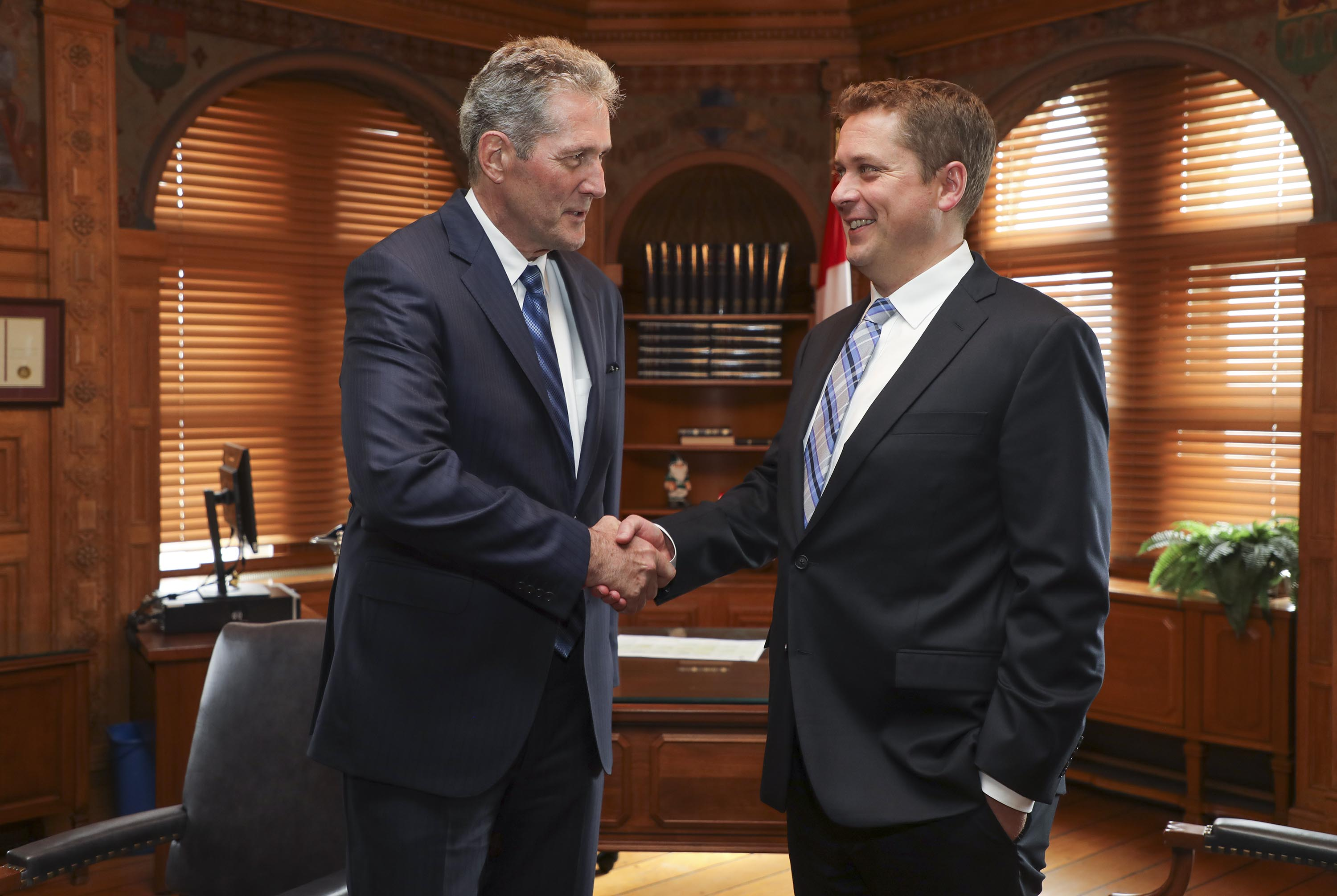
Pallister with Andrew Scheer in Ottawa in 2018.

=== Leader of the Progressive Conservative Party of Manitoba ===
After the 2011 provincial election, Hugh McFadyen announced his resignation as leader of the Progressive Conservative Party of Manitoba. On April 11, 2012, Pallister announced his intention to seek the party's leadership. On July 28, he became the presumptive nominee when the nomination process closed with no other candidates entered, and was acclaimed as leader on July 30, 2012. Two months later, he easily won a by-election for McFadyen's seat of Fort Whyte in southwest Winnipeg.

Pallister came under fire by his critics for some off-colour remarks he made while opposition leader. In 2013, when filming a holiday greeting, he called atheists "infidels". Pallister said that he never intended to offend anyone with the statement.

During a debate in the Legislature on November 24, 2014, Pallister expressed his personal disdain for Halloween when talking about the NDP's PST tax increase. He compared the government's move to that of the holiday and said Halloween was bad for the integrity of children. The video went viral a year after the statement was made.

=== 2016 Manitoba general election ===
On April 14, 2016, a CBC News report revealed that Pallister had traveled to Costa Rica 15 times since elected to Manitoba MLA in 2012. Since then, he spent about 240 days either in Costa Rica or en route.

Pallister's Tories went into the election having led in most opinion polls for almost four years. Greg Selinger's NDP government had raised the provincial sales tax after promising not to do so. Pallister led his party to a decisive victory over the NDP, claiming 40 of the 57 available seats in the legislature – the biggest majority government in recent Manitoba history. He also became the first Progressive Conservative premier of the province since Filmon lost the 1999 election.

== Premier of Manitoba (2016–2021) ==
Pallister and his cabinet were sworn in on May 3, 2016. He led the PCs to re-election with a slightly decreased majority in 2019.

=== Economic policy ===
==== Housing ====
In June 2019, Pallister's government signed onto the National Housing Strategy with the federal government. The 10-year agreement with the federal government promised to invest almost $450.8 million to expand and repair social and community housing in the province. The strategy was cost shared by both levels of government, with Manitoba contributing $225.4 million to the agreement.

==== PST changes ====
Pallister reduced Manitoba's provincial sales tax (PST) to 7 percent (down from 8 percent) in his government's 2019 budget, effective July 1. In 2021, his government exempted the PST from personal services such as haircuts and salon services.

==== Carbon tax ====
Pallister, just like fellow conservative premiers Doug Ford, Jason Kenney and Scott Moe, is opposed to Prime Minister Justin Trudeau's federal-imposed carbon tax. In 2019, Pallister's government filed a court challenge against it. On March 25, 2021, when the Supreme Court of Canada ruled that the federal government's carbon tax plan is constitutional, Pallister said that Manitoba will continue the challenge.

=== COVID-19 pandemic ===
Pallister led the provincial government response to the COVID-19 pandemic in Manitoba. In December 2020, he received international attention and praise on social media for his "impassioned plea" for adherence to social distancing restrictions during the Holiday season to keep people safe. However, many of these social media posts were later taken down when it came to light that Manitobans were reported as finding the province's response too slow, waiting for infection rates to soar before increasing restrictions, allowing the virus a rapid spread into October and November, when the province witnessed the worst per capita rate of infection in Canada. Critics of Pallister's government blamed the surge of COVID-19 cases in part on Pallister's Restart Manitoba plan, which encouraged the re-opening of the provincial economy in direct opposition to the advice of many Manitoba doctors. Pallister faced similar criticism during the third wave of the virus in May 2021, with changes to the Public Health Orders coming weeks after some critics first called for. Critics rejected his assertions that the province had already imposed some of the toughest restrictions in the country, with Opposition Party Leaders alleging he was not competent to govern in a pandemic. The Pallister government's slow response during the third wave further led to a lack of space in intensive care units in Manitoba and the transfer of several patients to hospitals out of province in Thunder Bay, Sault Ste Marie, North Bay, and Ottawa, many of whom died either en route or far from family and advocates.

=== Indigenous relations ===
On July 7, 2021, Pallister gained controversy when he made remarks about colonial settlers, some who operated the Canadian Indian residential school system, stating that "the people [colonists] who came here to this country, before it was a country and since, didn't come here to destroy anything. They came here to build. They came to build better." The comments prompted his Minister of Indigenous Reconciliation and Northern Relations, Eileen Clarke, to resign. Her successor, Alan Lagimodiere, instantly gained controversy after he defended the residential school system, saying that "At the time I think the intent…they thought they were doing the right thing. In retrospect, it's easy to judge in the past. But at the time, they really thought that they were doing the right thing." Weeks later, Pallister apologised for his comments, although many First Nations chiefs were unsatisfied with his apology, believing that it was insufficient and came too late.

=== Resignation ===
On August 10, 2021, Palister announced that he would be resigning as Premier on September 1 and not be seeking re-election in the next provincial election. Deputy Premier Kelvin Goertzen was chosen as interim leader of the PCs and officially took over as premier on September 1. Pallister resigned his seat in the legislature on October 4. Health Minister Heather Stefanson was elected as Pallister's permanent successor on October 30, and was sworn in as premier on November 2.

== Honours ==
In 2026, he was appointed to the Order of Manitoba, the province’s highest honour.

== Electoral record ==
=== 2019 Manitoba general election ===
2019 Manitoba general election: Fort Whyte
Party	Candidate	Votes	%	±%
Progressive Conservative	Brian Pallister	5,619	57.19	-6.99
New Democratic	Beatrice Bruske	1,757	17.88	+1.61
Liberal	Darrel Morin	1,731	17.62	+6.21
Green	Sara Campbell	665	6.77	-0.15
Manitoba First	Jason Holenski	54	0.54	-0.65
Total valid votes		9,826	100.0	
Eligible voters		16,386		
Source: Elections Manitoba

=== 2016 Manitoba general election ===
2016 Manitoba general election: Fort Whyte
Party	Candidate	Votes	%	±%
Progressive Conservative	Brian Pallister	6,775	64.18	+9.00
New Democratic	George Wong	1,718	16.27	+5.02
Liberal	Peter Bastians	1,205	11.41	-20.15
Green	Carli Runions	731	6.92	+5.20
Manitoba	Daryl Newis	127	1.20	+1.20
Total valid votes		10,556	100.0	
Eligible voters		–		
Source: Elections Manitoba

=== 2012 by-election ===
Manitoba provincial by-election, September 4, 2012: Fort Whyte Resignation of Hugh McFadyen
Party	Candidate	Votes	%	±%	Expenditures
Progressive Conservative	Brian Pallister	3,626	55.18	-7.29	
Liberal	Bob Axworthy	2,074	31.56	+23.64	
New Democratic	Brandy Schmidt	739	11.25	-18.36	
Green	Donnie Benham	113	1.72	–	
Independent	Darrell Ackman	19	0.29		
Total valid votes		6,571	99.88		
Rejected and declined votes		8	0.12		
Turnout		6,579	42.28	-19.63	
Electors on the lists		15,560			

=== 2006 Canadian federal election ===
2006 Canadian federal election: Portage—Lisgar
Party	Candidate	Votes	%	±%	Expenditures
Conservative	Brian Pallister	25,719	69.78	+3.85	$44,321.83
Liberal	Garry McLean	4,199	11.39	−6.35	$13,875.88
New Democratic	Daren Van Den Bussche	4,072	11.05	+1.70	$2,450.07
Green	Charlie Howatt	1,880	5.10	+2.64	$4,073.82
Christian Heritage	David Reimer	987	2.68	−1.51	$9,372.57
Total valid votes		36,857	99.67		
Total rejected ballots		123	0.33	−0.09	
Turnout		36,890	61.66	+4.31	
Eligible voters		59,970	–	–	
Conservative hold		Swing		+5.10	
Sources: Official Results, Elections Canada and Financial Returns, Elections Canada.

=== 2004 Canadian federal election ===
2004 Canadian federal election: Portage—Lisgar
Party	Candidate	Votes	%	±%	Expenditures
Conservative	Brian Pallister	22,939	65.93	−0.02	$55,524.92
Liberal	Don Kuhl	6,174	17.74	−1.75	$70,773.27
New Democratic	Daren Van Den Bussche	3,251	9.34	+3.89	$13,159.49
Christian Heritage	David Reimer	1,458	4.19		$12,986.64
Green	Marc Payette	856	2.46		$649.69
Communist	Allister Cucksey	117	0.34		$741.52
Total valid votes		34,795	99.58		
Total rejected ballots		146	0.42		
Turnout		34,941	57.35		
Eligible voters		60,922	–	–	
Conservative notional hold		Swing		+0.87	
Percentage change figures are compared to redistributed results from 2000. Conservative Party percentages are contrasted with the combined Canadian Alliance and Progressive Conservative percentages.
Sources: Official Results, Elections Canada and Financial Returns, Elections Canada.

=== 2000 Canadian federal election ===
2000 Canadian federal election: Portage—Lisgar
Party	Candidate	Votes	%	±%	Expenditures
Alliance	Brian Pallister	17,318	50.31	+10.07	$44,417.63
Liberal	Gerry J.E. Gebler	6,133	17.82	+3.21	$44,267.57
Progressive Conservative	Morley McDonald	5,339	15.51	−20.42	$16,872.28
Independent	Jake Hoeppner	3,558	10.34		$40,395.49
New Democratic	Diane Beresford	2,073	6.02	−1.17	$3,880.73
Total valid votes		34,421	99.71		
Total rejected ballots		101	0.29	−0.15	
Turnout		34,522	61.56	+0.93	
Eligible voters		56,082	–	–	
Alliance hold		Swing		+3.43	
Sources: Official Results, Elections Canada, Official Voting Results and Financial Returns, Elections Canada.

^ Canadian Alliance results compared to Reform

=== 1997 Canadian federal election ===
1997 Canadian federal election: Portage—Lisgar
Party	Candidate	Votes	%	Expenditures
Reform	Jake Hoeppner	13,532	40.25	$55,221
Progressive Conservative	Brian Pallister	12,083	35.94	$52,473
Liberal	Heather Mack	4,913	14.61	$14,412
New Democratic	Glen Hallick	2,420	7.20	$9,391
Christian Heritage	Martin Dewit	517	1.54	$2,674
Canadian Action	Roy Lyall	159	0.47	$1,210
Total valid votes		33,624	99.56	
Total rejected ballots		149	0.44	
Turnout		33,773	60.63	
Eligible voters		55,706	–	
Sources: Official Results, Elections Canada, Official Voting Results and Financial Returns, Elections Canada.

=== 1995 Manitoba general election ===
1995 Manitoba general election: Portage la Prairie
Party	Candidate	Votes	%	Expenditures
Progressive Conservative	Brian Pallister	3,977	51.36	$21,925.75
Liberal	Bob Turner	2,117	27.34	$22,544.59
New Democratic	Connie Gretsinger	1,519	19.62	$3,123.00
Independent	Ralph Jackson	130	1.68	$0.00
Total valid votes		7,743	100.00	
Rejected and discarded votes		21		
Turnout		7,764	65.84	
Registered voters		11,792		

=== 1992 by-election ===
Manitoba provincial by-election, September 15, 1992: Portage la Prairie Resignation of Ed Connery
Party	Candidate	Votes	%	Expenditures
Progressive Conservative	Brian Pallister	3,226	51.56	$17,992.91
Liberal	Helen Christoffersen	1,995	31.88	$12,952.25
New Democratic	Ralph Jackson	648	10.36	$13,381.00
Reform	Fred Debrecen	388	6.20	$0.00
Total valid votes		6,257	99.68	
Rejected ballots		20	0.32	
Turnout		6,277	53.81	
Registered voters		11,665		

All electoral information is taken from Elections Canada and Elections Manitoba. Provincial expenditures refer to individual candidate expenses. Italicized expenditures refer to submitted totals, and are presented when the final reviewed totals are not available.

Political offices
Preceded by Greg Selinger	Premier of Manitoba; 2016–2021	Succeeded by Kelvin Goertzen
Preceded by Hugh McFadyen	Leader of the Opposition (Manitoba); 2012–2016	Succeeded by Flor Marcelino
Manitoba provincial government of Gary Filmon
Cabinet post (1)
Predecessor	Office	Successor
Gerald Ducharme	Minister of Government Services; 1995–1997	Frank Pitura
Legislative Assembly of Manitoba
Preceded by Ed Connery	Member of the Manitoba Legislature for Portage la Prairie; 1992–1997	Succeeded by David Faurschou
Preceded by Hugh McFadyen	Member of the Manitoba Legislature for Fort Whyte; 2012–present	Incumbent
