= Quebec referendum =

Quebec referendum may refer to one of the two referendums held solely in Quebec:

- 1980 Quebec referendum, the 1980 plebiscite to grant the Government of Quebec a mandate to negotiate sovereignty-association
- 1995 Quebec referendum, the 1995 referendum to allow the Government of Quebec, after offering a partnership to Canada, to declare independence

It could possibly also refer to:

- 1919 Quebec prohibition referendum

== See also ==
- Referendums in Canada
