= Leadership convention =

Held by a political party in Canada to choose a leader

In Canadian politics, a leadership convention is held by a political party when the party needs to choose a leader due to a pending resignation, a vacancy or a challenge to the incumbent leader.

== Overview ==
In Canada, leaders of a party generally remain that party's de facto candidate for Prime Minister until they die, resign, or are dismissed by the party. In the federal New Democratic Party (NDP) and some provincial NDPs, the position of party leader was treated as all other positions on the party's executive committee, and open for election at party conventions generally held every two years although incumbent leaders rarely face more than token opposition.

Usually, outgoing leaders of a Canadian political party remain as leaders until their successor is chosen at a leadership convention. However, in some circumstances, such as the death or immediate resignation of a leader, that is not possible, and an interim leader is appointed by the party for the duration of the leadership campaign.

In a few instances where a single leadership candidate has been unopposed by the entry deadline, the leadership convention has instead served as a venue for the membership to ratify the candidate. Even in such situations, however, the convention must still take place before the candidate can assume the formal and permanent leadership of the party, even if they are already serving as the party's interim leader.

Traditionally, each riding association of a party holds a special meeting to elect a fixed number of delegates to represent it at a leadership convention. These meetings would often select "alternate delegates" or "alternates", who would attend the convention but vote only if one of the delegates from the riding association was unable to attend. In addition, delegates are often selected by the party's youth and women's associations in each riding, and party associations at university and college campuses.

In addition to the elected delegates, a large number of ex officio delegates attend and vote at leadership conventions. These ex officio delegates are automatically entitled to attend by virtue of being an elected member of parliament for that party, a member of an affiliated party in a provincial legislature, a member of the party's national or provincial executive, of the executive of an affiliated women's or youth organization.

Because of the implementation of "one member one vote" (OMOV) systems and proportional delegate elections by most parties, conventions have declined in importance. In recent years, the result of the vote is either known before the convention, or the voting does not take place at the venue.

In a pure "one-member one-vote" system, each party member casts a ballot to elect the leader, and all ballots have equal weight. Modified OMOV systems may allow all members to vote but may weight the votes differently in order to ensure equality among ridings regardless of party membership or to guarantee a proportion of the vote to historically important constituencies (such as labour in the case of the NDP).

The Liberal Party of Canada held the first leadership convention in 1919, electing William Lyon Mackenzie King. Prior to that the leader of the party was chosen by the party's parliamentary caucus. The historical Conservative Party used a leadership convention to select R.B. Bennett as party leader in 1927.

The Parti Québécois was the first political party in Canada to adopt an OMOV system. Most provincial and federal parties adopted forms of OMOV in the 1990s.

Until 2003, when it adopted an OMOV system, every biennial convention of the Co-operative Commonwealth Federation and of its successor, the New Democratic Party, in the twentieth century was a leadership convention. However, in practice, contested elections were only held in the NDP when there was a declared leadership race.

Both the modern Conservative Party and the NDP have instituted "one-member one-vote" systems in recent years. In 2003, the federal NDP used a modified system where the vote was calculated so that ballots cast by labour delegates had 25% weight in the total result while votes cast by party members had 75%. While this modification is still used by some provincial sections of the NDP, the federal NDP now uses a pure OMOV process without a carve-out for labour affiliates.

In 2004, the modern Conservative Party adopted the Progressive Conservative Party system of OMOV, where each riding had equal weight in a point system, with each riding being assigned 100 points, regardless of the number of votes cast in that riding. The party's other predecessors, the Reform Party of Canada and Canadian Alliance, had pure OMOV systems. In 2021, the party constitution was amended to award one point per vote cast in a riding, up to a maximum of 100 points.

The Liberals were the last federal party to select their leaders using delegated conventions, though more recent Liberal conventions used a system where delegates in a riding were apportioned by proportional representation. In 2009 the Liberal Party approved a constitutional amendment requiring future leadership elections to be conducted using a modified OMOV system in which each riding is accorded equal weight. The 2009 convention that ratified Michael Ignatieff's leadership was conducted under the old rules. The last delegated Liberal convention to feature a contested race was the 2006 convention that chose Stéphane Dion.

The Bloc Québécois has used a pure OMOV system since 1997. The 2020 Ontario Liberal Party leadership election was the last to use a delegated leadership convention.

== Recent federal conventions ==
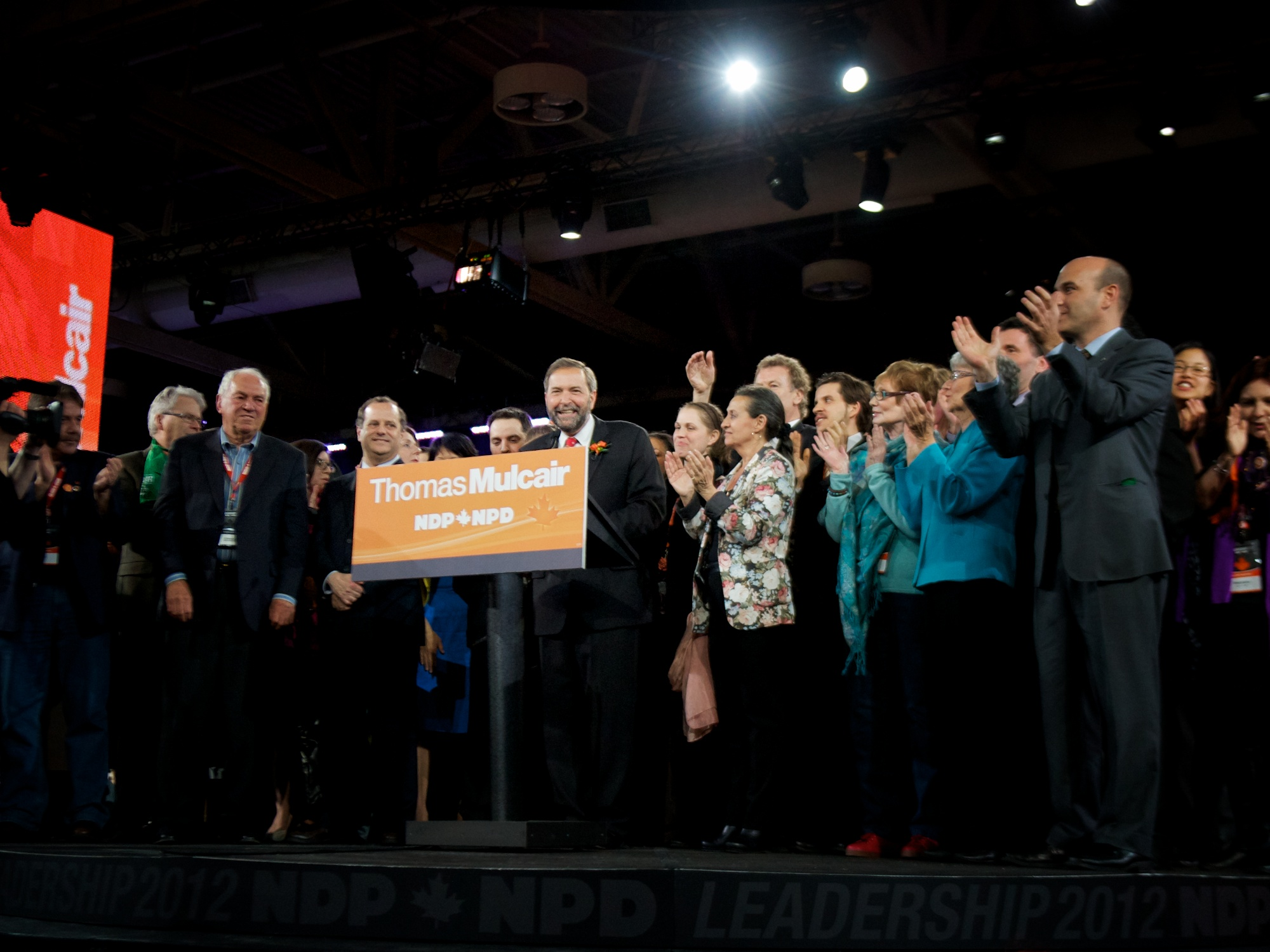
Thomas Mulcair speaks after winning the 2012 New Democratic Party leadership election.

- The Bloc Québécois held its most recent leadership convention on January 17, 2019, and elected Yves-François Blanchet as leader following the ouster of Martine Ouellet. Blanchet was acclaimed.
- The Conservative Party held its most recent leadership convention on September 10, 2022, and elected Pierre Poilievre as leader following the ouster of Erin O'Toole. Poilievre defeated Jean Charest on the first ballot.
- The Liberal Party held its most recent leadership convention on March 9, 2025, and elected Mark Carney as leader following the pending resignation of Justin Trudeau. Carney defeated Chrystia Freeland on the first ballot.
- The New Democratic Party held its most recent leadership convention on March 29, 2026, and elected Avi Lewis as leader following the resignation of Jagmeet Singh. Lewis defeated Heather McPherson on the first ballot.
- The Green Party held its most recent leadership convention on November 14, 2026, and elected Mike Morrice as leader following the pending resignation of Elizabeth May. Morrice was acclaimed.

== Recent provincial/territorial conventions ==
- Alberta: 2024 Alberta New Democratic Party leadership election
- British Columbia: 2026 Conservative Party of British Columbia leadership election
- Manitoba: 2025 Manitoba Liberal Party leadership election
- New Brunswick: 2026 Green Party of New Brunswick leadership election
- Newfoundland and Labrador: 2025 Liberal Party of Newfoundland and Labrador leadership election
- Nova Scotia: 2026 Nova Scotia Liberal Party leadership election
- Ontario: 2026 Ontario Liberal Party leadership election
- Prince Edward Island: 2026 Prince Edward Island Liberal Party leadership election
- Quebec: 2026 Coalition Avenir Québec leadership election
- Saskatchewan: 2022 Saskatchewan New Democratic Party leadership election
- Yukon: 2025 Yukon Liberal Party leadership election

== Lists of leadership conventions ==
=== Active federal parties ===
- Bloc Québécois leadership elections
- Conservative Party of Canada leadership elections
- Green Party of Canada leadership elections
- Liberal Party of Canada leadership elections
- New Democratic Party leadership conventions

=== Defunct federal parties ===
- Canadian Alliance leadership elections
- Progressive Conservative Party of Canada leadership elections
- Social Credit Party of Canada leadership conventions

=== Provincial parties ===
==== Alberta ====
- Alberta Liberal Party leadership elections
- Alberta New Democratic Party leadership elections
- Alberta Progressive Conservative Association leadership elections
- 1968 Social Credit Party of Alberta leadership election
- 2009 Wildrose Alliance Party leadership election

==== British Columbia ====
- British Columbia Liberal Party leadership conventions
- British Columbia New Democratic Party leadership conventions
- British Columbia Reform Party leadership elections
- British Columbia Social Credit Party leadership conventions

==== Manitoba ====
- Manitoba Liberal Party leadership elections
- Manitoba New Democratic Party leadership elections
- Manitoba Progressive Conservative Party leadership elections

==== New Brunswick ====
- New Brunswick Liberal Association leadership elections
- New Brunswick Progressive Conservative Party leadership elections

==== Newfoundland and Labrador ====
- Newfoundland and Labrador Liberal Party leadership elections
- Progressive Conservative Party of Newfoundland and Labrador leadership elections

==== Nova Scotia ====
- Nova Scotia Liberal Party leadership elections
- Nova Scotia New Democratic Party leadership elections
- Nova Scotia Progressive Conservative Association leadership elections

==== Ontario ====
- Ontario CCF/NDP leadership conventions
- Ontario Liberal Party leadership elections
- Ontario Progressive Conservative leadership conventions
- Green Party of Ontario leadership elections

==== Prince Edward Island ====
- Prince Edward Island Liberal Party leadership elections
- Progressive Conservative Party of Prince Edward Island leadership elections

==== Quebec ====
- Parti Québécois leadership elections
- Quebec Conservative Party leadership elections
- Quebec Liberal Party leadership elections
- Union Nationale leadership elections

==== Saskatchewan ====
- Saskatchewan New Democratic Party leadership conventions
- Saskatchewan Party leadership elections
- Progressive Conservative Party of Saskatchewan leadership elections

== See also ==
- Primary election
