= Canadian Alliance leadership elections =

Political party elections

The Canadian Alliance, a conservative political party in Canada, held two leadership elections to choose the party's leader. The first was held shortly after the party's founding in 2000, and the second was held in 2002. The party merged with the Progressive Conservative Party of Canada in 2003 to form the Conservative Party of Canada.

The 1987 founding convention of the Reform Party of Canada elected Preston Manning as party leader by acclamation. Manning was re-ratified as leader at every subsequent convention of the party without opposition.

The Reform Party became the "Canadian Reform Conservative Alliance" (better known as the "Canadian Alliance") in 2000 and had its first contested leadership election. Canadian Alliance leadership votes were conducted via a pure one member, one vote system in which each party member cast a ballot with equal weight.

In the CA's system, the leader was the candidate who received 50% plus one of all votes cast (i.e., an absolute majority). If no candidate had an absolute majority on the first ballot, the top two candidates participated in a run-off election several weeks after the first ballot.

== 2000 leadership election ==
Votes by ballot
Candidate	First Ballot June 24		Second Ballot July 8	
Candidate	Votes	%	Votes	%
Stockwell Day	53,249	44.17%	72,349	63.45%
Preston Manning	43,527	36.10%	41,869	36.6%
Tom Long	21,894	18.16%	Endorsed Manning	
Keith Martin	1,676	1.14%	Endorsed Manning	
John Stachow	211	0.18%		
Total	120,557	100.0%	114,218	100.0%

=== Candidates ===
Stockwell Day: 49, Progressive Conservative Treasurer of Alberta (1997–2000), Alberta Minister of Social Services (1996–1997) Alberta Minister of Labour (1992–1996), MLA for Red Deer North (1986–2000), and former assistant pastor and school administrator at the Bentley Christian Centre in Bentley, Alberta.

Preston Manning: 58, founder and leader of the Reform Party of Canada (1987–2000), Member of Parliament for Calgary Southwest, Alberta (1993–2002), Leader of the Opposition (1997–2000).

Tom Long:, 42, lawyer, former president of the Progressive Conservative Party of Ontario (1986–1989), chair of Ontario PC election campaigns in 1995 and 1999, co-chair of Canadian Alliance founding convention.

Keith Martin: 40, physician and Member of Parliament for the riding of Esquimalt—Juan de Fuca, British Columbia (1993–2011). Martin advocated a position that was conservative on economic issues but is socially liberal.

John Stachow: 37, Ontario Power Generation worker from Myrtle, Ontario, advocate of a "social credit", and that the government of Canada to assume direct control over the nation's money supply, rather than leaving this responsibility in the hands of private banks. Opponent of the 1913 Bank Act.

To be nominated, candidates needed to submit signatures from 300 Canadian Alliance members and a $25,000 deposit.

== 2002 leadership election ==
Votes by ballot
Candidate	First Ballot March 20, 2002	
Candidate	Votes	%
Stephen Harper	48,561	55.04%
Stockwell Day	33,074	37.49
Diane Ablonczy	3,370	3.82%
Grant Hill	3,223	3.65%
Total	88,228	100.0%

Stephen Harper: 43, President of the National Citizens Coalition (1998–2002); Reform Party Member of Parliament for Calgary West, Alberta (1993–1997), Reform Party Critic for Intergovernmental Affairs (1994–1997), and Finance (1995–1996). Economist by profession.

Stockwell Day: 51, leader of the Canadian Alliance (2000–2001), Member of Parliament for Okanagan—Coquihalla, British Columbia (2000–2011); former Alberta cabinet minister and MLA; agreed to resign and recontest the Canadian Alliance leadership following a caucus revolt.

Diane Ablonczy: 52, lawyer, Opposition Critic for Human Resources Development, Member of Parliament for Calgary North (1993–1997), then Calgary—Nose Hill, Alberta (1997–2015).

Grant Hill: 58, medical doctor, Opposition Critic for Intergovernmental Affairs, former Critic for Health (1994–1999), Member of Parliament for Macleod, Alberta (1993–2004).

During the early campaign, Toronto drag queen Enza Anderson also declared her candidacy for the leadership, although she dropped her bid before the official registration deadline.

== See also ==
- Canadian Alliance
- leadership convention
- Conservative Party of Canada leadership elections
