= Conservative Party of Canada leadership elections =

The Conservative Party of Canada elects its leaders through a process known as a leadership election. The most recent leadership election was held in 2022.

Since 2004, the party has elected its leaders on a one member, one vote basis using a ranked ballot. The process is weighted so that each riding is allocated 100 points, divided proportionately among candidates based on their percentage of the vote in that riding. This process was first used in the 1998 Progressive Conservative leadership election, a predecessor party of the current Conservative Party.

== 2004 leadership election ==
Held in Toronto, Ontario on March 20, 2004.

Results by round
Candidate	1st round			
Candidate	Votes cast	%	Points allocated	%
Stephen Harper	67,143	68.9%	17,296	56.2%
Belinda Stronach	22,286	22.9%	10,613	34.5%
Tony Clement	7,968	8.2%	2,887	9.4
Total	174,404	100%	33,800	100%

== 2017 leadership election ==
Held in Toronto, Ontario on May 27, 2017.

Results by round
Candidate	Round 1		Round 13	
Candidate	Points	%	Points	%
Andrew Scheer	7,375.79	21.82%	17,222.20	50.95%
Maxime Bernier	9,763.32	28.89%	16,577.80	49.05%
Erin O'Toole	3,600.72	10.65%		
Brad Trost	2,820.87	8.35%		
Michael Chong	2,552.47	7.55%		
Kellie Leitch	2,366.09	7.00%		
Pierre Lemieux	2,495.71	7.38%		
Lisa Raitt	1,127.93	3.34%		
Steven Blaney	426.37	1.26%		
Chris Alexander	379.10	1.12%		
Kevin O'Leary	361.21	1.07%		
Rick Peterson	220.58	0.65%		
Andrew Saxton	169.94	0.50%		
Deepak Obhrai	139.90	0.41%		

== 2020 leadership election ==
Conducted by mail-in ballot due August 21, with results announced on August 23–24.

Results by round
Candidate	1st round				2nd round				3rd round			
Candidate	Votes cast	%	Points allocated	%	Votes cast	%	Points allocated	%	Votes cast	%	Points allocated	%
Erin O'Toole	51,258	29.39%	10,681.40	31.60%	56,907	33.20%	11,903.69	35.22%	90,635	58.86%	19,271.74	57.02%
Peter MacKay	52,851	30.30%	11,328.55	33.52%	54,165	31.60%	11,756.01	34.78%	63,356	41.14%	14,528.26	42.98%
Leslyn Lewis	43,017	24.67%	6,925.38	20.49%	60,316	35.20%	10,140.30	30.00%	Eliminated			
Derek Sloan	27,278	15.64%	4,864.67	14.39%	Eliminated							
Total	174,404	100%	33,800	100%	171,388	100%	33,800	100%	153,991	100%	33,800	100%

== 2022 leadership election ==
Following the ousting of previous leader Erin O’Toole, a leadership election to choose his successor was held.

On September 10, 2022, the Conservative Party announced that Pierre Poilievre had won the election in the first round with 68% of points.

First round (points allocated)
Pierre Poilievre	68.15%
Jean Charest	16.07%
Leslyn Lewis	9.69%
Roman Baber	5.03%
Scott Aitchison	1.06%

First round (votes cast)
Pierre Poilievre	70.7%
Jean Charest	11.6%
Leslyn Lewis	11.1%
Baber	5.4%
Scott Aitchison	1.2%

Poilievre won the leadership election in a landslide, carrying 330 of 338 ridings with at least a plurality. The only other candidate to win a plurality in any ridings was Jean Charest, whose support mostly came from Quebec, though Poilievre still won 72 of the province's 78 ridings. Charest won his former federal riding of Sherbrooke, all other candidates losing their ridings to Poilievre.

== See also ==
- Progressive Conservative Party of Canada leadership elections
- Canadian Alliance leadership elections
