= Michael Fortier =

Canadian politician (born 1962)

The Honourable Michael Fortier PC
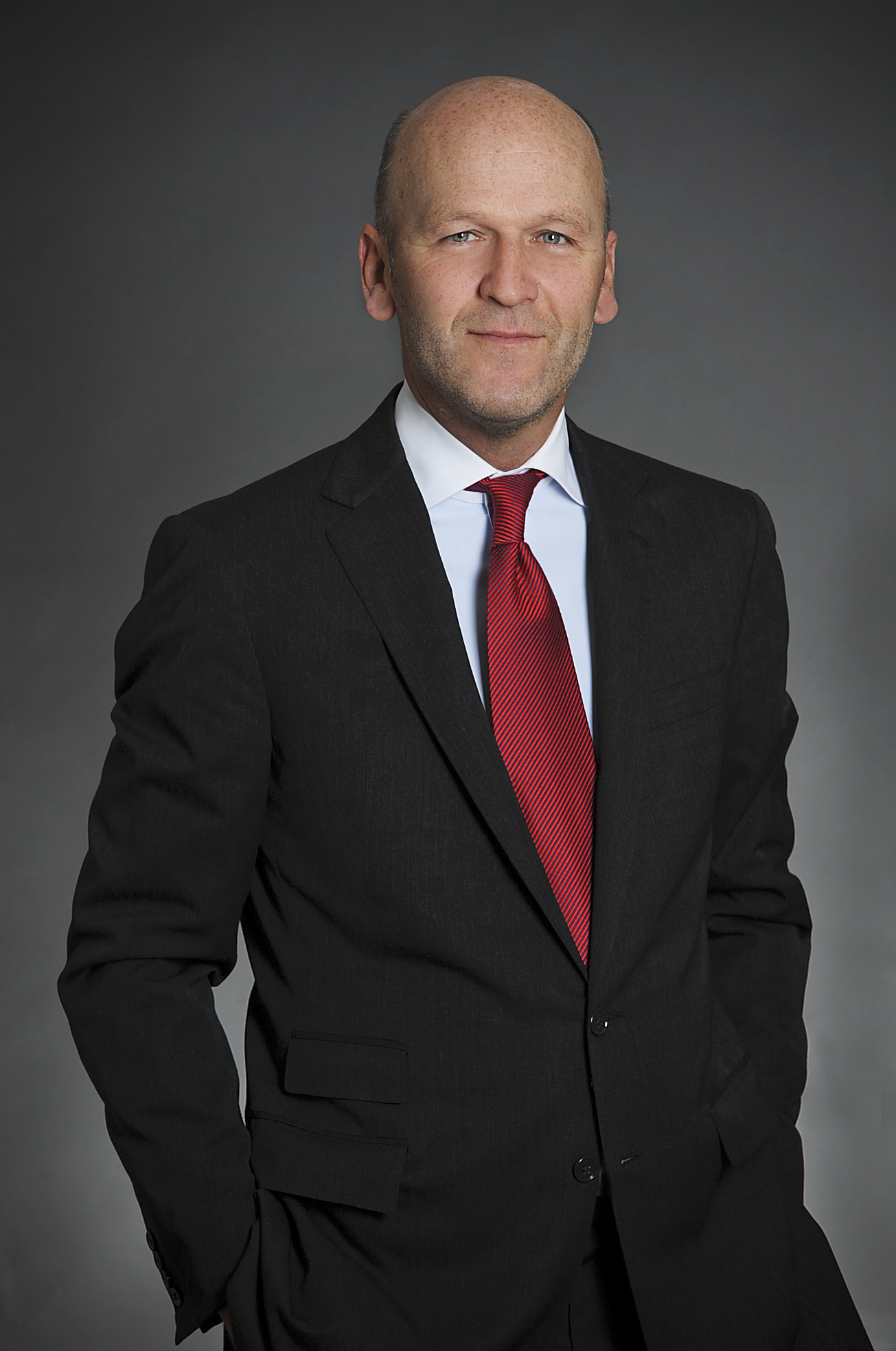
- Michael Fortier in 2010

Minister of International Trade
- In office June 25, 2008 – October 29, 2008
- Preceded by: David Emerson
- Succeeded by: Stockwell Day

Minister of Public Works and Government Services
- In office February 6, 2006 – June 25, 2008
- Preceded by: Scott Brison
- Succeeded by: Christian Paradis

Senator from Quebec (Rougemont)
- In office February 27, 2006 – September 8, 2008
- Appointed by: Stephen Harper
- Preceded by: Shirley Maheu
- Succeeded by: Suzanne Fortin-Duplessis

Personal details
- Born: January 10, 1962 (age 64)
- Party: Conservative
- Spouse: Michelle Setlakwe
- Profession: Financier, lawyer

Michael M. Fortier (born January 10, 1962) is a Canadian investment banker, lawyer and former politician who was Minister of Public Works and Government Services from 2006 to 2008 and Minister of International Trade in 2008. A member of the Conservative Party, Fortier was appointed to the Senate of Canada in 2006 on the advice of Prime Minister Stephen Harper, before resigning as a senator to run as a member of Parliament (MP) in the 2008 federal election. He contested Vaudreuil—Soulanges, placing second.

== Business career ==
Before entering the Cabinet, Fortier was a partner at Ogilvy Renault, a leading Montreal law firm. One of his colleagues was Brian Mulroney. He specialized in securities, mergers and acquisitions. From 1992 to 1996, he managed Ogilvy Renault's office in London, England.

In 1999, he became the managing director and Senior Advisor (Eastern Canada) at Crédit Suisse First Boston. In 2004, Fortier became Corporate Financing Director (Quebec) for TD Securities. Two days after his appointment to Cabinet Montreal Gazette columnist Ian McDonald claimed that Fortier "was easily making $1 million a year running the Montreal office of TD Securities."

Fortier is Vice Chairman of RBC Capital Markets and is organizing a bid to bring an National Basketball Association team to Montreal.

== Political career ==
=== Early career ===
Fortier ran in the 1998 Progressive Conservative leadership election but came in last with 4% of the vote. Fortier was a Progressive Conservative candidate in the Montreal-area riding of Laval West during the 2000 federal election placing fourth. In 2003, he was co-chair of Harper's campaign to lead the new Conservative Party.

Fortier and veteran MP John Reynolds were the co-chairs of the Conservative campaign in the 2006 election.

=== Cabinet minister ===
Fortier was appointed to Cabinet as Minister of Public Works on 6 February 2006, the day Stephen Harper's minority government took office. In a cabinet reshuffle in June 2008, he shifted to the International Trade portfolio.

A financier and lawyer from Montreal, he had not been elected as a member of the House of Commons at the time he was appointed, nor was he a member of the Senate. Harper announced that Fortier would be appointed to the Senate, but would be expected to step down and run for a seat in the House of Commons at the next election.

On February 27, 2006, Fortier was formally summoned to the Senate. This practice is unusual in modern Canada, but there is precedent for such a practice: in 1979, former Prime Minister Joe Clark appointed Quebec Senator Jacques Flynn as Minister of Justice because of his lack of representation in that province.

In 1972, when Trudeau failed to win a single seat west of Manitoba, he appointed senators to cabinet as well. 19th century Prime Ministers John Abbott and Mackenzie Bowell served their entire terms in government as Senators.

Harper intended for Fortier to represent Montreal in Cabinet. No Montreal-area riding has elected a Conservative or any member of the party's predecessors—the Progressive Conservatives, the Canadian Alliance and the Reform Party—since 1988. Since then, right-of-centre candidates have rarely even competed in Montreal except in landslides.

As a former member of the Canadian Cabinet, he is a member of the Queen's Privy Council for Canada and thus has the right to the style The Honourable and the post-nominal designation PC for life. He is the brother of former Quebec Liberal Party MNA Margaret Delisle.

=== Controversy over Senate appointment ===
Fortier's appointment to Cabinet drew considerable controversy. The main charge was that Fortier's appointment was a significant departure from past Conservative policy. The Conservatives, and before them Reform and the Alliance, had strongly opposed Senate appointments and unelected Cabinet ministers while in opposition. Opponents of Fortier's appointment also note that in doing so, Harper broke a promise made on Radio-Canada television during the election campaign.

As a Senator, Fortier did not attend Question Period to respond to questions from the opposition parties in the House. His Parliamentary Secretaries, James Moore at Public Works and Gerald Keddy at International Trade, answered questions on his behalf. Fortier was subject to questioning in the Senate, but the Bloc Québécois and New Democratic Party were not represented in that body (One senator, Lillian Dyck, was appointed as an NDP Senator, but the NDP opposes the existence of the Senate and does not recognize her as part of its caucus.). The Department of Public Works was at the centre of the sponsorship scandal and spends billions of dollars per year, and the Conservatives singled the department out for criticism as an example of what they saw as a lack of accountability.

Fortier himself claimed he didn't run for a seat because "I didn't want to run in the election. I had a great career, five young kids, and so it wasn't the right situation for me to run when the election came around. That's just the simple truth."

In his blog, Andrew Coyne commented that "it is a fine thing for a Prime Minister elected on a platform of democratic accountability, who promised he would not appoint anyone who was not elected, either to cabinet or to the Senate, to then turn around and do both at one go." Jeffrey Simpson of The Globe and Mail wrote that "with breathtaking insouciance, Prime Minister Stephen Harper jettisoned, or at least delayed, his promise to only elect senators".

However, the Toronto Star's Chantal Hébert defended the appointments of Fortier and Emerson to Cabinet, arguing that the problem is with the first-past-the-post system which allows entire parts of the country (such as large cities) to be unrepresented in government. For example, the Conservatives were unable to win any seats in Toronto, Montreal and Vancouver in the last election, while the Liberals have only won four seats in Edmonton since 1968 and have only elected three MPs from Calgary since Alberta joined Confederation in 1905.

Michael Fortier was loudly booed at the opening ceremonies of the 2006 World Outgames, an LGBT sporting event and cultural festival held in Montreal. The Conservative senator's speech was interrupted as he attempted to welcome the estimated crowd of 40,000 at the Olympic Stadium that evening. Montreal Mayor Gérald Tremblay, who was greeted with sustained applause, intervened (unsuccessfully) to urge the crowd to listen "with respect" to the representative of the Canadian government.

=== Promise to seek election ===
On November 21, 2006, Fortier announced that he would seek election to the House of Commons in the riding of Vaudreuil-Soulanges in the next federal election, which he lost. The opposition parties pressured him to run in the by-election on November 27 in Repentigny. However, Fortier repeated his original promise to run in the next general election.

=== Fortier dismisses advisor connected to Julie Couillard ===
Fortier confirmed June 11, 2008 that he dismissed senior Quebec adviser Bernard Cote after learning that Cote briefly dated Julie Couillard last year while she was attempting to win a government contract. Cote had to resign because of a perceived conflict of interest, since Public Works was handling the building contracts Couillard was bidding on, Fortier said. Fortier told reporters that Cote, "should have actually recused himself from this matter, which he didn't do, hence his resignation." Couillard sparked the resignation of foreign minister Maxime Bernier in May 2008 when she went public with the fact her former paramour had forgotten classified NATO briefing documents at her Montreal home for more than a month.

=== 2008 federal election ===
While he chose not to run in an earlier by-election, Fortier was a candidate for the riding of Vaudreuil-Soulanges in the 2008 federal election, in fulfilment of his promise made at the time of his 2006 Senate appointment. In order to fulfill this promise, on September 8, 2008, he resigned from the Senate to run in the general election.

On election night, he was soundly defeated by popular Bloc Québécois incumbent Meili Faille, who captured 41.34% of the vote compared to Fortier's 23.69%.

== Electoral record ==
2008 Canadian federal election: Vaudreuil—Soulanges
Party	Candidate	Votes	%	±%	Expenditures
Bloc Québécois	Meili Faille	27,044	41.34	-1.82	$80,072
Conservative	Michael Fortier	15,496	23.69	+4.69	$87,967
Liberal	Brigitte Legault	13,954	21.33	-6.96	$32,958
New Democratic	Maxime Héroux-Legault	6,298	9.63	+4.09	$1,519
Green	Jean-Yves Massenet	2,625	4.01	+0.10	$1,913
Total valid votes/expense limit		65,417	100.00	$96,487	
Total rejected ballots		729	1.10		
Turnout		66,146	67.76		

== See also ==
- Université Laval

28th Canadian Ministry (2006–2015) – Cabinet of Stephen Harper
Cabinet posts (2)
Predecessor	Office	Successor
David Emerson	Minister of International Trade; 25 June 2008 – 29 October 2008	Stockwell Day
Scott Brison	Minister of Public Works and Government Services; 6 February 2006 – 25 June 2008	Christian Paradis
