= Canadian Alliance =

Federal political party (2000–2003)

Canadian Alliance Alliance canadienne
- Founded: March 27, 2000
- Dissolved: December 7, 2003
- Preceded by: Reform Party of Canada
- Merged into: Conservative Party of Canada
- Ideology: Conservatism; Social conservatism; Economic liberalism; Right-wing populism
- Political position: Centre-right to right-wing
- Colours: Teal

Website
- canadianalliance.ca (archived - October 30, 2002)

The Canadian Alliance (French: Alliance canadienne), formally the Canadian Reform Conservative Alliance (French: Alliance réformiste-conservatrice canadienne), was a centre-right to right-wing federal political party in Canada that existed under that name from 2000 to 2003. The Canadian Alliance was the new name of the Reform Party of Canada and inherited many of its populist policies, as well as its position as the Official Opposition in the House of Commons of Canada. The party supported policies that were both fiscally and socially conservative, seeking reduced government spending on social programs and reductions in taxation.

The Alliance resulted from the United Alternative initiative launched by the Reform Party of Canada and several provincial Tory parties as a vehicle to merge with the Progressive Conservative Party of Canada. The federal Progressive Conservative Party led by Joe Clark in the late fall of 1998 rejected the initiative to "unite the right." After the Alliance led by Stockwell Day was defeated and a third consecutive Liberal majority government was won in the 2000 federal election, talks reopened and in December 2003, the Canadian Alliance and the Progressive Conservative parties finally voted to merge into the Conservative Party of Canada.

== History ==
=== Background ===
The Canadian Alliance's origins were in the Reform Party of Canada, which was founded in 1987 as a right-wing populist party supporting Western Canadian interests. Led by its founder Preston Manning, the Reform Party rapidly gained momentum at the expense of the Progressive Conservative Party of Canada (PC); in the 1993 federal election, the PCs fell to only two seats while Reform surged to 52 seats, thus becoming Canada's largest right-wing party. However, the party was virtually nonexistent east of Manitoba. In the 1997 election, the PCs rebounded slightly to 20 seats while Reform again struggled outside of the west. The division among the right encouraged Manning to promote a new movement, the "United Alternative" (UA), to create a small-c conservative alternative to the Liberals. Manning blamed "conservative" vote-splitting for keeping the Liberal Party in power, although some polls showed that the Liberals were the second choice of many PC voters (especially in Ontario). Manning's efforts created a strong debate in the Reform Party, and he would even write a letter to the effect that he didn't want to lead Reform anymore, but would only lead the new party. The opposition died down after Manning won a leadership review with 74.6 per cent support at the January 2000 UA convention.

=== Foundation ===
In 2000, following the second of the two United Alternative conventions, the party voted to form a new party, the "Canadian Conservative Reform Alliance". After the convention, the Reform Party applied to change its name, short name, and logo; this application was granted by the Chief Electoral Officer of Canada, retroactive to March 27, 2000. As of that date, what used to be the Reform Party of Canada was used as a vehicle to adopt the new name, and re-registered as the Canadian Reform Conservative Alliance. The newly named party's platform was a mixture of the PC and Reform platforms. However, former Reform members dominated the new party — with few exceptions, the Reform caucus in the Commons essentially became the Alliance caucus. Brian Mulroney called the party "Reform in pantyhose", and some opponents referred to the party as the "Reform Alliance" to enforce this perception.

Media covering the convention quickly pointed out that if one added the word "Party" to the end of the party's name, the resulting initials were "CCRAP" (humorously pronounced "see-crap" or just "crap"); this was despite the fact that the Canadian Alliance never actually had the word party in its name. One day later, the party changed its official name to the "Canadian Reform Conservative Alliance". However, it was almost always called simply "the Canadian Alliance" (which was accepted on first reference in most media outlets) or "the Alliance". However, the "CCRAP" nickname was still used by its opponents. Deborah Grey, the deputy leader of Reform, was chosen as the new party's interim leader, becoming the first female leader of the Opposition in Canadian history. Subsequently, at the new party's first leadership convention, Manning was defeated by Stockwell Day, treasurer (finance minister) of Alberta. One Progressive Conservative senator, Gerry St. Germain, joined the new party in October 2000, becoming the Alliance's first (and, ultimately, only) member of the Senate.

=== 2000 federal election ===
In the fall of 2000, the Liberals called a snap election that caught the Alliance off-guard. Nonetheless, the party went into the election with great hopes, campaigning on tax cuts, an end to the federal gun registration program, and their vision of "family values". At one point, the Alliance was at 30.5 per cent in the polls; some thought they could win the election, or at least knock the Liberals down to a minority government.

Though disappointed with the election results in Ontario, the Alliance increased its presence to 66 MPs, including two MPs from Ontario. Nationally, the party increased its popular vote to 25 per cent. The Alliance remained the Official Opposition in the House of Commons. The Liberals increased their large majority mostly at the expense of the NDP, and the Tories under Joe Clark lost many seats and remained in fifth place, but Clark was elected in Calgary Centre in the middle of Alliance country, and the overall political landscape was not significantly changed. Like Reform, the Alliance was perceived mostly as a Western protest party.

=== Election aftermath ===
However, the Alliance's failure to win more seats east of Manitoba, along with residual resentments from the Alliance leadership contest and questions about Day's competence, led to caucus infighting. In the spring of 2001, eleven MPs who either voluntarily resigned or were expelled from the party formed the "Independent Alliance Caucus". The group was led by Chuck Strahl and included Grey. Day offered the dissidents an amnesty at the end of the summer, but seven of them, including Grey and Strahl, turned it down and formed their own parliamentary grouping, the Democratic Representative Caucus. The DRC formed a coalition with Clark's Tories in the House, which was widely seen as an attempt by Clark to reunite the Canadian right on his terms. The split forced Day to call a new leadership convention, and, in April 2002, former Reform MP Stephen Harper defeated Day at the subsequent leadership election.

Once Harper assumed the leadership, most of the rebellious MPs rejoined the Alliance. Two MPs did not rejoin, however: Inky Mark chose to remain outside of caucus, and eventually joined the Tories, and the scandal-plagued Jim Pankiw was rejected when he applied for readmission to the Alliance caucus.

=== Creation of the Conservative Party of Canada ===
On October 15, 2003, the Canadian Alliance and the Progressive Conservative Party (under its new leader Peter MacKay) announced that they would merge to form a new party, called the Conservative Party of Canada. The union was ratified on December 5, 2003, with 96 per cent support of the membership of the Canadian Alliance, and on December 6, 90.04 per cent support of elected delegates in the PC Party. On December 8, the party was registered with Elections Canada, and on March 20, 2004, former Alliance leader Stephen Harper was elected as leader of the party with MacKay serving as deputy leader. The new party was dubbed "the Alliance Conservatives" by critics who considered the new party a "hostile takeover" of the old Progressive Conservatives by the newer Alliance.

The new Conservative Party formed the Canadian government on February 6, 2006, and won two additional elections (2008 and 2011) under the leadership of Stephen Harper; of these, the 2006 and 2008 votes resulted in the party governing only as a minority; only in 2011 was a majority mandate achieved. The party was defeated in 2015, by the Liberals, and became the official opposition party in the House of Commons.

== Provincial wings ==
During its short history, the Canadian Alliance never seriously entertained the prospect of forming provincial wings or forging formal links with existing provincial parties. The vast majority of Alliance supporters in most provinces supported, and continued to support, their provincial Progressive Conservative parties, while most supporters in Saskatchewan remained loyal to the Saskatchewan Party and in BC supported the conservative BC Liberals.

However, an attempt to form a provincial party with clear, if unofficial, links with the Alliance was made in Alberta, where the Alberta Alliance was formed in 2002. Under the leadership of Reform/Alliance activist Randy Thorsteinson, the new party never sought a formal link with the Alliance, and if it had done so the overture would likely have been rebuffed since many Albertan Alliance members continued to support the Alberta Progressive Conservatives. However, the Alberta Alliance copied the colours of the Alliance and many of its logos bear a striking resemblance to those of the federal party. The Alberta Alliance continued to grow following the federal party's merger, and the provincial party fielded a full slate of candidates for the 2004 provincial election, on November 22, 2004, and won one seat in the Legislature.

== Party leaders ==
- Deborah Grey — March 27, 2000 – July 8, 2000 (interim)
- Stockwell Day — July 8, 2000 – December 11, 2001
- John Reynolds — December 11, 2001 – March 20, 2002 (interim)
- Stephen Harper — March 20, 2002 – December 7, 2003

== Electoral performance ==
=== House of Commons ===
Election	Leader	Votes	%	Seats	+/–	Position	Status
2000	Stockwell Day	3,276,929	25.49	66 / 301	▲6 (Note: Change from 1997 Reform Party result)	2nd	Opposition

== See also ==
- Canadian Alliance leadership elections
- Canadian Alliance candidates in the 2000 Canadian federal election
- List of political parties in Canada
- Politics of Canada

== Bibliography ==
- Harrison, Trevor. "Canadian Alliance." The Canadian Encyclopedia.
