= Pink Tory =

In Canadian politics, a Pink Tory is a pejorative term for a liberal member of one of the Conservative or Progressive Conservative parties, further to the left than a Red Tory. The term was often derisively applied to the 1971 to 1985 Ontario Progressive Conservative government of Bill Davis by critics on the right, particularly Toronto Sun columnist Claire Hoy. The term was used positively by Ron Dart to describe the political philosophy of Robert Stanfield in the 1968 election as a "sort of pink toryism". In 2002, Jim Flaherty described rival leadership contender Ernie Eves as a "pink" Tory.

== See also ==
- Red Tory
- Blue Grit
- Blue Tory
- High Tory
- Libertarian
- Limousine liberal
- Republican in Name Only
- Liberal conservatism
