= Conservatism in Canada =

Conservatism is a major political movement in Canada which is primarily represented by the modern-day Conservative Party of Canada in federal party politics, as well as various centre-right and right-wing parties at the provincial level. Far-right politics have never been a prominent force in Canadian society. The first party which called itself "Conservative" in what would become Canada was elected in the Province of Canada election of 1854.

Canadian conservative ideology has its origins in British Toryism, but over time has been influenced by American conservatism. Due to the resettlement of United Empire Loyalists after the American Revolutionary War with traditionalist conservative views alongside pro-market liberalism ideals, Canadian conservatives generally prefer the Westminster system of government.

Originally, Canadian conservatism tended to be Traditionalist. Conservative governments in Canada, such as those of John A. Macdonald, Robert Borden, R. B. Bennett, and John Diefenbaker, were known for supporting an active role for the government in the economy and the creation of government-operated businesses (early Crown Corporations such as the Canadian National Railway) to develop and protect Canadian industries, protectionist programs such as the National Policy. Canadian conservatism thus mirrored British Conservatism in its values and economic and political outlooks. Canadian conservatives have generally favored the continuation of old political institutions and the preservation of strong ties to the monarchy.

In the latter half of the 20th-century, Canadian conservatism embraced neoliberal economic policies which included free trade, the seeking of balanced budgets, and the support of the privatizations of Crown Corporations which were claimed to be better provided for by the private sector. During this time, division arose between the conservatives in Eastern and Western Canada because Western conservatives perceived Canada's federal parliament as being dominated by Eastern interests. This Western alienation led to the creation of the Reform Party of Canada as a Western-based populist protest party promoting constitutional reform to balance the regions' interests and sought to expand into the East—especially in Ontario—to displace the Progressive Conservative Party of Canada. While the PCs and Reform had some similar economic policies, Reformers wanted deeper cuts to government services than the PCs and Reformers had strong social conservative stances whereas the PCs were more neutral on controversial social issues.

The PCs faced an unprecedented collapse in the 1993 federal election and Reform surpassed the PCs as the largest conservative party in Canada's parliament. After several elections of neither party making significant gains, the two parties agreed to merge into the new Conservative Party of Canada in 2003. Meanwhile, although Quebec delivered few seats to conservative parties in federal elections from 1993 on, conservative themes were influential in Quebec provincial politics.

== Schools ==
=== Blue Tory ===
Blue Tories are Conservatives who are more free-market or liberal economically. Prior to the 1960s, these Conservatives were most identified with the Montreal and Toronto commercial elite who took positions of influence within the Progressive Conservative Party. Since the mid-1970s, they have been heavily influenced by the libertarian movement and the more individualist nature of American conservatism. Blue Tories tend to favour libertarian policies such as devolution of federal power to the provincial governments, a reduced role for government in the economy, reduction of taxation and similar mainstream market liberal ideals. The term Blue Tory does not refer to social conservatism.

One example of a Blue Tory administration in Canada was the 'Common Sense Revolution' provincial Progressive Conservative government of Ontario Premier Mike Harris. The Harris Tories were widely viewed as radical by Canadian standards in their economic policies and style of governance. Harris' government embarked on a number of initiatives, including cuts to education, welfare and Medicare, privatization of government services and health care, the sale of provincial highways and the forced amalgamation of municipalities. Provincial income taxes were also cut by 30% and corporate tax rates were nearly cut in half during the Harris mandate.

Most Blue Tories are at least somewhat ideologically aligned close to the economic libertarian positions of the former Canadian Alliance; as such, they supported the merger between the PCs and the Alliance to form the new federal Conservative Party of Canada (CPC). Some notable Blue Tories include many prominent federal and provincial Progressive Conservatives such as former PC Party Leader and Attorney General Peter MacKay, Conservative Party leadership contender and former Treasury Board President Tony Clement, former Premier of Ontario Mike Harris, and former CPC leader Andrew Scheer.

=== Red Tory ===
A Red Tory is an adherent of a centre-right or paternalistic-conservative political philosophy derived from the Tory tradition, predominantly in Canada, but also in the United Kingdom. This philosophy tends to favour communitarian social policies, while maintaining a degree of fiscal discipline and a respect of social and political order. It is contrasted with "Blue Tory" or "High Tory". Some Red Tories view themselves as small-c conservatives.

In Canada, Red Toryism is found in provincial and federal Conservative political parties. The history of Red Toryism marks differences in the development of the political cultures of Canada and the United States. Canadian conservatism and American conservatism have been different from each other in fundamental ways, including their stances on social issues and the role of government in society. The adjective "red" refers to the economically left-leaning nature of Red Toryism in comparison with Blue Toryism, since socialist and other leftist parties have traditionally used the colour red. The term reflects the broad ideological range traditionally found within conservatism in Canada.

Historically, Canadian conservatism has been derived from the Tory tradition, with a distinctive concern for a balance between individual rights and collectivism, as mediated through a traditional pre-industrial standard of morality – which has never been as evident in American conservatism. Red Toryism derives largely from a classical conservative tradition that maintained that the unequal division of wealth and political privilege among social classes can be justified if members of the privileged class practiced noblesse oblige and contributed to the common good. Red Tories supported traditional institutions such as religion and the monarchy, and maintenance of the social order. This position was later manifest in their support for some aspects of the welfare state. This belief in a common good, as expanded on in Colin Campbell and William Christian's Political Parties and Ideologies in Canada, is at the root of Red Toryism.

=== Libertarianism ===
Libertarianism as a political philosophy is not considered to be a primary force in Canadian conservatism. This philosophy is represented mainly by the Libertarian Party of Canada, People's Party of Canada, and other small provincial parties. These parties have never been successful in having members elected.

=== Social conservatism ===
While social conservatism exists throughout Canada, it is not as pronounced as it is in some other countries, such as the United States. It represents conservative positions on issues of culture, family, sexuality and morality. Despite the recent Conservative government having influential members who would be defined as social conservatives in its caucus, social conservatism is considered to have little influence on Canadian society and political policy. One of their notable wins was a 2014 neo-abolitionist law passed against prostitution, which banned buying services as well as third party involvement.

== History ==
The conservative movement in Canada evolved from relatively informal pre-Confederation political movements or parties, gradually coalescing into the Conservative Party of Canada. This party was the dominant political force in Canadian politics from 1867 to 1935. Thereafter, the party (renamed the Progressive Conservative Party of Canada in 1945) spent more time in opposition than in government.

During the twentieth century rival "small-c conservative" movements appeared, most notably the federal Social Credit and Reform parties. Conservatism was divided (especially by region) until the merger of the Progressive Conservatives and the Canadian Alliance (the direct successor to the Reform Party) in 2003.

=== Pre-Confederation ===
In the early days of electoral politics in Canada, the term conservatives or Tories applied to those people who supported the authority of colonial governors and their advisers over the elected assemblies. These conservatives took their cues from British Tories, especially Burke. They supported royal privilege, and were avowedly anti-democratic. Tory supporters were often descended from loyalists who had fled the United States during the American Revolution and War of Independence. They were wary of emulating the US's "mob rule" and preferred a strong role for traditional elites such as landowners and Christianity in politics.

Many were Anglicans who supported keeping the Anglican Church of Canada as Canada's established church. In each colony, Tories contested elections as the personal party of the governor. Business elites who surrounded the governor also hoped to gain patronage. In Upper Canada this was the Family Compact, in Lower Canada the Chateau Clique. Opposition to the rule of these oligarchies resulted in the Rebellions of 1837. After the rebellions, Lord Durham (a Whig or liberal) issued his Report on the Affairs of British North America, a report to the British government that recommended that most powers in colonial governments be given from the governor to the elected assemblies. This new arrangement, called responsible government, mirrored earlier changes that had occurred in Britain.

==== Responsible government ====
After the failure of radical liberalism during the Rebellions of 1837, a new set of moderate liberals, led by Robert Baldwin in Canada West, Louis-Hippolyte Lafontaine in Canada East and Joseph Howe in Nova Scotia rose to prominence. They campaigned for and won responsible government by creating broad coalitions that took in liberals, moderates, and conservatives.

The only way for conservatives as a party to regroup was to accept the consequences of responsible government. They abandoned the idea of being the governor's party and embraced mass politics. At the same time the coalition that had won responsible government began to break up in the 1850s. This presented an opening for more moderate conservatives such as John A. Macdonald and George-Étienne Cartier to claim the political centre. Their coalition dominated politics in the United Province of Canada, and when joined by liberal George Brown, provided the broad support necessary to negotiate Confederation with the Maritime Provinces.

=== Post-Confederation ===
==== Macdonald-Cartier era ====
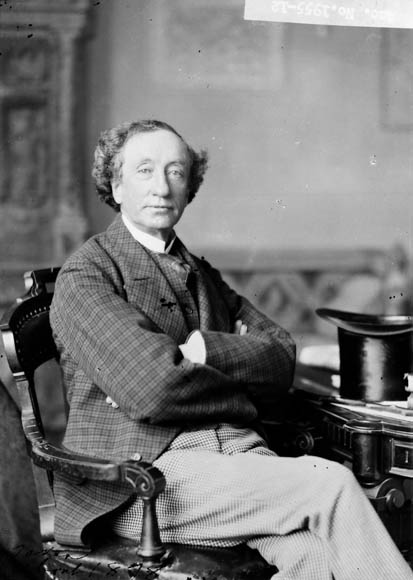
John A. Macdonald shortly after his win in the 1878 election

The MacDonald-Cartier coalition's prestige was only strengthened by the creation of the new Canadian Confederation in 1867. Their coalition dominated the early politics of the new state. Their "National Policy" of high tariffs against the United States, and intense railway building, became the basis of a political dynasty that dominated Canadian politics from Confederation until Macdonald's death in office in 1891. The greatest strain in this coalition came during the Riel rebellions of 1869 and 1885, which inflamed French-English and Protestant-Catholic tensions in the country. After Macdonald's death, the coalition faltered.

==== Interregnum ====
The death of Macdonald left a large power vacuum in the Conservative Party, leading to the short tenure of John Abbott, who was the Protestant compromise choice. Abbott's government collapsed when his cabinet walked out on him, forcing him to resign and allowing for the selection of the first Catholic prime minister of Canada, John Sparrow Thompson. At just 45, he was expected to become the successor to Macdonald's legacy, but after only a year in office he died from a stroke. Two more short-serving Conservatives, Mackenzie Bowell and Charles Tupper, served out the end of the Conservative government, until the election in 1896 when the coalition of French and English Canadians fell apart and Sir Wilfrid Laurier became the second Liberal prime minister of Canada. The Liberals would dominate for the next fourteen years until the emergence of Robert Borden.

=== World War and Depression ===
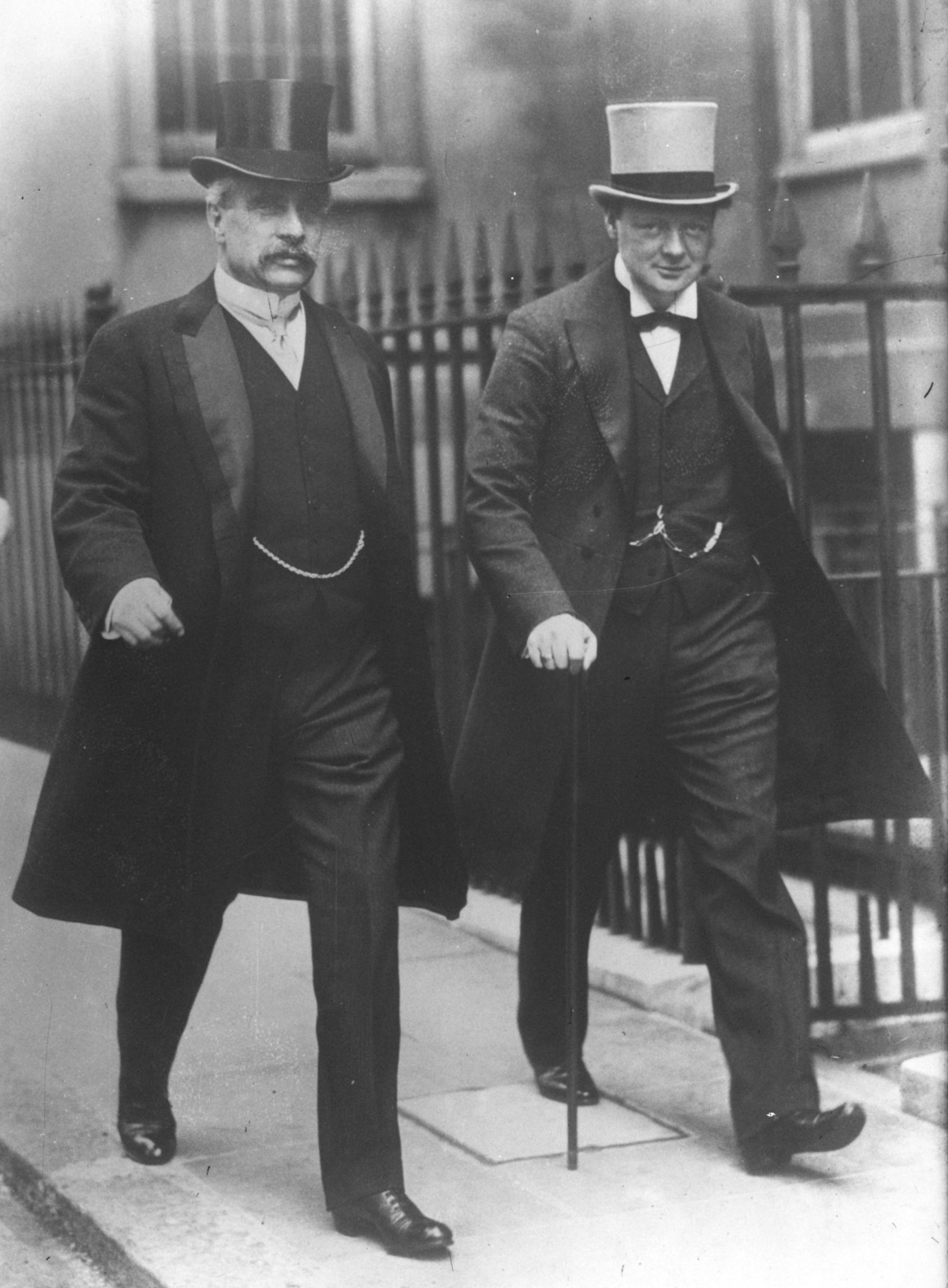
Robert Borden and Winston Churchill in 1912

Robert Borden's Conservative government led Canada into the First World War, with the Laurier-led Liberal in opposition. The government wanted to introduce conscription, and sought a coalition to pursue this policy. Most English-speaking Liberals joined the Tories to form a coalition called "Unionist" with the mostly-French speaking Liberal rump in opposition. After the war this coalition, now led by Arthur Meighen could not govern with a stable majority. In the 1921 election the Conservatives were relegated to third place, at the expense of the new Progressive movement based mostly in the Prairie West (see Western alienation).

Once the Progressive movement had largely been subsumed into the Liberal Party of Canada, the Conservatives were once again in opposition, until the election of 1930, under the leadership of R. B. Bennett. But in the 1935 election the Conservatives were handed a major defeat by the Liberals, with a new right-wing party, Social Credit, placing a close third, again on the strength of Western alienation.

==== Post-War ====
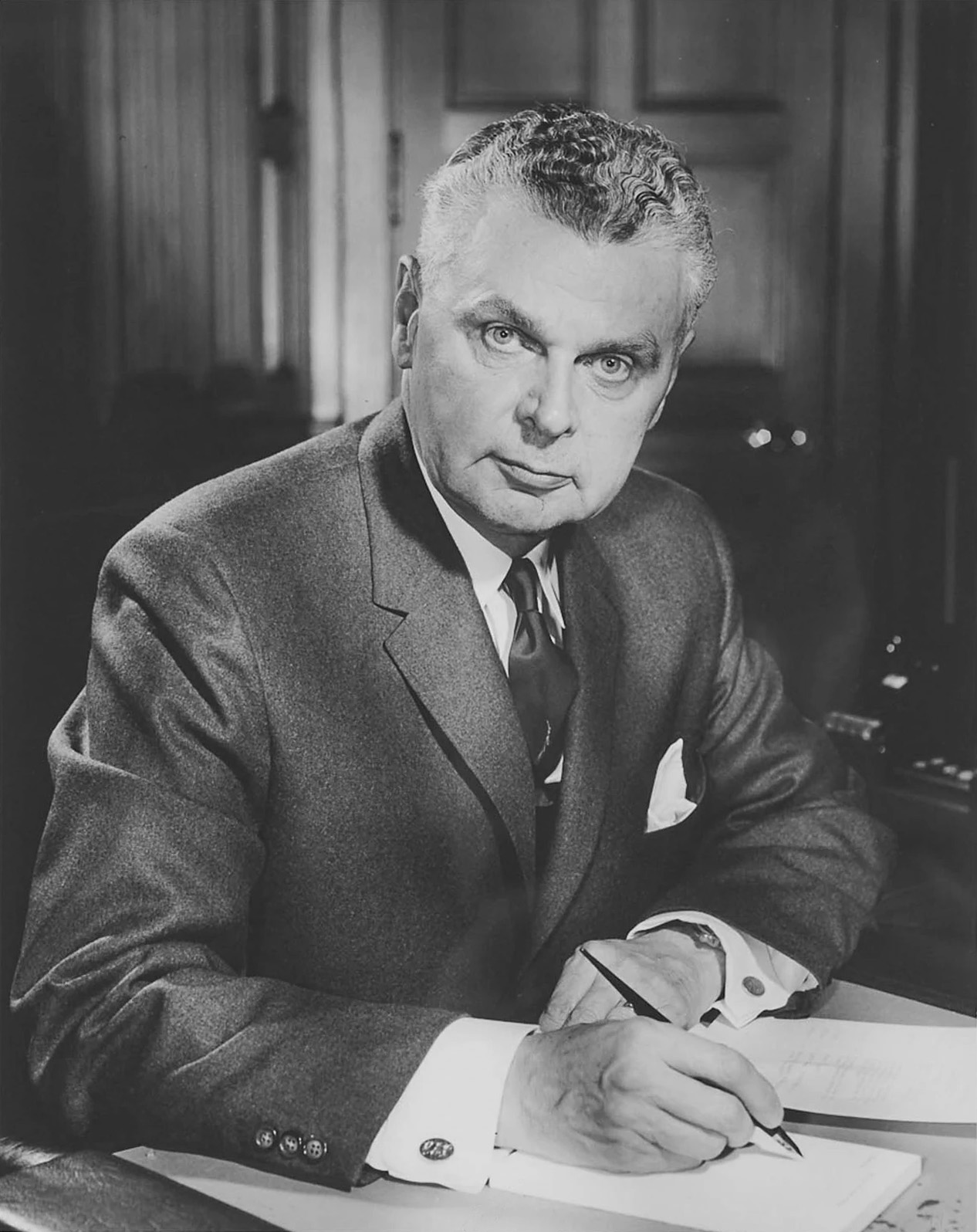
Progressive Conservative Prime Minister John Diefenbaker who served from 1957 to 1963.

Throughout most of the last century, the Progressive Conservative Party (often abbreviated PC) dominated conservative politics at the federal level and in most provinces. Canada had many conservative Prime Ministers in the past, but the first to be elected under the Progressive Conservative banner was John Diefenbaker, who served from 1957 to 1963.

During the late 1970s and early 1980s, with the rise of Conservative politicians in Canada such as Ralph Klein, Don Getty, Brian Mulroney, Preston Manning, Mike Harris and others, the objectives and values of Conservatives in Canada began to mimic those of fiscal conservatives in both the US and UK. With the rise in inflation and a large budgetary deficit in Canada from the Trudeau government, emphasis was put on "shrinking the size of government" (in part, through privatization), pursuing continental trade arrangements (free trade, creating tax incentives and cutting "government waste").

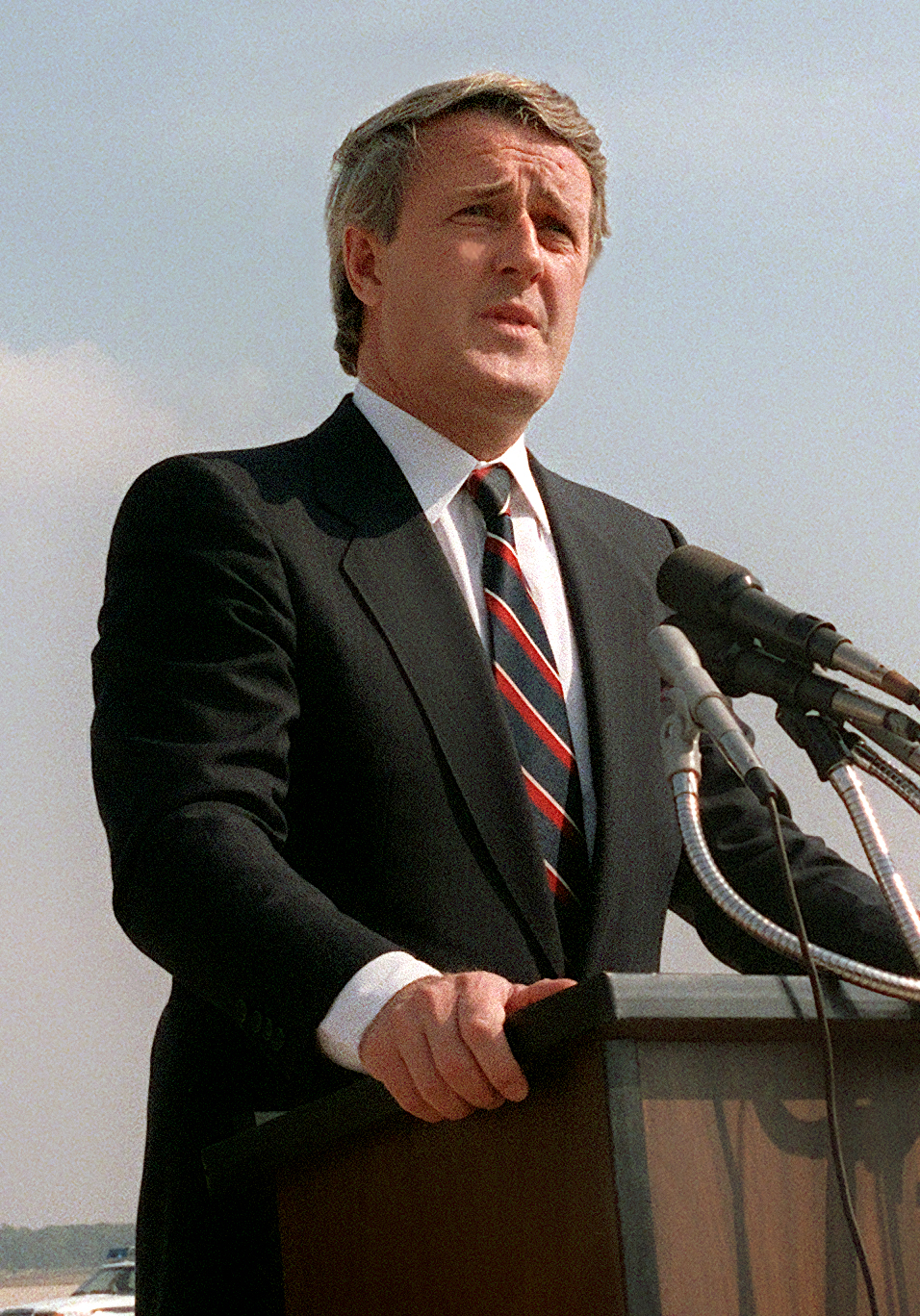
Progressive Conservative Prime Minister Brian Mulroney.

Joe Clark became Prime Minister with a minority government in 1979, but lost to a non-confidence vote after only nine months, and the Liberals again took power. After Pierre Trudeau's retirement in 1984, his successor, John Turner, called a federal election, which was won in a landslide by the PCs under Brian Mulroney. Mulroney succeeded by uniting conservatives from Western Canada with those from Quebec. During his tenure, the government unsuccessfully attempted to negotiate the status of Quebec through the failed Meech Lake and Charlottetown Accords.

During the government of Brian Mulroney (1984–1993), government spending on social programs was cut, taxes for individuals and businesses were reduced (but a new national tax appeared for nearly all goods and services), government intervention in the economy was significantly reduced, a free trade agreement was concluded with the United States, and Crown Corporations such as Teleglobe, Petro-Canada and Air Canada (some created by previous Conservative governments) were sold to both domestic and foreign private buyers (privatized). However, due to the failure of the Mulroney government to balance the budget and service debt, the federal debt continued to rise. It was not until the end of Mulroney's administration and the beginning of Jean Chrétien's Liberal government that the government's program of spending finally halted the growth in the federal debt.

The government's willingness to affirm Quebec's demands for recognition as a distinct society was seen as a betrayal by many westerners as well as angering Canadian Nationalists mostly from Ontario. The Reform Party of Canada was founded on a strongly right-wing populist conservative platform as an alternative voice for these western conservatives.

The Progressive Conservative Party lost a large base of its support toward the end of the Mulroney era. Brian Mulroney's failed attempts to reform the Canadian Constitution with the Meech Lake and Charlottetown Accords, and the introduction of the Goods and Services Tax lost him most of his support.

Following Mulroney's resignation in 1993 and Kim Campbell's brief tenure, the Conservatives were reduced to only two seats in Parliament in the 1993 federal election. The Liberal Party was elected with a strong majority and the Reform Party gradually replaced the Tories as the major right-wing party in Canada. The Reform Party under Preston Manning would become the Official Opposition from 1997 to 2000.

Throughout the 1990s, many social conservatives and Blue Tories in the PC Party began to drift slowly to the Reform Party and then in droves to the Reform Party's direct successor, the Canadian Alliance. This left the PC Party under the control of the moderate Red Tory faction. Despite taking what they believed to be more popular socially progressive approaches on certain issues, the PCs significantly fell in the popular vote from the 1997 to 2000 federal elections and were not able to greatly increase their representation in the House of Commons. The Reform Party and then the Canadian Alliance dominated the opposition benches.

Support for both the Reform Party and the Progressive Conservatives was negligible in Quebec until the 2006 federal election, where the renewed Conservative party won 10 seats in Quebec. In the west, the Reform Party took most of the PC Party's former seats, but held much more socially or economically conservative views than the old party on most subjects (regarding, for example, homosexuality, religion in public life, gun control, and government intervention in the economy).

The PCs retained moderate support in the Atlantic Provinces, would manage to regain a few seats. They also retained scattered support across the country. The result was that neither new party managed to approach the success of the Progressive Conservatives prior to 1993. In many ridings the conservative vote was split, letting other parties win: the Liberal Party under Jean Chrétien won three successive majority governments starting in 1993. During this period, either the Bloc Québécois or the Reform Party were the Official Opposition.

After the 1997 federal election some members of the Reform Party tried to end the vote splitting by merging the two parties. A new party was formed, called the Canadian Alliance, and Stockwell Day was elected its leader. However, many PCs resisted the move, suspecting that Reform Party ideology would dominate the new party, and the new party garnered only a little more support than its predecessor. Meanwhile, the PC Party re-elected Joe Clark as their leader and attempted to regain lost ground.

Day's tenure was marked by a number of public gaffes and apparent publicity stunts, and he was widely portrayed as incompetent and ignorant. Several MPs left his party in 2002.

In 2003, when former Prime Minister Joe Clark retired after being brought back to improve the PC party's standings, Peter MacKay was chosen in a leadership contest to replace him. MacKay immediately created controversy within the party by entering into negotiations with Canadian Alliance leader Stephen Harper to merge the two parties. MacKay had been elected on a third ballot of the party's leadership convention as a result of an agreement that he signed with another leadership contestant, David Orchard, in which he promised never to merge the PC Party with the Alliance.

Later on that year, the Progressive Conservative Party, which dated back to 1854 (though existing under many different names), merged with the Canadian Alliance. 96% of the Alliance's membership and 92% of the PC Party's riding representatives approved the merger. The contemporary Conservative Party of Canada was then created, and, in 2004, Stephen Harper was elected leader. Dissident Red Tories opposed to the merger would go on to form the minor Progressive Canadian Party. Under Stephen Harper, the platform of the Conservative Party emphasized the Blue Tory policies of fiscal restraint, increases in military spending, tax cuts and Senate Reform. The Harper-led Conservative Party has, however, come under fire, with many accusing them of adopting neoconservative policies.

Yoram Hazony, a scholar on the history and ideology of conservatism, identified Canadian psychologist Jordan Peterson as the most significant conservative thinker to appear in the English-speaking world in a generation.

=== The Harper Conservatives ===
==== Foreign policy ====
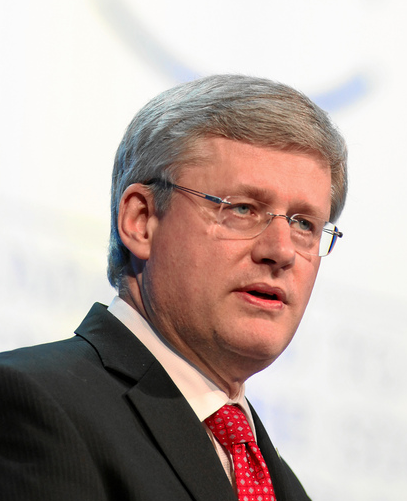
Prime Minister Stephen Harper in 2012

While in Opposition, Stephen Harper voted in favour of Canadian military involvement in the US-led 2003 invasion of Iraq; he later admitted this had been a mistake. Conservative Party member resolutions express strong support for the state of Israel and Kingdom of Saudi Arabia. Harper also took aggressive action against perceived sponsors of terrorism such as Iran, closing the Canadian embassy and expelling the Iranian diplomats in 2012.

===== Refugees and deportations of Iraq War resisters =====
In 2012, the Conservative government introduced reforms to the Immigration and Refugee Protection Act which limited refugee claims from those on a list of designated countries of origin, those considered safe by Canada for most persons. Other changes allowed for detention of mass arrivals, following the MV Sun Sea incident. These changes cleared an immigration backlog that had persisted for many years under the previous Liberal government, reducing the processing time from over 1000 days to less than two months.

All 110 Conservative Party MPs voted against an opposition motion concerning conscientious objectors and the introduction of programs to allow objectors to seek refuge in Canada. On 13 September 2008, this refusal to set up a special program was reiterated by a Conservative Party spokeswoman after the first such conscientious objector (Robin Long) had been deported and sentenced to 15 months in jail. (See Canada and Iraq War resisters for details about two motions in Parliament concerning Canada and Iraq War resisters.)

===== China =====
Consistent in all recent Canadian governments is strong ties to China. In 2013, the Conservative administration approved the acquisition of Nexen by a Chinese firm. It also advanced, as of 2013, FIPA agreement, containing guarantees that Chinese buyer would have the legal right to sue Canada in private settlement of inhibition to its activities by that government (including provincial or municipal for whom the federal government would be liable). The actual extent or limit of these powers would not be publicly known and settlements would be private, in effect a "confidential lawsuit", for instance a future BC or Canadian government reversing a federal approval of the Northern Gateway pipeline. The move received criticism from many quarters, including the often supportive Financial Post and is the subject of a current lawsuit.

In other respects, Conservative MPs have sometimes been sharply critical of China, particularly over human rights policies and especially treatment of the Falun Gong. These positions are not materially different from those of other parties.

==== Parliamentary democracy ====
Prior to winning election, Stephen Harper openly favoured the alternative vote method of selecting both MPs and Senators.

As the successor of the Western Canada-based Canadian Alliance (formerly the Reform Party of Canada), the party supported reform of the Senate to make it "elected, equal, and effective" (the "Triple-E Senate"). However, party leader Stephen Harper advised the Governor General to appoint the unelected Michael Fortier to both the Senate and to the Cabinet on 6 February 2006, the day his minority government took office. On 22 December 2008, Prime Minister Harper asked the Governor General to fill all eighteen Senate seats that had been vacant at the time. It was earlier reported in The Toronto Star that this action was "to kill any chance of a Liberal-NDP coalition government filling the vacancies next year".

The party introduced a bill in the parliament to have fixed dates for elections and, with the support of the Liberal Party, passed it. However, Ned Franks, a Canadian parliamentary expert, maintains that the Prime Minister still has the right to advise the Governor-General to dissolve the parliament early and drop the writs for an election.

===== Transparency and accountability =====
In 2006, the Conservatives campaigned strongly against Liberal abuses in the Sponsorship scandal and vowed to introduce several accountability measures that would hold even a majority government to account. These included a Parliamentary Budget Office whose first head Kevin Page found himself often sharply at odds with Harper government policy and issued several reports scathing of Conservative practices, even sometimes being described as the "sharpest thorn in Harper's side". Major media commentators often use Page's reports as a starting point for general criticisms of Harper's budgetary and transparency practices, including comedic rants.

While other accountability officers have been similarly ignored or critical, the influence and neutrality of the persons who were appointed, and the general public trust of their opinions, seems to be an indication of success on long-term transparency. The office is likely to continue under future administrations and be quite difficult to eliminate or ignore.

By contrast, agency discipline and appointments to the Canadian Senate have tended to reflect a more cynical view that parties in power tend to forget transparency and accountability promises made when out of power.

==== Domestic issues ====
In its founding documents, the Conservative Party avowed principles of lower taxes, smaller government, more decentralization of federal government powers to the provinces, modeled after the Meech Lake Accord, traditional religious and cultural values and has in practice strongly supported Oil Sands and other controversial energy projects. The Party has also both avowed and introduced legislation to reduce some gun controls and some MPs openly favour the death penalty.

===== Abortion =====
The current Conservative government position on abortion is that a debate on abortion legislation will not take place in Parliament. Former party leader Stephen Harper stated that "As long as I'm prime minister we are not reopening the abortion debate".

The appointment of Dr. Henry Morgentaler, an abortion-rights activist, to the prestigious Order of Canada, was deplored by some Conservative MPs. The Conservative government distanced itself from the award.

The Conservative government excluded the funding of abortions in Canada's G8 health plan. Harper argued that he wanted to focus on non-divisive policies. This stance was opposed by the Liberals, NDP and international health and women's groups. The Archbishop of Quebec and Primate of Canada, Marc Ouellet, praised this decision, but urged Harper to do more "in defence of the unborn". In May 2010, 18 Conservative MPs addressed thousands of students at the anti-abortion 13th annual March for Life rally on Parliament Hill.

===== Same-sex marriage =====
Former party leader Stephen Harper has repeatedly stated that his government will not attempt to ban same-sex marriage in Canada. Same-sex marriage was recognized nationwide in Canada in 2005 with the Civil Marriage Act. Harper most recently restated this commitment after news broke that a lawyer with the federal Justice Department was of the opinion that foreign same-sex couples visiting Canada to get married who are from regions where same-sex marriage is illegal were not obligated to get divorced in Canada since their marriage in their home region was never legitimate. Harper corrected the record and restated that his government will not legislate nor attempt to legislate same-sex marriage. However, the Conservative Party of Canada's Policy Declaration states, "We support legislation defining marriage as the union of one man and one woman". This was repealed by the party at their convention in 2016.

The party had a free vote on whether the House wanted to reopen the issue of same-sex marriage, which was defeated. In March 2011, just ahead of the expected Canadian election, the Conservatives added one line about gay rights to the "Discover Canada" booklet for new immigrants which they had published in 2009: "Canada's diversity includes gay and lesbian Canadians, who enjoy the full protection of an equal treatment under the law, including access to civil marriage". The Minister of Citizenship, Immigration, and Multiculturalism, Jason Kenney, had previously removed mention of gay rights from the booklet published in 2009.

===== Crime and law enforcement =====
Before the majority was achieved in 2011, Conservatives promised to re-introduce Internet surveillance legislation that they were not able to pass, bundling it with the rest of their crime bills. They said they plan to fast track the legislation within 100 days after taking office. The Internet surveillance bill was later scrapped by the Conservatives and not put into law.

===== Gun control =====
While the gun rights issue is not as pronounced by Canadian conservative groups as it is by Americans, it has recently received much attention and politicizing in the recent years. One of the biggest accomplishments of the Conservative Party was the passage of Bill C-19 in 2012, which abolished the long gun registry that was introduced by Liberal prime minister Jean Chrétien in 1993. This resulted in the mandatory destruction of records of people owning non-restricted firearms (shotguns and bolt-action rifles), except for the province of Quebec, where the bill is still being challenged and contested. This had been a long-standing goal and premise of the Conservative Party, and a defeat for gun control activists in Canada.

In September 2014, Stephen Harper showed opposition to an RCMP ban of the Swiss Arms Classic Green Carbine, assuring to protect owners of the rifle from prosecution. He also stated that he supports the use of firearms for self-defense in rural areas where police protection isn't sufficient, as self-defense isn't considered a valid reason for attaining a firearms license. However, in spite of these pro-gun moves, Stephen Harper stated that he had no intention to promote an American-style vigilantism in Canada.

In October 2014, the Public Safety Minister Stephen Blaney proposed Bill C-42, or the Common Sense Firearms Licensing Act which would ease the restrictions on gun owners but implement mandatory training courses for first-time owners. This proposed bill would allow easier transportation of firearms to a shooting range without having to notify a Chief Firearms Officer and ease the licensing process. This would also lift the ban on the Swiss Arms Classic Green Carbine, and allow the prime minister to override decisions made by the RCMP. Harper stated his support of these laws as well as the support for use of guns for self-defense in rural Canada, which drew immense criticisms from supporters of gun control and Liberal politicians. However, Harper rejected these claims, stating that police services are insufficient in rural areas, and that guns were a "responsibility" in Canada and not a right as in the United States.

The bill passed a House of Commons reading. However, the bill has received criticisms from both gun rights and gun control advocates, with each claiming that the bill serves the opposites' agenda. Leaders of opposition parties also criticize the bill as merely a political tool used by the Conservative Party to gain votes. The law took effect on September 2, 2015.

== Conservatism in Western Canada ==
The four Western Canada provinces of British Columbia, Alberta, Saskatchewan, and Manitoba have long been a hotbed for protest politics and political parties of the left and right. All four provinces have strong rural and Christian constituencies, leading to an active presence of the Christian right. Historically, the heavy presence of agriculture led to the emergence in the past of large left-leaning, agrarian farmer's based protest movements such as the Progressive Party of Canada and the United Farmers of Canada which supported free trade with the United States and increased social benefits. These movements were later absorbed by the Liberal Party of Canada, the Conservative Party of Canada (who became the progressive conservatives) and the Co-operative Commonwealth Federation (CCF).

During the Great Depression, two radical protest movements appeared: the CCF in Saskatchewan advocated progressive social policies and reformist democratic socialism; while in Alberta, the Social Credit Party of Alberta formed a provincial government that favoured evangelical Christian conservatism, provincial control over natural resources, limited government intervention in the economy and a radical philosophy known as Social Credit based on providing dividends to the population to support small businesses and free enterprise.

Provincial Social Credit parties went on to dominate the government of Alberta from 1934 to 1971 and British Columbia from 1951 to 1972 and 1975–1991. However, unlike the CCF, which morphed into the social-democratic New Democratic Party, the Social Credit Party would die out. Their popularity grew in Quebec, leading to Western supporters of Social Credit feeling isolated by the federal party's Quebec nationalism. The provincial Social Credit governments of British Columbia and Alberta would abandon Social Credit economic policies and followed staunchly conservative policies while maintaining ties with the federal Progressive Conservative Party of Canada as opposed to the federal Social Credit Party of Canada.

In British Columbia, the BC Social Credit Party was replaced as the party of the centre-right by the British Columbia Liberal Party, and in Alberta the Alberta Social Credit Party were completely annihilated by the more moderate Alberta Progressive Conservative Party, leaving both parties as marginal political forces. In the 1980 federal election, the Social Credit Party of Canada lost all of its remaining seats and was forced to disband in 1989. Most of its Western members moved onto the ideologically similar Reform Party of Canada, founded by Preston Manning, the son of Alberta's former Social Credit premier, Ernest Manning.

The Reform Party grew out of the province of Alberta and was fed by dissatisfaction with the federal Progressive Conservative government of Brian Mulroney. Right-wing Westerners felt that Mulroney's liberal economic policies did not go nearly far enough, that his government was overly favourable toward the more populous provinces of Quebec and Ontario, that his policies on social issues such as abortion and the death penalty were too liberal, and that, like the Liberal Party of Canada, the Progressive Conservatives had allegedly come to not take Western Canada demands for provincial economic autonomy seriously enough.

Though for most of the 1990s, the Tories enjoyed roughly the same electoral support as the Reform Party due to Canada's first-past-the-post system of elected representatives to the House of Commons, Reform dominated the position of Official Opposition. In 2000, the Reform Party was dissolved and joined by some right-wing members of the PC Party to create the Canadian Alliance, formally known as the Canadian Reform Conservative Alliance; however, this new enlarged party was unable to win many ridings east of Manitoba except for two in Ontario and was dissolved in 2003, merging with the Progressive Conservative Party of Canada to create the contemporary Conservative Party of Canada. This party, led by former Canadian Alliance leader Stephen Harper, won a minority government in the 2006 federal election, with 36% of the vote and 124 seats in the House of Commons out of 308.

In Alberta, the Progressive Conservative dominated the government from 1971 to 2015, following slightly right-wing policies under premiers Peter Lougheed, Don Getty, Ralph Klein, Ed Stelmach and Alison Redford. Following the election of the Alberta New Democratic Party and Rachel Notley in 2015, efforts began to 'unite the right' with Jason Kenney elected as PC Leader. Kenney oversaw merger negotiations with Wildrose Party leader Brian Jean, culminating in ratification votes in July 2017 as the United Conservative Party, which elected Kenney leader in October 2017. In BC, the British Columbia Liberal Party (BC Liberals) have taken a rightward economic turn under Premier Gordon Campbell in competing with the centre-left British Columbia New Democratic Party (BC NDP) to govern the province, filling the gap left by the electoral collapse of the BC Social Credit Party in 1991. After the collapse of the Liberals under the name BC United, the more right-wing Conservative Party of British Columbia became the BC NDP's primary challenger following the 2024 election. In Saskatchewan, the center-right Saskatchewan Party formed its first government in 2007 after many years of Saskatchewan NDP rule. In Manitoba, the Progressive Conservative Party, led by Brian Pallister won a landslide majority government in the 2016 election, defeating incumbent Premier Greg Selinger and the 16-year reigning NDP government.

== Canadian conservative parties ==
=== Represented in Parliament ===
- Conservative Party of Canada

=== Not represented in Parliament ===
- Christian Heritage Party
- People's Party of Canada

=== Provincial ===
- United Conservative Party of Alberta
- Progressive Tory Party of Alberta
- BC United
- British Columbia Conservative Party
- Progressive Conservative Party of Manitoba
- Progressive Conservative Party of New Brunswick
- Progressive Conservative Party of Newfoundland and Labrador
- Progressive Conservative Party of Nova Scotia
- Progressive Conservative Party of Ontario
- Progressive Conservative Party of Prince Edward Island
- Coalition Avenir Québec
- Conservative Party of Quebec
- Saskatchewan Party
- Saskatchewan United Party
- Progressive Conservative Party of Saskatchewan
- Yukon Party

The Quebec Liberal Party, a big tent federalist party, was often described as centre-right from the 1980s to 2010s, and it has been the closest to conservative major party in some Quebec provincial elections.

=== Historical ===
- Anti-Confederation Party
- Canadian Alliance
- Conservative Party of Quebec
- Social Credit Party of Canada
- British Columbia Social Credit Party
- Reform Party of British Columbia
- British Columbia Unity Party
- British Columbia Progressive Conservative Party
- Alberta Social Credit Party
- Representative Party of Alberta
- Alberta Alliance Party
- Alberta Party
- Alberta First Party
- Progressive Conservative Association of Alberta
- Wildrose Party
- Manitoba Party
- Union Nationale
- Ralliement créditiste
- Ralliement créditiste du Québec
- Reform Party of Canada
- Progressive Conservative Party of Saskatchewan

=== Largest ===
- Upper Canada Tories before 1854 in Upper Canada / Canada West
- Parti bleu in Lower Canada / Canada East
- Liberal - Conservative Party 1854–1873
- Conservative Party of Canada 1873–1917
- Unionist Party of Canada 1917–1920
- National Liberal and Conservative Party 1920–1921
- Conservative Party of Canada 1921–1940
- National Government (Canada) 1940
- Conservative Party of Canada 1940–1942
- Progressive Conservative Party of Canada 1942–1993
- Reform Party of Canada 1993–2000
- Canadian Alliance 2000–2003
- Conservative Party of Canada 2003–present

== Conservative prime ministers ==
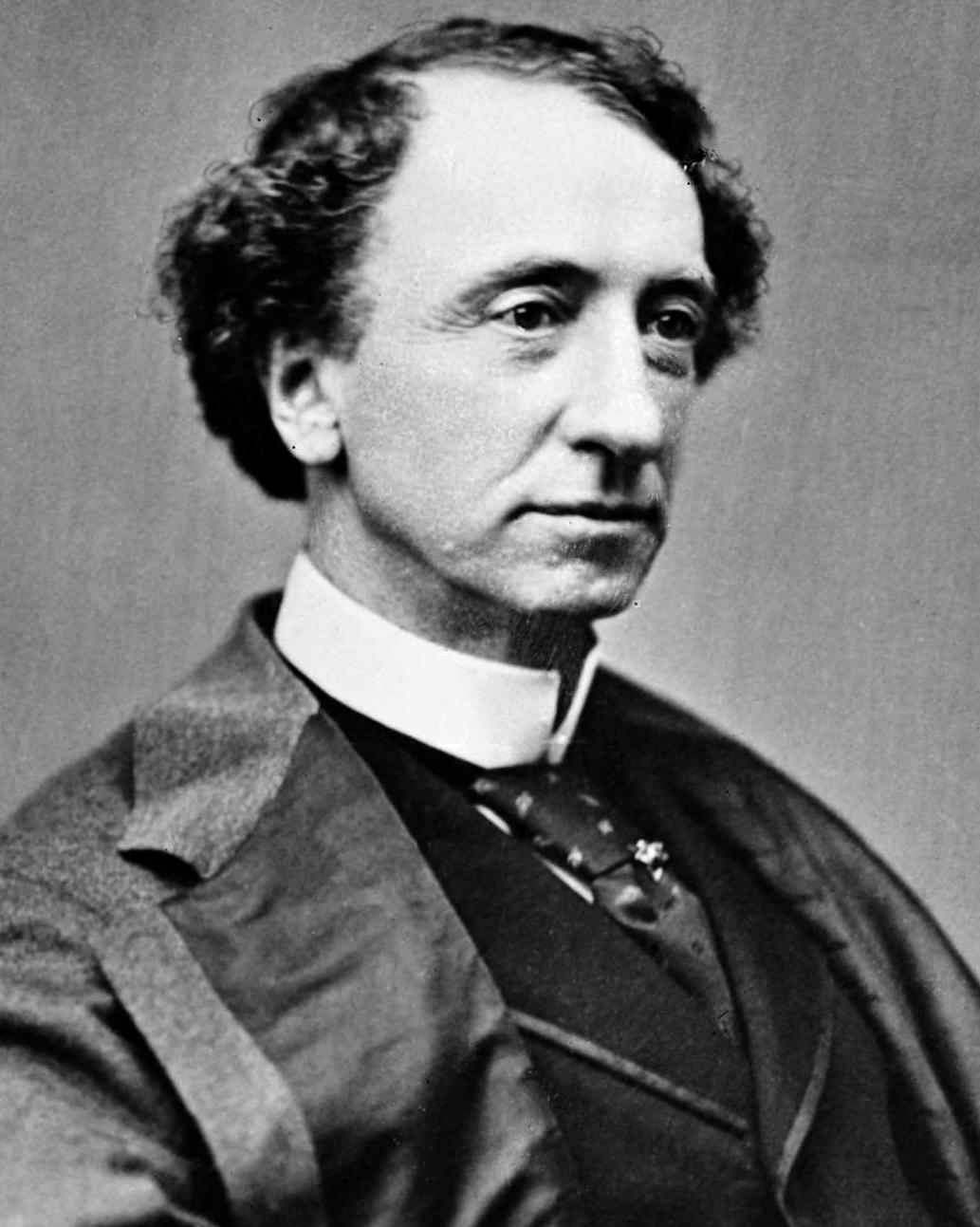
Sir John A. Macdonald, first Tory Prime Minister (1867)

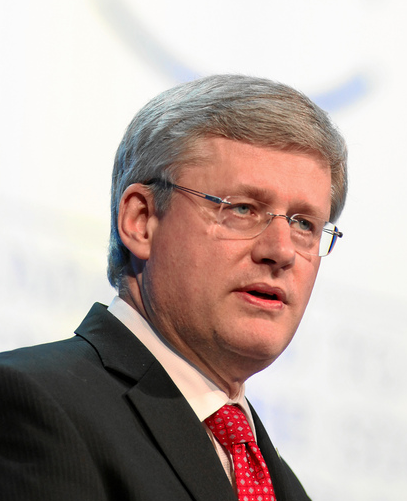
Stephen Harper, most recent Tory Prime Minister (2015)

- Sir John A. Macdonald 1867–1873, 1878–1891 Liberal Conservative/Conservative
- Sir John Abbott 1891–1892 Conservative
- Sir John Thompson 1892–1894 Conservative
- Sir Mackenzie Bowell 1894–1896 Conservative
- Sir Charles Tupper 1896 Conservative
- Sir Robert Borden: Conservative/Unionist, 1911–1920
- Arthur Meighen: Conservative, 1920–1921, 1926
- Richard Bennett: Conservative, 1930–1935
- John Diefenbaker: Progressive Conservative, 1957–1963
- Joe Clark: Progressive Conservative, 1979–1980
- Brian Mulroney: Progressive Conservative, 1984–1993
- Kim Campbell: Progressive Conservative, 1993
- Stephen Harper: Conservative, 2006–2015

== See also ==
- Social conservatism in Canada
- Anarchism in Canada
- Conservatism in North America
- Jewish conservatism
- Fascism in Canada
- Liberalism in Canada
- Monarchism in Canada
- Populism in Canada
- Republicanism in Canada
- Socialism in Canada
