= Blue Grit =

Term for centre-right Canadian liberals

A Blue Grit, also known as a blue Liberal or a business Liberal, is a member or supporter of the Liberal Party of Canada or of one of the nation's provincial and territorial Liberal parties who is generally considered to be centre-right.

== Overview ==
Blue Grits can generally be described as adhering to conservative liberalism, typically advocating for policies that combine fiscal caution with cultural liberalism, in contrast with the more progressive social liberals. While in some ways akin to Red Tories, Blue Grits tend to be less inclined toward paternalism and traditionalism, instead focusing more on economic liberalism — hence their alternative name, business Liberals.

Prominent current leaders who have been identified as Blue Grits include Mark Carney, the current Prime Minister of Canada, and Bonnie Crombie, the former leader of the Ontario Liberal Party. The former British Columbia Liberal Party, particularly under Christy Clark, embraced pro-business policies and fiscal restraint, attracting both Blue Grits and federal Conservative supporters to form a “free enterprise coalition” against the British Columbia New Democratic Party (BC NDP). The term has also been applied to former Progressive Conservatives who are now Liberals, such as Scott Brison.

== Notable Blue Grits/Examples ==
- Mark Carney, Prime Minister of Canada (since 2025), governor of the Bank of England (2013–2020) and governor of the Bank of Canada (2007–2013)
- John Turner, Prime Minister of Canada (1984) and minister of finance (1972–1975)
- Paul Martin, Prime Minister of Canada (2003–2006) and minister of finance (1993–2002)
- John Manley, Deputy Prime Minister (2002–2003), minister of finance (2003–2003) and minister of industry (1995–2000)
- Martha Hall Findlay, Liberal leadership candidate in 2006 and 2013
- Frank McKenna, Premier of New Brunswick (1987–1997)
- Roy MacLaren, minister of state for finance (1983–1984), minister of national revenue (1984) and minister for international trade (1993–1996)
- Bonnie Crombie, 6th Mayor of Mississauga (2014–2024), leader of the Ontario Liberal Party (2023–2026)
- Christy Clark, Premier of British Columbia (2011–2017)

== See also ==
- Red Tory and Blue Tory, similar factionalism in the Conservative Party of Canada
- Moderates (Liberal Party of Australia)
- New Democrats (United States)
- Third Way
- Classical liberalism
- Conservative liberalism
