= Small-c conservative =

Conservative, not identifying with a conservative party

A small-c conservative is anyone who believes in the philosophy of conservatism but does not necessarily identify with an official Conservative Party. The word "conservative" is used in lower case as the word refers to general principles of conservatism and is not a proper noun, as in a political Conservative Party.

== Context ==
=== Canadian ===
The term was especially popular in Canada during the 1990s when the Progressive Conservative Party was centre-right with the Reform Party (later, the Canadian Alliance) further to the right. Members and supporters of the Reform Party/Canadian Alliance would thus describe themselves as small-c conservatives.

Sometimes referred to as Red Toryism, a notable example is the Progressive Conservative Party of Newfoundland and Labrador's 'Anything But Conservative' (ABC) campaign, which encouraged voters to support any party other than the Conservatives to prevent Conservative candidates from being elected in the next federal election in the province.

In more recent times, provincial Progressive Conservative parties have distanced themselves from the federal Conservative Party of Canada (CPC) in an effort to appeal to a broader base. For example, the Yukon Party (YP) and its leader Currie Dixon publicly stated that the party "has no formal relationship with any federal party", while the leader of the Progressive Conservative Association of Nova Scotia, Tim Houston, similarly distanced his provincial party from a federal Conservative's outreach campaign, clarifying that "it’s two parties".

=== British ===
This term is also used in the United Kingdom to describe those who are conservative in the sense of resisting radical change rather than being members or supporters of the official Conservative Party. For example, the House of Lords as a body tends to resist social change and executive power and therefore—regardless of the numbers of lords who take the Conservative party whip—it is described as "small-c conservative".

It is often applied to groups or individuals within parties other than the Conservatives such as Blue Labour which support positive attitudes to patriotism, tradition or religion, or are skeptical of immigration. In May 2024, Labour shadow foreign secretary David Lammy described himself as "small-c conservative" in a speech, arguing he could find common ground with US Republicans.

== See also ==
- Blue Tory
- Red Tory
