= ResPublica =

British think tank

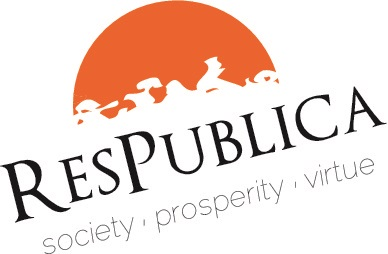
- Company type: Research organisation
- Industry: Social and political research
- Genre: Public policy
- Founded: 2009; 17 years ago
- Founder: Phillip Blond
- Headquarters: 15 Whitehall, Westminster, London, United Kingdom
- Key people: Phillip Blond
- Services: Policy analysis and solutions
- Website: ResPublica

ResPublica (from the Latin phrase, res publica, meaning 'public thing' or 'commonwealth') is a British independent public policy think tank, founded in 2009, by Phillip Blond. It describes itself as a multi-disciplinary, non-party political research organisation, whose stated aim is the creation of bold solutions for enduring socioeconomic problems.

ResPublica claim its ideas are founded on the principles of a post-liberal vision of the future, which moves beyond the traditional political dichotomies of left and right, prioritising the common good.

== History ==
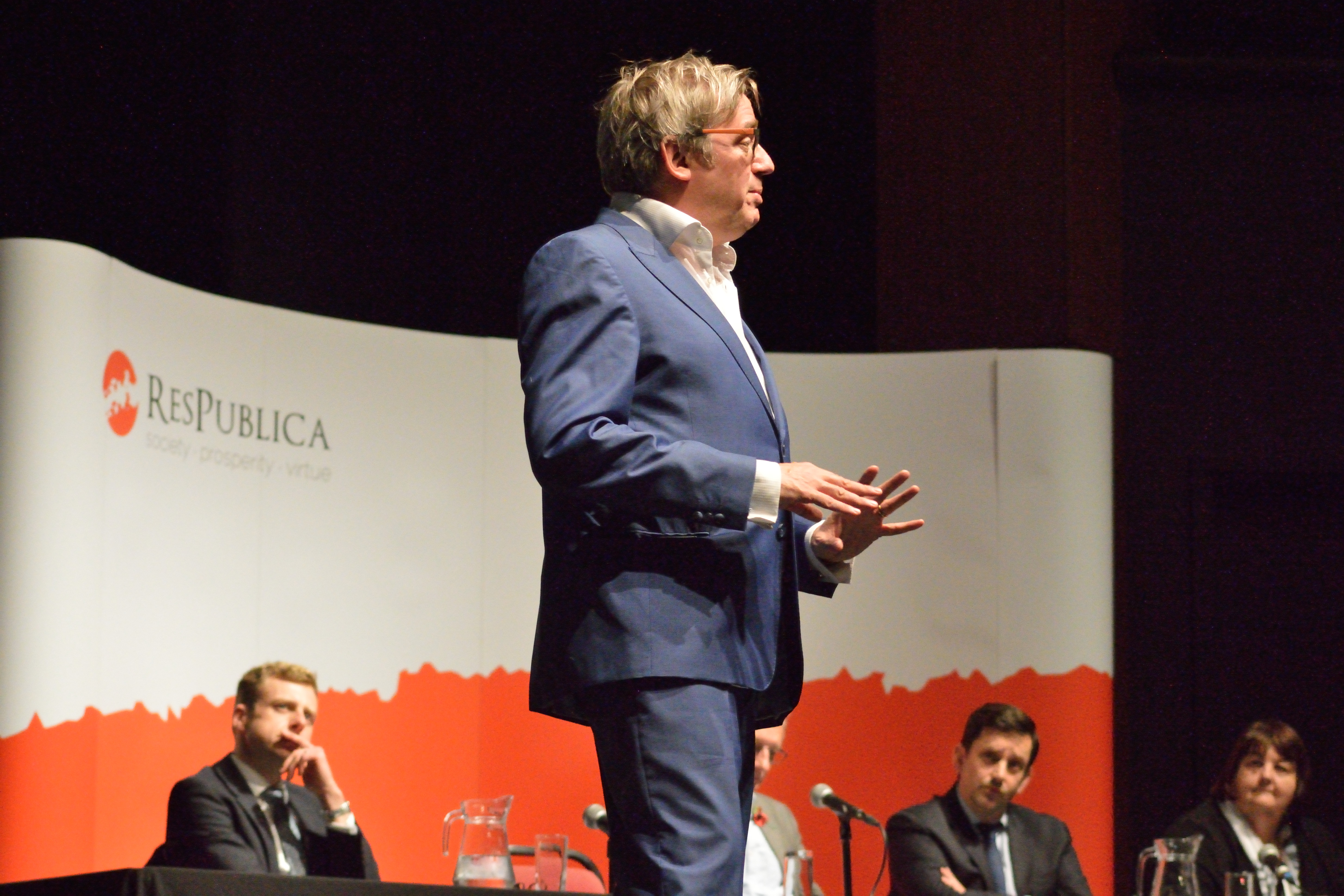
Founder Phillip Blond speaking at a ResPublica event in 2018

David Cameron, then the Leader of the Opposition, spoke at ResPublica's launch in 2009 and, at that time, Blond was said to be a major influence on him.

Blond is Director of ResPublica. Until 2017, Max Wind-Cowie was Deputy Director for ResPublica North.

In 2011, ResPublica made staff redundant after financial troubles resulted in their inability to pay their rent for a time. Blond was later criticised in the media over claims he 'raided' the coffers of his own think tank to pursue a jet-set lifestyle.

ResPublica was operated by a company called The ResPublica Trust, which entered insolvent administration in February 2019. The assets were bought by The Respublica Partnership Limited in a pre-packaged insolvency.

== Notable publications ==
ResPublica's report "To Buy, To Bid, To Build: Community Rights for an Asset Owning Democracy", launched on 15 November 2010, listed strategies for privatisating underperforming public sector built assets. Greg Clark MP, Minister of State for Decentralisation at the Department for Communities and Local Government, spoke at the launch, which was hosted at NESTA with the support of the Development Trusts Association.

As part of the report 'The Community Renewables Economy', ResPublica submitted evidence to the Energy and Climate Change Committee's Local Energy consultation, and to the Department of Energy and Climate Change's (DECC) Community Energy call for evidence.

In November 2013, the motion "to move that this House takes note of the July 2013 report of ResPublica 'Holistic Mission: Social Action and the Church of England'", which was proposed by the then Lord Bishop of Leicester, Tim Stevens, was debated in the House of Lords.

In July 2014, ResPublica's report 'Virtuous Banking: Restoring ethos and purpose to the heart of finance' was launched at the Financial Times by Sir Richard Lambert, Chair of the Banking Standards Review council. The report featured proposals for a 'Bankers' Oath', which was widely reported in the media.

In September 2014, ResPublica launched 'Devo Max - Devo Manc', serving as a roadmap for devolution for Greater Manchester with greater control over finances and an elected mayor. With the signing of the Devolution to the Greater Manchester Combined Authority agreement in November 2014, these changes were adopted by the government and the Combined Authority.

In February 2015, ResPublica published 'Restoring Britain's City States: Devolution, public service reform and local economic growth' at the UK Devolution Summit, jointly hosted by ResPublica and The Core Cities.

In November 2015, ResPublica's interim report 'The Care Collapse: The imminent crisis in residential care and its impact on the NHS' was released (followed up by 'Care After Cure: Creating a fast track pathway from hospitals to homes'), which projected that the loss of care home beds would cost the NHS £3 billion. Later, the government released further funds for the sector in the 2015 Autumn Statement.

== Funding ==
In 2018, before its reorganisation in 2019, ResPublica was rated as 'broadly transparent' in its funding by Transparify. In November 2022, the funding transparency website Who Funds You? gave ResPublica an E grade, the lowest transparency rating.

== See also ==
- List of think tanks in the United Kingdom
- One-nation conservatism
- Red Tory
- Blue Labour
