= Phillip Blond =

English philosopher (born 1966)

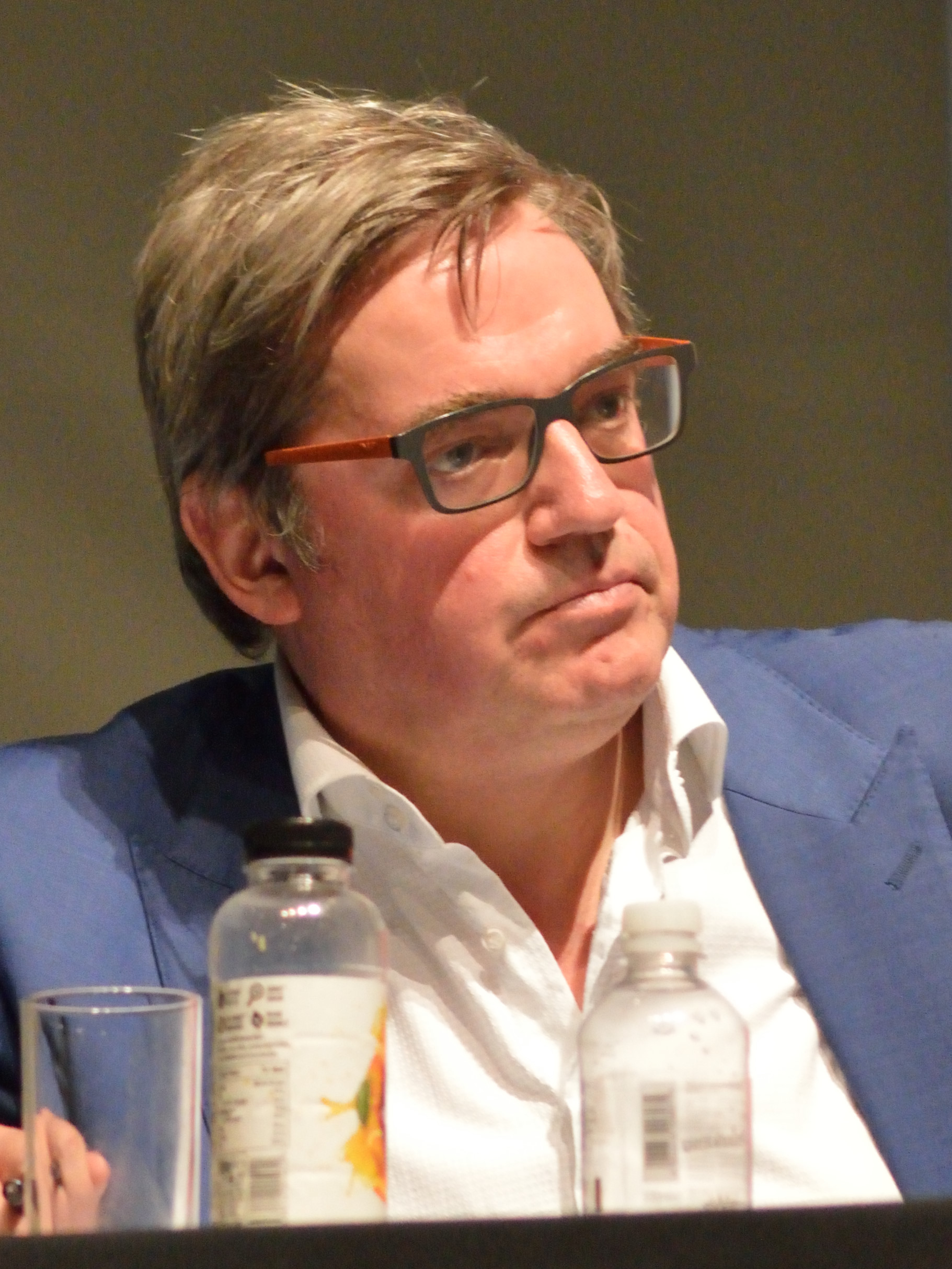
- Blond in 2018
- Born: 1 March 1966 (age 60); Liverpool, England

Scholarly background
- Education: University of Hull; University of Warwick; Peterhouse, Cambridge
- Doctoral advisor: John Milbank
- Influences: Edmund Burke; Benjamin Disraeli

Scholarly work
- Discipline: Philosophy; theology
- Sub-discipline: Political philosophy
- School or tradition: Anglicanism; communitarianism; radical orthodoxy; red Toryism
- Influenced: David Cameron

Phillip Blond (born 1 March 1966) is an English political philosopher, Anglican theologian, and director of the ResPublica think tank.

== Early life ==
Blond was born on 1 March 1966 in Liverpool. He was educated at Pensby High School for Boys, Blond went on to study philosophy and politics at the University of Hull, continental philosophy at the University of Warwick, and theology at Peterhouse at the University of Cambridge. At Peterhouse, he was a student of John Milbank, founder of the radical orthodoxy theological movement and a noted critic of liberalism, philosophically understood. Blond's first work, Post-Secular Philosophy: Between Philosophy and Theology, is very much in the radical orthodoxy line of thought and includes essays by many of that group's members. Blond won a prize research fellowship in philosophy at the New School for Social Research in New York.. Blond is the step-brother of James Bond actor, Daniel Craig.

== Career ==
Blond was a senior lecturer in Christian theology at the Lancaster campus of St Martin's College and after the merger with Cumbria Institute of the Arts in August 2007 he worked at the Lancaster campus the University of Cumbria and was a lecturer in the Department of Theology at the University of Exeter.

Blond was the director of the Progressive Conservatism Project at the London-based think tank Demos, but left due to "political and philosophical differences" to establish his own think tank, ResPublica.

Blond gained prominence from a cover story in Prospect magazine in the February 2009 edition with his essay on red Toryism, which proposed a radical communitarian traditionalist conservatism that inveighed against both state and market monopoly.

According to Blond, these two large-scale realities, while usually spoken of as diametrically opposed, are in reality the two sides of the same coin. As he explains it, modern and postmodern individualism and statism have always been connected of the hip, at least since the advent of Jean-Jacques Rousseau's thought, if not well before that in the work of Thomas Hobbes. In a series of articles in both The Guardian and The Independent he has argued for a wider recognition of the merits of civic conservatism and an appreciation of the potentially transformative impact of a new Tory settlement.

In 2010, The Daily Telegraph called him "a driving force behind David Cameron's 'Big Society' agenda."

Blond is a fellow of the National Endowment for Science, Technology and the Arts.

== Writings ==
- Post-Secular Philosophy: Between Philosophy and Theology (editor), London: Routledge, 1998, ISBN 0-415-09778-9
- Red Tory: How Left and Right Have Broken Britain and How We Can Fix It, London: Faber, 2010, ISBN 978-0-571-25167-4
- Radical Republic: How Left and Right Have Broken the System and How We Can Fix It, New York: W. W. Norton & Company, 2012, ISBN 978-0-393-08100-8
- Phillip Blond, Mark Morrin, The Way Ahead for the UK's Core Cities: Devolution, Public Service Reform and Local Economic Growth, London: The ResPublica Trust, 2015, ISBN 9781908027214

== See also ==
- Distributism
- High Tory
