= Norman Atkins =

Canadian politician

The Honourable Norman Atkins

Canadian Senator from Ontario
- In office June 30, 1986 – June 27, 2009
- Appointed by: Brian Mulroney

Personal details
- Born: Norman Kempton Atkins; June 27, 1934 Montclair, New Jersey, U.S.
- Died: September 28, 2010 (aged 76) Fredericton, New Brunswick, Canada
- Party: Progressive Conservative
- Profession: Politician; lawyer; businessman

Norman Kempton Atkins (June 27, 1934 – September 28, 2010) was an American-born Canadian political campaign strategist, politician, lawyer, and businessman. Atkins and his brother in-law and mentor Dalton Camp, both leading Progressive Conservative Party (PC Party) strategists from the 1960s to the 1990s, were credited for their significant roles in the electoral success of Ontario Premier Bill Davis (in office 1971–85) and Canadian Prime Minister Brian Mulroney (in office 1984–93). Atkins was appointed to the Canadian Senate in 1986 on the advice of Prime Minister Brian Mulroney, and served in the body until his mandatory retirement in 2009.

== Early years ==
Born in Montclair, New Jersey, Atkins was a graduate of Appleby College in Oakville and of Acadia University in Wolfville, Nova Scotia, where he completed the Bachelor of Arts program in 1957. He subsequently received an Honorary Doctorate in Civil Law in 2000, from Acadia University.

== Political Strategist ==
Atkins was a leading campaign and advertising strategist and advertising and a senior Progressive Conservative Party of Ontario and Progressive Conservative Party of Canada . He was especially associated with the Big Blue Machine, which helped elect the Ontario PC Party under Bill Davis.

Atkins joined his brother-in-law Dalton Camp in Camp's successful effort ousting former Prime Minister John Diefenbaker as PC Party leader. Due to their infamy in the conservative circles, Bill Davis did not engage them for his 1971 leadership bid. Atkins and Camp became instrumental players in the insurgent campaign of Allen Lawrence, who came within 44 votes of dislodging the presumptive frontrunner Davis. Immediately following the leadership convention, Davis not only put his rivals in key cabinet role, but proactively brought in Atkins, Camp and other key campaign operatives that supported Lawrence to united the party. The united team became the famed Big Blue Machine.

In the 1980s, he was a strategist for the federal Conservatives, led by Brian Mulroney, who recommended him to Governor General Jeanne Sauvé for appointment to the Senate in 1986.

Atkins opposed the merger of the Progressive Conservative Party with the Canadian Alliance, and refused to join the product of that merger, the Conservative Party of Canada. Instead, he continued to sit in the Senate as a "Progressive Conservative" along with Lowell Murray and Elaine McCoy. He did not initially rule out joining the new Conservative Party caucus in the future, saying in February 2004, "I will be watching with interest, both the Leadership and the policies of the new party, to see whether they address my concerns. It is my hope that they will reflect the values and beliefs Progressive Conservatives hold so strongly". However, he continued to sit as a Progressive Conservative for the duration of his time in the Senate.

On February 27, 2007, Atkins was elected vice-chairman of the Senate's National Security and Defence Committee. He was elected with the support of defiant Liberal senators after moderate Conservative Senator Michael Meighen resigned his position at the direction of the Prime Minister's Office who reportedly wished to install a more ideologically conservative co-chair.

Atkins retired from the Senate upon turning 75 on June 27, 2009. He died in Fredericton on September 28, 2010, at the age of 76.

== Archives ==
There is a Norman Atkins fonds at Library and Archives Canada. Archival reference number is R5376.

== See also ==
- List of Ontario senators
