= Progressive Conservative Party of Canada =

Federal political party (1942–2003)

Progressive Conservative Party of Canada Parti progressiste-conservateur du Canada
- Abbreviation: PC; PPC
- Leader: Full list
- Founded: December 10, 1942 (83 years, 315 days)
- Dissolved: Parliament: December 7, 2003 (22 years, 318 days) (Note: However, Joe Clark continued to be recognized in parliament as a Progressive Conservative until February 2, 2004.) Senate: February 17, 2016 (10 years, 246 days)
- Preceded by: Conservative Party of Canada (1867)
- Merged into: Conservative Party (2003)
- Succeeded by: Progressive Canadian Party (minority)
- Headquarters: 806-141 Laurier Avenue West, Ottawa, Ontario
- Membership (2003): 40,000 (Note: Party members that were eligible to vote.)
- Ideology: Conservatism (Canadian); Economic liberalism
- Political position: Centre-right
- International affiliation: International Democrat Union
- Colours: Blue-purple

Website
- pcparty.ca at the Wayback Machine (archived 1998-12-12)

The Progressive Conservative Party of Canada (PC; French: Parti progressiste-conservateur du Canada, PPC) was a centre-right federal political party in Canada that existed from 1942 to 2003.

From Canadian Confederation in 1867 until 1942, the original Conservative Party of Canada participated in numerous governments and had multiple names. In 1942, its name was changed to the Progressive Conservative Party under the request of newly elected party leader Premier John Bracken of Manitoba, a former member of the Progressive Party of Manitoba.

In the 1957 federal election, John Diefenbaker carried the party to their first victory in 27 years and the following year, led the party to the largest federal electoral landslide in history. During his tenure, human rights initiatives were achieved, most notably the Bill of Rights. In the 1963 federal election, the party lost power and would not regain it until 1979, when Joe Clark led the party to a minority government victory. The party lost power just nine months later.

In 1983, Clark lost his leadership role to Brian Mulroney, who helped the PC Party gain popularity in Quebec. Mulroney won back-to-back majority governments in 1984 and 1988, and during his tenure, major economic reforms such as the North American Free Trade Agreement and the goods and services tax (GST) were introduced.

The GST, the government's failed attempts to revise the Constitution with the Meech Lake and Charlottetown accords, and the early 1990s recession, led to the party's increasing unpopularity and eventual collapse in the 1993 federal election where they won just two seats. In Western Canada the bulk of the party's support transferred to the right-wing populist Reform Party (which later became the Canadian Alliance), while in Quebec support shifted to the sovereigntist Bloc Québécois.

The Progressive Conservatives failed to recover much lost ground in the subsequent 1997 and 2000 federal elections. When it became clear that neither the Progressive Conservatives nor the Canadian Alliance could on their own defeat the incumbent Liberals, an effort to unite the right-of-centre parties emerged. Eventually, in 2003 the party membership voted to dissolve the party and merge with the Canadian Alliance to form the current Conservative Party of Canada.

Like their British counterparts, members and supporters of the Progressive Conservative Party were known as "Tories". Provincial variants of the Progressive Conservative Party continue to exist in a number of provinces.

== Predecessors ==
The party pre-dates Confederation in 1867, when it accepted many conservative-leaning former members of the Liberal Party into its ranks. At Confederation, the Conservative Party became Canada's first governing party under Sir John A. Macdonald. The federal Tories governed Canada for over 40 of the country's first 70 years of existence.

However, the party spent the majority of its history in opposition as the nation's number-two federal party, behind the Liberal Party of Canada. From 1896 to 1993, the Tories formed government six times—from 1911 to 1921, briefly in 1926, from 1930 to 1935, from 1957 to 1963, from 1979 to 1980 and from 1984 to 1993. It stands as the only Canadian party to have won more than 200 seats in an election—a feat it accomplished twice: in 1958 and 1984.

The party adopted the "Progressive Conservative" name in 1942 when Manitoba Premier John Bracken, a long-time leader of that province's Progressive Party, agreed to become leader of the federal Conservatives on condition that the party add Progressive to its name. Despite the name change, most former Progressive supporters continued to support the Liberal Party of Canada or the Co-operative Commonwealth Federation, and Bracken's leadership of the Conservative Party came to an end in 1948. Many Canadians simply continued to refer to the party as "the Conservatives".

A major weakness of the party since 1885 was its inability to win support in Quebec, estranged significantly by that year's execution of Louis Riel. The Conscription Crisis of 1917 exacerbated the issue. Even though the Conservative Party of Quebec dominated politics in that province for the first 30 years of Confederation at both the federal and provincial levels, in the 20th century the party was never able to become a force in provincial politics, losing power in 1897, and dissolving in 1935 into the Union Nationale, which took power in 1936 under Maurice Duplessis.

In 20th-century federal politics, the Conservatives were often seen as insensitive to French-Canadian ambitions and interests and seldom succeeded in winning more than a handful of seats in Quebec, with a few notable exceptions:

- the 1930 federal election, in which Richard Bedford Bennett surprisingly led the party to a thin majority government victory by securing 24 seats in rural Quebec;
- the 1958 federal election, in which John Diefenbaker rode the backing of the right-leaning Union Nationale provincial government in Quebec to 50 of the province's 75 seats; and
- the federal elections of 1984 and 1988, when party leader Brian Mulroney, a fluently bilingual Quebecois, built an electoral coalition that included Quebec nationalists.

The party never fully recovered from the fragmentation of Mulroney's broad coalition in the late 1980s, resulting in part from the failure of two provinces to ratify the Meech Lake Accord. The party suffered a decade-long decline following the 1993 federal election, during which it did not hold more than 20 seats in the House of Commons. It formally dissolved on December 7, 2003, when it merged with the Canadian Alliance to form the modern-day Conservative Party of Canada.

Several loosely associated provincial Progressive Conservative parties continue to exist in Manitoba, Ontario, New Brunswick, Nova Scotia, Prince Edward Island and Newfoundland and Labrador. As well, a small rump of senators opposed the merger, and continued to sit in the Parliament of Canada as Progressive Conservatives. The last one of them rescinded their party status in 2016. The Yukon association of the party renamed itself as the Yukon Party in 1990. The British Columbia Progressive Conservative Party changed its name to the British Columbia Conservative Party in 1991. Saskatchewan's Progressive Conservative Party effectively ceased to exist in 1997, when the Saskatchewan Party formed – primarily from former PC Members of the Legislative Assembly (MLAs) with a few Saskatchewan Liberal MLAs joining them.

== Ideology ==
The Progressive Conservative Party was generally on the centre to centre-right on the political spectrum. From 1867 on, the party was identified with Protestant and, in Quebec, Roman Catholic social values, British imperialism, Canadian nationalism, and constitutional centralism. This was highly successful until 1920, and to that point in history, the party was the most successful federal party in the Dominion.

As such, Canadian conservatism historically initially more closely resembled that which was practiced in the United Kingdom and, to an extent, Europe, than in the United States. The "Tory" approach worked well for the party until 1917, when, as was common among 19th-century conservative movements, Canadian Tories opposed the rollback of government intervention in social and economic matters advocated by the liberals of the era. In contrast to "American conservative" counterparts, however, they did not undertake as dramatic an ideological turnaround in the first half of the 20th century by continuing to follow mercantilism and nascent notions of the welfare state.

Like their federal Liberal rivals, the party defined itself as a "big tent", welcoming a broad variety of members who supported relatively loosely defined goals. Unlike the Liberal Party, there was a long history of ongoing factionalism within this tent. This factionalism arose from the party's lack of electoral success, and because the party often reached out to particular political groups in order to garner enough support to topple the Liberals. These groups usually remained semi-autonomous blocs within the party, such as Quebec nationalists and western Canadian Reformers in the 1980s. In later years, observers generally grouped the PC Party's core membership into two camps, "Red Tories" and "Blue Tories".

Red Tories tend to be traditionally conservative, that is, "Tory" in the Disraelian sense in social policy, placing a high value on the principles of noblesse oblige, communitarianism, and one nation conservatism—and were thus seen as moderate (in the context of classical economic thought) in their economic policy. For most of their history they were trade protectionists, engaging in free-trade economics in only a limited fashion, as in Empire Free-Trade. Historically they comprised the largest bloc of the original Canadian Conservative party. Notable Red Tories include John Farthing, George Grant, John Diefenbaker, E. Davie Fulton, Robert Stanfield, Dufferin Roblin, Dalton Camp, W. L. Morton, George A. Drew, Leslie Frost, John Robarts, William Davis, Peter Lougheed, Joe Clark and Flora MacDonald.

Blue Tories, on the other hand, were originally members of the Tory elite drawn from the commercial classes in Montreal and Toronto. Prior to World War II, they were generally conservative in social policy, and classically liberal in economic policy. From 1964 on, this cadre came to identify more with neoliberal influences in the US Republican Party, as espoused by Barry Goldwater and Ronald Reagan, and the Thatcherite leadership in the British Conservative Party, as represented by Sir Keith Joseph and Margaret Thatcher. They have come to be termed—in the Canadian lexicon—as neoconservatives. However, there are also Blue Tories who identify strongly with the monarchy in Canada and other traditional institutions. In Canada, Blue Tories include Ralph Klein and Mike Harris.

From 1891 until the party's dissolution, Red Tories generally dominated the highest rungs of the party and its leadership. The emerging neoconservatives of the 1970s were significantly reduced in numbers in the party by the late 1980s, and many of the disaffected drifted towards neoliberalism and parties with a neoconservative bent, such as the Reform Party of Canada. When the PC party held power at the federal level, it never truly embraced Reaganomics and its crusade against "big government" as vociferously as was done in the United States.

Canadian neoconservatives lean more towards individualism and economic liberalism. Support for the Canadian Alliance and its predecessor the Reform Party of Canada derived principally from this group, and that support carried forward into the new Conservative Party of Canada. The success of the neoconservative movement in using the label "Conservative" has brought into debate the very definition of conservatism in Canada today. Although adhering to economic philosophies similar to those originally advanced by 19th-century liberals (known confusingly as both neoliberalism and neoconservatism), the Canadian Alliance agreed to the name "Conservative Party of Canada" for the new party.

== History ==
After a by-election defeat in 1942, a group of younger Conservatives from the Conservative Party of Canada met in Port Hope, Ontario, to develop a new Conservative policy they hoped would bring them out of the political wilderness. The participants, known as the Port Hopefuls, developed a program including many Conservative goals such as support for free enterprise and conscription. Yet the charter also included more radical policies, such as full-employment, low-cost housing, trade union rights, as well as a whole range of social security measures, including a government financed medicare system.

Although many Conservatives rejected the charter, the charter still influenced party decisions. Delegates at the convention drafted John Bracken as leader, who was not even a member of the party. Bracken supported the Port Hope Charter and insisted the party register this policy shift by changing its name to the Progressive Conservative Party.

In the early days of Canadian Confederation, the party supported a mercantilist approach to economic development: export-led growth with high import barriers to protect local industry. The party was staunchly monarchist and supported playing a large role within the British Empire. It was seen by some French Canadians as supporting a policy of cultural assimilation.

The Conservative Party dominated Canadian politics for the nation's first 30 years. In general, Canada's political history has consisted of Tories alternating power with the Liberals, albeit often in minority governments supported by smaller parties.

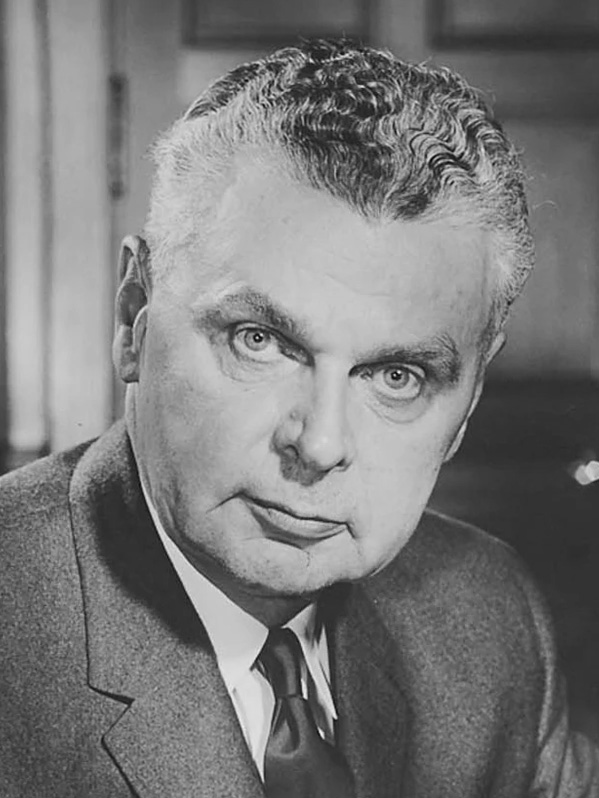
John Diefenbaker, the 13th prime minister of Canada (1957–1963)

After a long period of Liberal dominance following the Tories ill-fated Depression-era mandate from 1930 to 1935, John Diefenbaker won a minority government in 1957, followed by a sweeping electoral victory for the Tories in 1958. Diefenbaker was able to win most of the parliamentary seats in Western Canada, much of those in Ontario, and, with the support of the Union Nationale provincial government, a large number in Quebec. Diefenbaker attempted to pursue a policy of distancing Canada from the United States. His cabinet split over Diefenbaker's refusal of American demands that Canada accept nuclear warheads for Bomarc missiles based in North Bay, Ontario, and La Macaza, Quebec. This split contributed to the Tory government's defeat at the hands of Lester B. Pearson's Liberals in the 1963 election.

Diefenbaker remained Progressive Conservative leader until 1967, when increasing unease at his erratic behaviour, authoritarian leadership, and perceived unelectability led party president Dalton Camp to call for and win a motion for a leadership review which resulted in the 1967 leadership convention where Nova Scotia Premier Robert Stanfield was elected out of a field of eleven candidates that included Diefenbaker and Manitoba Premier Duff Roblin. Despite being personally well-regarded, Stanfield struggled to make an impact against Pierre Trudeau, who became Prime Minister the following year. The 1972 election saw the party come within two seats of toppling the Liberal government, with their historical weakness in Quebec keeping them from victory, but a gaffe-ridden Tory campaign at the following election two years later saw the Liberals regain their parliamentary majority, leading to Stanfield's resignation.

=== Clark–Mulroney era ===
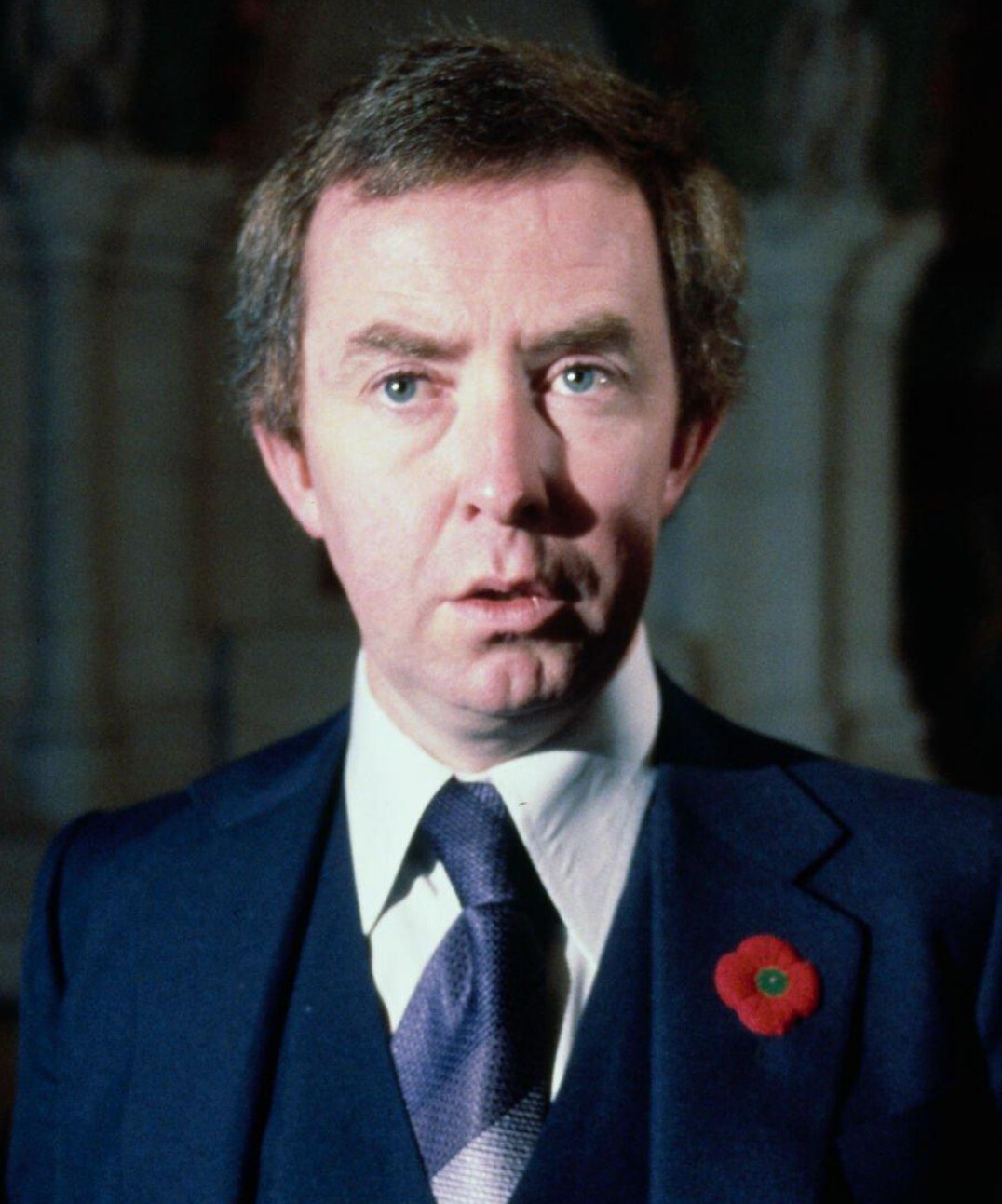
Joe Clark, the 16th prime minister of Canada (1979–1980)

Logo of the Progressive Conservative Party during the 1970s and 1980s

Joe Clark took the leadership of the Progressive Conservative Party in 1976. He came to power in the 1979 election, defeating the Liberal government of Pierre Trudeau and ending sixteen years of continuous Liberal rule. Taking office the day before his 40th birthday, Clark is the youngest person to become prime minister. His tenure was brief as he only won a minority government, and it was defeated on a motion of non-confidence pertaining to his 1979 budget. Clark's Progressive Conservative Party lost the 1980 election and Clark lost the leadership of the party to Brian Mulroney in 1983.

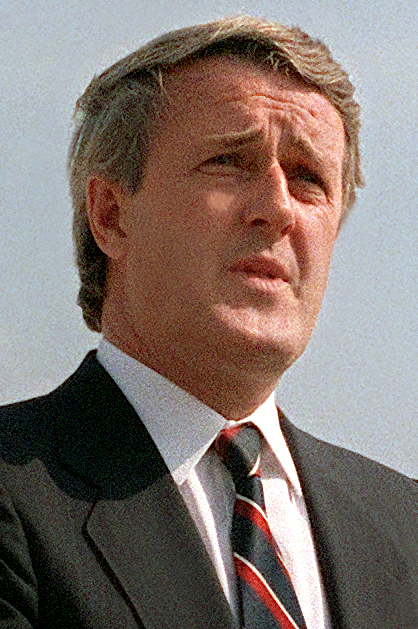
Brian Mulroney, the 18th prime minister of Canada (1984–1993)

Logo of the Progressive Conservative Party in 1988

In the late 1960s and 1970s, following Quebec's Quiet Revolution, the Progressive Conservatives recognized the need to increase their appeal to Canada's francophone population. At the same time, the Tories moved away from economic nationalism towards a neoliberal platform. Both movements culminated with Brian Mulroney becoming prime minister after the election of 1984. He led the Tories to a record 211 seats, and a majority of seats in every province.

Mulroney had declared himself an opponent to free trade with the United States during the 1983 leadership campaign. But a growing continentalist sentiment among Canadian business leaders and the impact of the "Reagan Revolution" on Canadian conservative thought led Mulroney to embrace free trade. His government endorsed the recommendation of the 1985 Royal Commission on the Economic Union and Development Prospects for Canada that Canada pursue a free trade deal with the United States.

Traditionally, it had been the Liberal Party that held a position of continentalism and the Conservatives who had opposed free trade with the United States in favour of economic links with the United Kingdom. With the dissolution of the British Empire and the economic nationalism of the Liberal Party under Pierre Trudeau, the traditional positions of the two parties became reversed. It was with this background that Mulroney fought and won the 1988 election on the issue of the Canada–United States Free Trade Agreement.

Mulroney also made a promise to Quebecers, claiming that he would reform the Canadian Constitution so that Quebec would be willing to endorse the revised Constitution, which it did not in 1982, unlike Canada's other provinces. To do this, Mulroney promised that he would give Quebec distinct society status within a federal Canada with greater autonomy. This helped Mulroney garner substantial support from Quebec nationalists including Lucien Bouchard who joined the Conservatives claiming that providing Quebec with autonomy would be acceptable for Quebec to remain within Canada.

Although the Progressive Conservative Party switched to neoliberalism, the party did retain its social progressive policies unlike other parties which advocated neoliberalism. Mulroney and the government pursued an aggressive environmental agenda under the aide of then-environmental policy advisor, present-day Green Party leader Elizabeth May. Mulroney and members of the U.S. government sparred over action on acid rain. In the end Mulroney managed to convince U.S. president Ronald Reagan to sign a treaty to reduce acid rain.

Mulroney's government significantly boosted Canada's annual immigration targets, moving them up from around 84,000 to over 250,000 by the early 1990s, a major policy shift focusing on economic class via the points system, reflecting a broader strategy to grow the population and labor force.

A number of economic and governance issues contributed to the downfall of the Progressive Conservative party at the federal level in the 1993 federal election:

- Canada suffered its worst recession since the Second World War,
- Unemployment rose to horrendous levels since the Great Depression,
- The federal government faced high and persistent deficits, and
- The Tories had introduced a much-despised new tax, the Goods and Services Tax.
- Extensive government corruption and accusations of corruption and government mismanagement were in the news, such as the Airbus affair and evidence showing Canadian peacekeepers maltreating Somalis, which resulted in the Somalia inquiry.
- During the election campaign the Tories used an attack ad against Liberal leader Jean Chrétien, which appeared to mock his odd facial expressions—which were the result of Bell's palsy—and suggest he was unfit for the post of prime minister because of them.

The second major factor leading to the Mulroney government's demise was that the party's base in Quebec came from Quebec nationalists, who withdrew their support after the failure of the Meech Lake and Charlottetown accords. Many Quebec Tories, including a number of Members of Parliament (MPs), left the party to form the Bloc Québécois with like-minded Liberals.

The third major factor was the rise of western alienation in the four provinces of western Canada as a result of attempts by both Tories and Liberals to favour Quebec. Western Canadians turned their support to the Reform Party of Canada and later to its successor, the Canadian Alliance. Badults in Beaver River, Chambly, Laurier—Sainte-Marie, Oshawa and York North solidified the PC decline.

=== Kim Campbell and decline ===
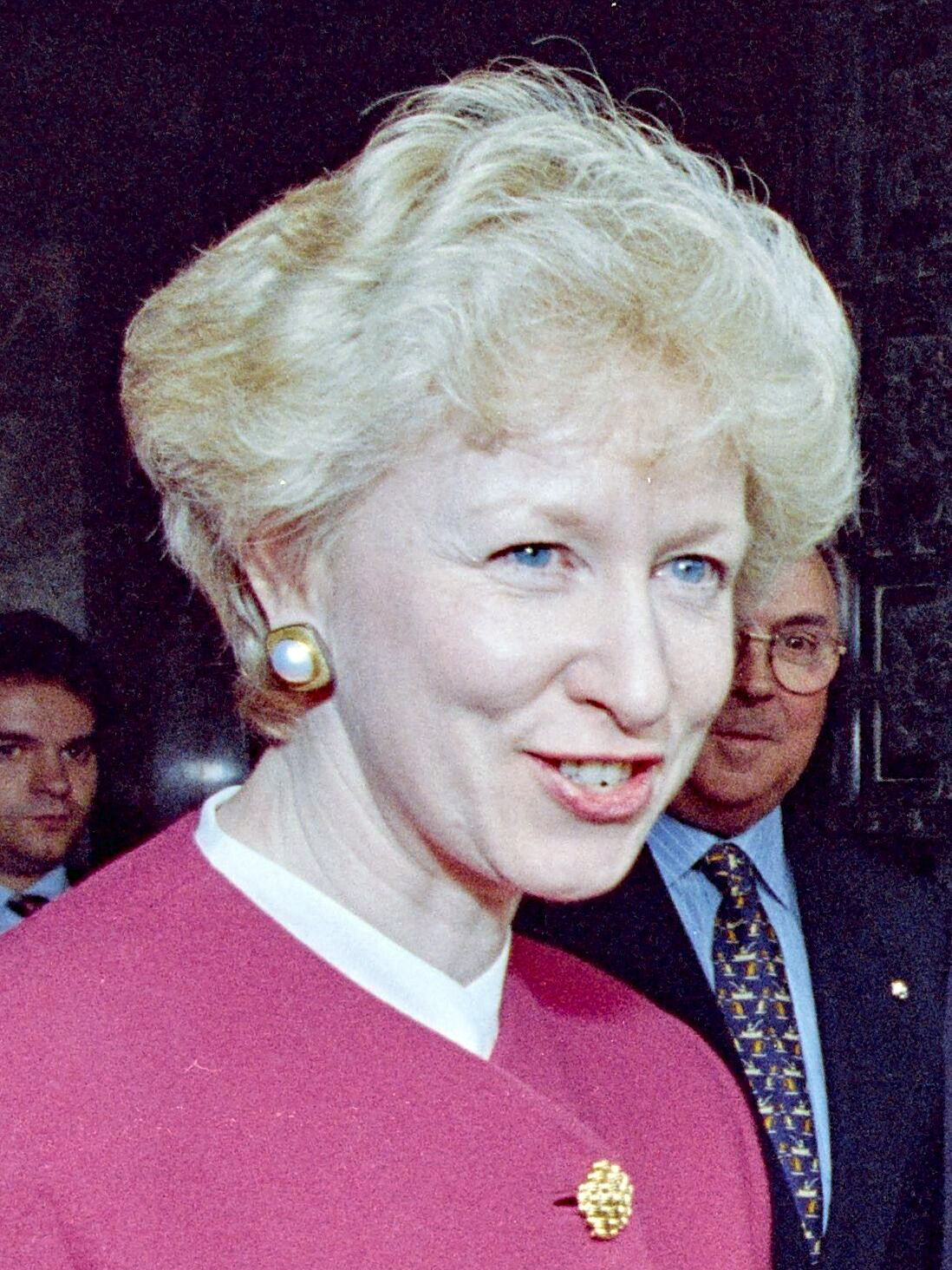
Kim Campbell, the 19th prime minister of Canada (June – November 1993)

Logo of the Progressive Conservative Party in 1993

Following Mulroney's resignation, his successor as Tory leader and as prime minister was Kim Campbell, who led the party into the disastrous election of 1993. The Progressive Conservatives went from being the majority party to holding only two seats in the House of Commons, which was not enough to maintain official party status despite garnering 16% of the popular vote. It was the worst defeat ever suffered for a governing party at the federal level; the 151-seat loss far exceeded the 95 seats lost by the Liberals in 1984. The party's western supporters transferred virtually en masse to Reform, most of its Quebec supporters split between the sovereigntist Bloc Québécois and the Liberals, and most of its Ontario and Atlantic supporters bolted for the Liberals. Even though the Progressive Conservatives finished third in the popular vote (just percentage points behind Reform), their support was spread out across the entire country and was not concentrated in enough areas to translate into more seats. By contrast, the Bloc managed to capture Official Opposition status with 54 seats despite running candidates only in Quebec, while Reform finished third in the seat count despite being virtually nonexistent east of Manitoba.

Campbell herself was defeated to Hedy Fry, as was every member of the Cabinet except Jean Charest, whom Campbell had defeated in the election to succeed Mulroney. Campbell resigned as party leader in December, and Charest, as the only remaining member of the previous Cabinet, was quickly appointed interim leader and confirmed in the post in 1995. The party continued to hold a majority of seats in the Senate until 1997, where Senator John Lynch-Staunton served as Leader of the Opposition in the Senate. Charest led the party back to official party status in the 1997 election, winning 20 seats. With the exception of one seat each in Ontario and Manitoba, the rest of the seats were all in the Maritimes and Quebec. However, the PCs never won more than 20 seats again, and only two west of Quebec (not counting by-elections and switches from other parties).

== Merger ==
The rise of the Reform Party/Canadian Alliance was doubtless damaging to the Tories. Many observers argue that for over ten years, from 1993 to 2004, the "conservative" vote was split between the two parties, allowing Liberal candidates to win ridings that were previously considered safe for the Tories, made possible by a first-past-the-post electoral system. This assessment led to the growth of the United Alternative movements of the late 1990s. Others insisted that a legitimate ideological gulf existed between the more ideological Alliance and the more moderate Red Tory-influenced PC Party, pointing to surveys that indicated many Tory voters would rather select the Liberals as their second choice than the Alliance. This seemed to be particularly born out in Ontario. The Liberals won all but one seat in that province in 1993 and 1997, and all but two in 2000—an era that was dominated by the provincial Tories. This was largely because many former bellwether ridings in suburban Toronto (known as "the 905", after its area code) turned almost solidly Liberal for most of the 1990s at the federal level while supporting the Tories at the provincial level.

Charest stepped down from the leadership in 1998 to become leader of the Quebec Liberal Party. Former leader Joe Clark returned to the post in a vote in which all party members were eligible to cast ballots, instead of a traditional leadership convention. A point system allocated each riding 100 points to be distributed among the candidates by proportional representation according to votes cast by party members in the riding. This same system was used by the Conservative Party of Canada in 2004. In the 2000 election Clark was able to garner the 12 seats necessary for official party status, but no more.

Clark realized that as long as the centre-right vote was divided, there was no chance of dislodging the Liberals, but he wanted a merger on his own terms. He got his chance in 2001, when several dissident Alliance MPs, the most prominent one being Alliance deputy leader and party matriarch Deborah Grey, left the Alliance caucus. The dissidents felt that Alliance leader Stockwell Day hadn't learned from mistakes made in the last election. While some of them rejoined the Alliance later, seven of them, led by Chuck Strahl of British Columbia and including Grey, refused and formed the Democratic Representative Caucus. The DRC quickly entered a coalition with the Progressive Conservatives, which lasted until 2002 when Stephen Harper ousted Day as Alliance leader. Harper wanted a closer union with the PCs, but Clark turned the offer down, and all but two of the DRC members rejoined the Alliance. One of the two, Inky Mark, eventually joined the PCs. Two by-election victories later in 2002 increased the PC caucus to 15 members and fourth place in the Commons. Clark, however, was unable to gain any ground in Ontario, and resigned on August 6, 2002.

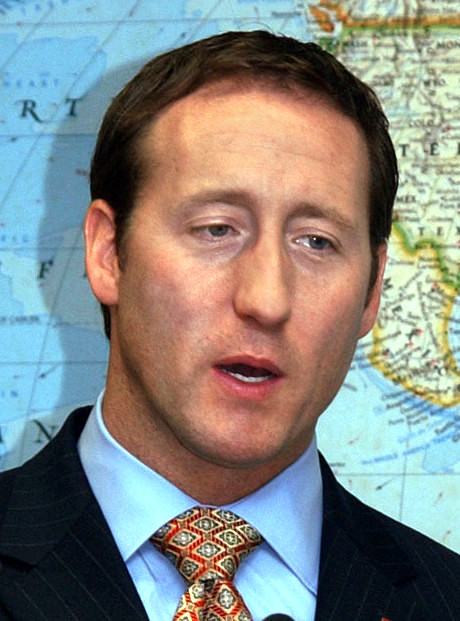
Peter MacKay

On May 31, 2003, Peter MacKay won the party leadership after securing the endorsement of controversial fellow leadership candidate David Orchard, an outspoken opponent of free trade who wanted to return the party to its traditional economic nationalist roots. Orchard's endorsement of MacKay was predicated on four bullet points laid out in the Orchard-MacKay agreement, one of which expressly forbade the merger of the PC Party of Canada with the Canadian Alliance. After only a few months as party leader though, MacKay reneged on his promise and proceeded to negotiate a merger with the Alliance, which he announced had occurred on October 15, 2003. The two parties, it seemed, united to form a new party called the Conservative Party of Canada. The union was ratified on December 5 and 6 in a process conducted by each of the parties, and the new Conservative Party was formally registered on December 7. The merger prompted Clark to remark, "Some equate it to a death in the family. I regard it rather as a death of the family." On March 20, 2004, former Alliance leader Harper was elected leader of the new party and appointed MacKay as his deputy.

== Post-merger ==
Following the merger, a rump Progressive Conservative caucus remained in Parliament, consisting of individuals who declined to join the new Conservative Party. In the House of Commons, Joe Clark, André Bachand and John Herron sat as PC members. In the 2004 election, Bachand and Clark did not run for re-election, and Herron ran as a Liberal, losing to Rob Moore in his riding of Fundy—Royal. Scott Brison, who had joined the Liberal caucus immediately upon departing the Conservative Party, was reelected as a Liberal in the 2004 election. After being expelled from the Conservative Party caucus in June 2007, Nova Scotia MP Bill Casey designated himself as an "Independent Progressive Conservative".

In the Senate, William Doody, Lowell Murray and Norman Atkins also declined to join the new party, and continued to sit as Progressive Conservative senators. On March 24, 2005, prime minister Paul Martin appointed nine new senators, two of whom, Nancy Ruth and Elaine McCoy, were designated Progressive Conservatives. Ruth subsequently left to sit with the Conservative Party. The death of Senator Doody on December 27, 2005, and the mandatory retirement of Norman Atkins on June 27, 2009, and Lowell Murray on September 26, 2011, left McCoy, the youngest of the five, as the sole Progressive Conservative in the Senate and the last sitting PC in either chamber of Parliament until February 11, 2013, when she chose to change her designation to "Independent Progressive Conservative". McCoy changed her designation to "Independent" on February 17, 2016, thus bringing to an end the presence of Progressive Conservatives in Parliament.

=== Progressive Canadian Party ===
On January 9, 2004, a group claiming to be loyal to the Progressive Conservative Party and opposed to the merger, which they characterized as an Alliance takeover, filed application with the Chief Electoral Officer to register a party called the Progressive Conservative Party of Canada. The application was refused on the grounds that the name could no longer be utilized. The group resubmitted with the name Progressive Canadian Party, and a new "PC Party" was recognized by Elections Canada on March 26. It secured sufficient backing to be registered as an official party on May 29. It was led by former Progressive Conservative MP Joe Hueglin of Ontario.

The Progressive Canadian party aimed to be perceived as the successor party to the Progressive Conservatives. However, it did not enjoy broad support among former Progressive Conservatives. In particular, no prominent anti-merger Progressive Conservatives such as Joe Clark or David Orchard were associated with the Progressive Canadian Party, nor were any sitting MPs or senators. The most prominent members to join were two 1970s and 1980s era politicians: former cabinet minister Sinclair Stevens and former junior cabinet minister, Heward Grafftey, who polled near or below Craig Chandler in the final PC Party leadership race. It was deregistered by Elections Canada in late 2019.

== Party leaders ==
Picture	Name	Term start	Term end	Riding as leader	Notes
	John Bracken	December 11, 1942	July 20, 1948	Neepawa	11th premier of Manitoba
	George Drew	October 2, 1948	September 21, 1956	Carleton	14th premier of Ontario
	William Earl Rowe	September 21, 1956 (Interim)	December 14, 1956	Dufferin—Simcoe	Interim leader
	John Diefenbaker	December 14, 1956	September 9, 1967	Prince Albert	13th prime minister of Canada
	Robert Stanfield	September 9, 1967	February 22, 1976	Colchester—Hants, Halifax	17th premier of Nova Scotia
	Joe Clark	February 22, 1976	February 19, 1983	Rocky Mountain, Yellowhead	16th prime minister of Canada
	Erik Nielsen	February 19, 1983 (Interim)	June 11, 1983	Yukon	Interim leader
	Brian Mulroney	June 11, 1983	June 13, 1993	Central Nova, Manicouagan, Charlevoix	18th prime minister of Canada
	Kim Campbell	June 13, 1993	December 14, 1993	Vancouver Centre	19th prime minister of Canada
	Jean Charest	December 14, 1993	April 2, 1998	Sherbrooke	5th deputy prime minister of Canada and 29th premier of Quebec
	Elsie Wayne	April 2, 1998 (Interim)	November 14, 1998	Saint John	Interim leader
	Joe Clark	November 14, 1998	May 31, 2003	Kings—Hants, Calgary Centre	
	Peter MacKay	May 31, 2003	December 7, 2003	Pictou—Antigonish—Guysborough	

=== Party leaders in the Senate ===
Name	Took office	Left office	Role
Charles Colquhoun Ballantyne	1942	1945	Opposition leader
John Thomas Haig	1945	1958	Opposition leader until June 20, 1957. Government leader from 1957 to 1958
Walter Morley Aseltine	1958	1962	Government leader
Alfred Johnson Brooks	1962	1967	Government leader until April 21, 1963; Opposition leader until 1967
Jacques Flynn	1967	1984	Opposition leader, except from June 3, 1979, to March 2, 1980, when he was government leader
Dufferin Roblin	1984	1986	Government leader
Lowell Murray	1986	1993	Government leader
John Lynch-Staunton	1993	2004	Opposition leader

== Party presidents ==
- James Macdonnell (1946–1950)
- George Nowlan (1950–1954)
- George Hees (1954–1956)
- Allister Grosart (1956–1963)
- Egan Chambers (1963–1964)
- Dalton Camp (1964–1969)
- Frank Moores (1969–1970)
- Nathan Nurgitz (1970–1971)
- Donald J. Matthews (1971–1974)
- Michael Meighen (1974–1977)
- Robert C. Coates (1977–1981)
- Peter Blaikie (1981–1983)
- Peter Elzinga (1983–1986)
- William H. Jarvis (1986–1989)
- Gerry St. Germain (1989–1995)
- Peter Van Loan (1999–2000)
- Jacques Leger (2000–2001)
- Bruck Easton (2001–2003)

== Election results ==
View source data.

Election	Leader	Votes	%	Seats	+/–	Position	Role	Government
1945	John Bracken	1,448,744	27.62%	64 / 245	▲27	2nd	Opposition	Liberal minority
1949	George A. Drew	1,734,261	29.62%	41 / 262	▼23	2nd	Opposition	Liberal majority
1953	George A. Drew	1,749,579	31.01%	50 / 265	▲9	2nd	Opposition	Liberal majority
1957	John Diefenbaker	2,564,732	38.81%	112 / 265	▲62	▲1st	Minority	PC minority
1958	John Diefenbaker	3,908,633	53.56%	208 / 265	▲96	1st	Majority	PC majority
1962	John Diefenbaker	2,865,542	37.22%	116 / 265	▼92	1st	Minority	PC minority
1963	John Diefenbaker	2,591,613	32.80%	93 / 265	▼23	▼2nd	Opposition	Liberal minority
1965	John Diefenbaker	2,500,113	32.41%	95 / 265	▲2	2nd	Opposition	Liberal minority
1968	Robert Stanfield	2,554,397	31.43%	72 / 264	▼23	2nd	Opposition	Liberal majority
1972	Robert Stanfield	3,388,980	35.02%	107 / 264	▲35	2nd	Opposition	Liberal minority
1974	Robert Stanfield	3,371,319	35.46%	95 / 264	▼12	2nd	Opposition	Liberal majority
1979	Joe Clark	4,111,606	35.89%	136 / 282	▲41	▲1st	Minority	PC minority
1980	Joe Clark	3,552,994	32.49%	103 / 282	▼33	▼2nd	Opposition	Liberal majority
1984	Brian Mulroney	6,278,818	50.03%	211 / 282	▲108	▲1st	Majority	PC majority
1988	Brian Mulroney	5,667,543	43.02%	169 / 295	▼42	1st	Majority	PC majority
1993	Kim Campbell	2,178,303	16.04%	2 / 295	▼167	▼5th	No status	Liberal majority
1997	Jean Charest	2,446,705	18.84%	20 / 301	▲18	5th	Fifth party	Liberal majority
2000	Joe Clark	1,566,994	12.19%	12 / 301	▼8	5th	Fifth party	Liberal majority

== See also ==
- Progressive Conservative leadership conventions
- Conservative Party of Canada (1867–1942)
- Conservative Party of Canada
- Conservative parties in Canada
- List of political parties in Canada
- Politics of Canada
- Prime Ministers of Canada
- Official Opposition (Canada)
