= Blue Tory =

Canadian libertarians

A Blue Tory in Canadian politics is a conservative who advocates for free-market libertarianism and economically conservative policies such as reductions in public spending, implementing tax cuts, opposition to deficit spending, and a more limited role of government. They also advocate self reliance, individual responsibility, personal freedom and liberty and therefore do not necessarily support social conservatism.

The term has been applied to members of the modern Conservative Party of Canada and provincial Progressive Conservative parties, including the Ontario PC Party, as well as the historical Reform Party of Canada and its successor, the Canadian Alliance. In contemporary language, Blue Tories are sometimes described as "true-blue Conservatives".

== History ==
For the first 50 years of Canada's existence as a country, the Conservative Party (also known as the "Tories") subscribed to policies that required the government to play an active role in the economy. The signature achievement of John A. Macdonald, Canada's first prime minister from 1867 to 1873 and from 1878 to 1891, was the National Policy, which nationalized industries and promoted high tariffs to protect domestic industries. The party strictly opposed free trade with the United States, and this vigorous opposition played a key role in the party's return to power under Robert Borden in 1911. As such, Blue Toryism was essentially non-existent in the Conservative Party during its governance of Canada from 1867 to 1873, 1878 to 1896, and from 1911 to 1921.

=== The Common Sense Revolution in Ontario ===
One example of a provincial Blue Tory government in Canada was the "Common Sense Revolution" provincial Progressive Conservative government of Ontario Premier Mike Harris. The Harris Tories were widely viewed as radical by Canadian standards in their economic policies and style of governance. Harris' government embarked on a number of initiatives, including cuts to education, welfare and Medicare, privatization of government services and health care, the sale of provincial highways and the forced amalgamation of municipalities. Provincial income taxes were also cut by 30% and corporate tax rates were nearly cut in half during the Harris mandate.

=== Harper era (2006–2015) ===
Federally, the most popular example of a Blue Tory government was that of Stephen Harper, who was prime minister from 2006 to 2015. Tax cuts were prevalent during Harper's tenure; he reduced the goods and services tax (GST) from seven percent to five percent; reduced the corporate income tax rate from 21 percent to 15 percent; and implemented personal income tax cuts during the Great Recession. Other fiscally conservative policies from the Harper government included the privatization of the Canadian Wheat Board, the negotiation of free-trade agreements such as the Comprehensive Economic and Trade Agreement (CETA), and the introduction of the tax-free savings account (TFSA). In order to balance the budget, Harper implemented various public spending cuts during his third term in office (2011–2015); one notable change was the increase in eligibility for Old Age Security from 65 years of age to 67, though this planned change did not go into effect as it was subsequently reversed by the succeeding Liberal government of Justin Trudeau in 2015.

Most Blue Tories are at least somewhat ideologically aligned close to the economic positions of the former Canadian Alliance; as such, they supported the "Unite the Right" merger between the PCs and the Alliance to form the new federal Conservative Party of Canada (CPC).

== Notable adherents ==
Notable Blue Tories include:

- Mike Harris, Premier of Ontario (1995–2002)
- Stephen Harper, Prime Minister of Canada (2006–2015)
- Ralph Klein, Premier of Alberta (1992–2006)
- Preston Manning, former leader of the Reform Party
- Pierre Poilievre, Leader of the Conservative Party (2022–present)

== See also ==
- Conservatism in Canada
- Fiscal conservatism
- Red Tory
- Wets and dries, similar factionalism in the Conservative Party (UK)
- Small-c conservative
- Blue Grit
