= Broadview Press =

Canadian publisher

- Founded: 1985; 41 years ago
- Founder: Don LePan
- Country of origin: Canada
- Headquarters location: Peterborough, Ontario
- Distribution: Self-distribution (North America); Eurospan Group (Europe, Asia, Africa, South America); Footprint Books (Australia)
- Publication types: Books
- Imprints: Freehand Books
- Official website: broadviewpress.com

Broadview Press is an independent academic publisher that focuses on the humanities. Founded in 1985 by Don LePan, the company now employs over 30 people, has over 800 titles in print, and publishes approximately 35 titles each year. Broadview's offices are located across Canada in Calgary, Peterborough, Nanaimo, Guelph and Wolfville.

== History ==
In its early years, Broadview operated out of LePan's home in Peterborough, Ontario, publishing a small number of titles for both Trade and academic markets. With the publication of books such as The Broadview Anthology of Poetry, The Broadview Reader, and the first few titles in the Broadview Editions series in the early 1990s, Broadview began to focus exclusively on the academic market.

In May 2008, Broadview's social science and history lists were sold to the University of Toronto Press. Michael Harrison (Broadview Vice-president 1992–2004, and President 2005–2008) and several staff members went on to form the Higher Education division at that press. Broadview refocused on the core disciplines of English Studies and Philosophy, and LePan returned to the role of President and CEO. In 2013, Leslie Dema was appointed president and became responsible for most aspects of the company's operations (with LePan remaining CEO but increasingly focused on a limited number of anthology projects). Dema led the company through a period of unprecedented technological change, and through the upheaval of the pandemic of the early 2020s. She resigned in 2023 to pursue a career in university administration; Stephen Latta, who had served for many years as Broadview's Philosophy Editor, was appointed president in July 2023, with Marjorie Mather appointed Vice President (Editorial and Production) and Christine Handley appointed Vice President (Sales and Distribution).

Broadview Press Ltd., the corporate predecessor of today's Broadview Press Inc., was incorporated September 25, 1985; the company is celebrating its 40th anniversary in 2025.

== Publishing program ==
Broadview publishes anthologies, scholarly editions of literary texts and philosophical classics, works of criticism, and other academic books.

The publisher is perhaps best known for its publications in English Literature (see below), but it has also published notable titles in a number of other areas. A particular area of strength is undergraduate philosophy course texts; notable titles include Andrew Bailey's First Philosophy: Fundamental Problems and Readings in Philosophy, William Hughes, Jonathan Lavery & Katheryn Doran's Critical Thinking, and The Broadview Anthology of Social and Political Thought. The Broadview philosophy list also includes many titles intended both for an academic and for a general readership; notable examples include Robert Martin's There Are Two Errors in the the Title of This Book, Bernard Suits' The Grasshopper: Games, Life and Utopia, Brian Orend's The Morality of War, and Wendy Lynne Lee's Contemporary Feminist Theory and Activism.

While primarily active in English Studies and Philosophy, Broadview has also published in other Humanities and Social Sciences disciplines, among them History and Political Science.

The following academics are counted among the authors on the Broadview list: Jeffrey N. Cox, Thomas Hurka, Will Kymlicka, Roy Liuzza, Christopher Looby, Jerome J. McGann, A.P. Martinich, Anne K. Mellor, Koritha Mitchell,Tilottama Rajan, John Sutherland and Susan Wolfson.

=== Broadview Editions series ===
The Broadview Editions series includes many titles long regarded as classics, as well as many valuable, lesser-known works. Each edition is newly edited, annotated, and includes an introduction, chronology, and bibliography. The series is distinguished by the inclusion of primary source documents contemporaneous with the work that help demonstrate the context out of which the work emerged. The inclusion of such materials was pioneered by D.L. Macdonald and Kathleen Scherf in their 1992 edition of Frankenstein; the inclusion of contextual materials soon became a feature of all titles in the series.

There are over 350 titles in the series, including acclaimed editions of canonical titles such as The Canterbury Tales; Jane Eyre and Groundwork for the Metaphysics of Morals. Editions of lesser-known authors such as British writers Eliza Haywood and Charlotte Smith, as well as American writers such as Leonora Sansay and Henry Fuller, are also highly regarded.

=== The Broadview Anthology of British Literature ===
The Broadview Anthology of British Literature is a competitor to the long-established Norton Anthology of English Literature. The Broadview has acquired a strong reputation that in many ways parallels that of the Broadview Editions series; like the Broadview Editions, the anthology includes a wide range of contextual materials. It was first published in 2006 and it is widely used in British Literature survey courses.

=== Freehand Books ===
Freehand Books was launched by Broadview in 2008 as a literary imprint, with a mandate to publish aesthetically diverse Canadian writing both by established authors and by new voices.

One of the titles published in Freehand's first season, Good To A Fault by Marina Endicott, won the Commonwealth Writers Prize Best Book Award, Canada and the Caribbean and was shortlisted for the Scotiabank Giller Prize.

In 2013, Personals, the first book of poetry by Ian Williams, was short-listed for the Griffin Poetry Prize.

In 2016 Freehand became independent, under the ownership of novelist and bookstore-owner JoAnn McCaig. The company was sold to Glenn Rollans in 2021.

=== Corporate Governance ===
Broadview is an incorporated private company, with over two dozen shareholders; its operations are governed by a board of directors.
