= Canadian nationalism =

Flag of Canada

Canadian nationalism (French: Nationalisme canadien) has been a significant political force since the 19th century and has typically manifested itself as seeking to advance Canada's independence from the influence of the United Kingdom and United States. Since the 1960s, most proponents of Canadian nationalism have advocated a form of civic nationalism that seeks to equalize citizenship for Canada's multicultural society. In particular, proponents seek to unite English-speaking Canadians with the Québécois and other French-speaking Canadians, who historically faced cultural and economic discrimination and assimilationist pressure from the English Canadian–dominated federal government. Canadian nationalism became an important issue during the 1988 federal election that focused on the then proposed Canada–United States Free Trade Agreement, which Canadian nationalists opposed on the basis that it would in their view lead to the inevitable assimilation and domination of Canada by the United States.

During the 1995 Quebec referendum to determine whether Quebec would become a sovereign state or remain in Canada, Canadian nationalists and federalists supported the "no" side while Quebec nationalists supported the "yes" side, resulting in a razor-thin majority in favour of the "no" side.

Canadian nationalism in English-speaking Canada opts for a certain level of sovereignty for Canada vis-à-vis other sovereign states, while remaining within the Commonwealth of Nations (former British Empire). The Canadian Tories have historically exemplified this formulation of nationalism in their opposition to free trade with the United States, stemming from a fear of economic and cultural assimilation. On the other hand, French Canadian nationalism prioritizes the preservation of the Québécois nation. This French-Canadian nationalism has existed ever since the conquest of New France in the mid-eighteenth century.

Although radical French-speaking reformers in the Lower Canada Rebellion of 1837 supported the creation of a new Québécois republic, a more accurate portrait of French-Canadian nationalism is illustrated by such figures as Henri Bourassa during the first half of the twentieth century. Bourassa advocated for a nation less reliant on Great Britain whether politically, economically or militarily. After Bourassa and during the Quiet Revolution, French-Canadian nationalism in Quebec evolved into Quebec nationalism. Quebec nationalists include sovereigntists, who believe Quebec should secede from Canada, and autonomists, who believe Quebec should hold extensive self-governing power within Canada.

== History ==
The goal of all economic and political nationalists has been the creation and then maintenance of Canadian sovereignty. During Canada's colonial past there were various movements in both Upper Canada (present day Ontario) and Lower Canada (present day Quebec) to achieve independence from the British Empire. These culminated in the failed Rebellions of 1837. These movements had republican and pro-American tendencies and many of the rebels fled to the United States following the failure of the rebellion.

Afterwards Canadian patriots began focusing on self-government and political reform within the British Empire. This was a cause championed by early Liberals such as the Reform Party and the Clear Grits, while Canada's early Conservatives, supported by loyalist institutions and big business, supported stronger links to Britain. Following Confederation in 1867, both of Canada's main parties followed separate nationalistic themes. The early Liberal Party of Canada generally favoured greater diplomatic and military independence from the British Empire while the early Conservative Party of Canada fought for economic independence from the United States.

=== Free trade with the United States ===
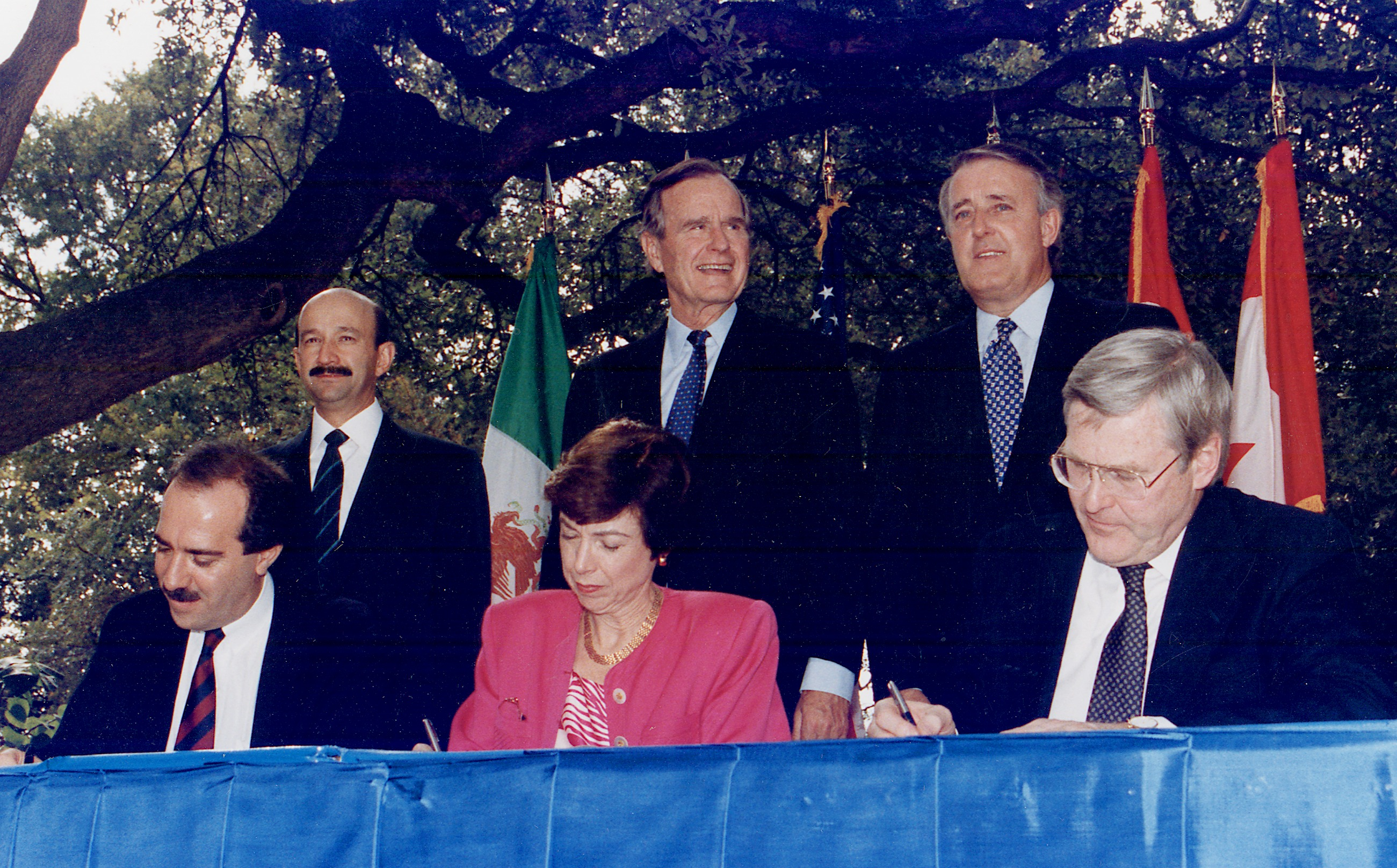
Representatives of the governments of Canada, Mexico, and the United States sign the North American Free Trade Agreement (NAFTA) in 1992

Starting before Confederation in 1867, the debate between free trade and protectionism was a defining issue in Canadian politics. Nationalists, along with pro-British loyalists, were opposed to the idea of free trade or reciprocity for fear of having to compete with American industry and losing sovereignty to the United States. This issue dominated Canadian politics during the late 19th and early 20th centuries with the Tories taking a populist, anti-free trade stance. Conservative leader John A. Macdonald advocated an agenda of economic nationalism, known as the National Policy. This was very popular in the industrialized Canadian east. While the Liberal Party of Canada took a more classical liberal approach and supported the idea of an "open market" with the United States, something feared in eastern Canada but popular with farmers in western Canada. The National Policy also included plans to expand Canadian territory into the western prairies and populate the west with immigrants.

In each "free trade election", the Liberals were defeated, forcing them to give up on the idea. The issue was revisited in the 1980s by Progressive Conservative Prime Minister Brian Mulroney. Mulroney reversed his party's protectionist tradition, and, after claiming to be against free trade during his leadership campaign in 1983, went forward with negotiations for a free trade agreement with the United States. His government believed that this would cure Canada's ills and unemployment, which had been caused by a growing deficit and a terrible economic recession during the late 1980s and early 1990s. The agreement was drawn up in 1987 and an election was held on the issue in 1988. The Liberals, in a reversal of their traditional role, campaigned against free trade under former Prime Minister John Turner. The Tories won the election with a large majority, partially due to Mulroney's support in Quebec among Quebec nationalists to whom he promised "distinct society" status for their province.

After the election of 1988, opponents of free trade pointed to the fact that the PC Party of Brian Mulroney received a majority of seats in parliament with only 43% of the vote while together the Liberal Party and New Democratic Party both of whom opposed the agreement received 51% of the vote, showing opposition from a clear majority of the population.

=== World Wars ===
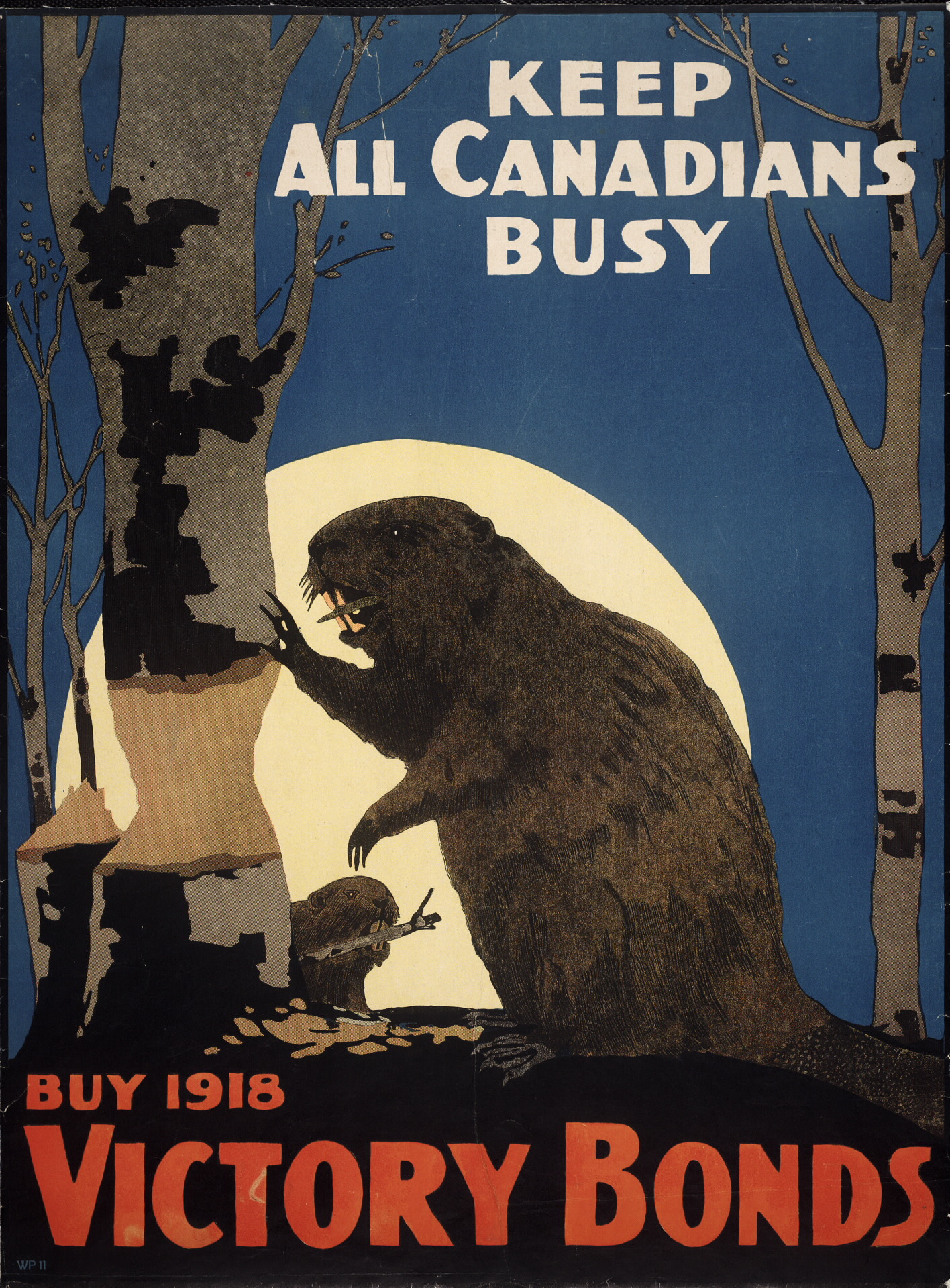
"Keep All Canadians Busy Buy 1918 Victory Bonds"

The impact of World War I on the evolution of Canada's identity is debated by historians. While there is a consensus that on the eve of the war, most English-speaking Canadians had a hybrid imperial-national identity, the war's effects on Canada's emergence as a nation are complex. The Canadian media often refers to the First World War and, in particular, the Battle of Vimy Ridge, as marking "the birth of a nation." Some historians consider the First World War to be Canada's "war of independence." They argue that the war decreased the extent to which Canadians identified with the British Empire and intensified their sense of being Canadians first and British subjects second.

This sense was expressed during the Chanak crisis when, for the first time, the Canadian government stated that a decision by the British government to go to war would not automatically entail Canadian participation.

Other historians robustly dispute the view that World War I undermined the hybrid imperial-national identity of English-speaking Canada. Phillip Buckner states that: "The First World War shook but did not destroy this Britannic vision of Canada. It is a myth that Canadians emerged from the war alienated from, and disillusioned with, the imperial connection." He argues that most English-speaking Canadians "continued to believe that Canada was, and should continue to be, a 'British' nation and that it should cooperate with the other members of the British family in the British Commonwealth of Nations." Nevertheless, there are two possible mechanisms whereby World War I may have intensified Canadian nationalism:

1. Pride in Canada's accomplishments on the battlefield demonstrably promoted Canadian patriotism, and
2. the war distanced Canada from Britain in that Canadians reacted to the sheer slaughter on the Western Front by adopting an increasingly anti-British attitude.

Still, Governor General The Lord Tweedsmuir raised the ire of Canadian imperialists when he said in Montreal in 1937: "a Canadian's first loyalty is not to the British Commonwealth of Nations, but to Canada and Canada's King." The Montreal Gazette dubbed the statement "disloyal."

=== Québécois nationalism ===
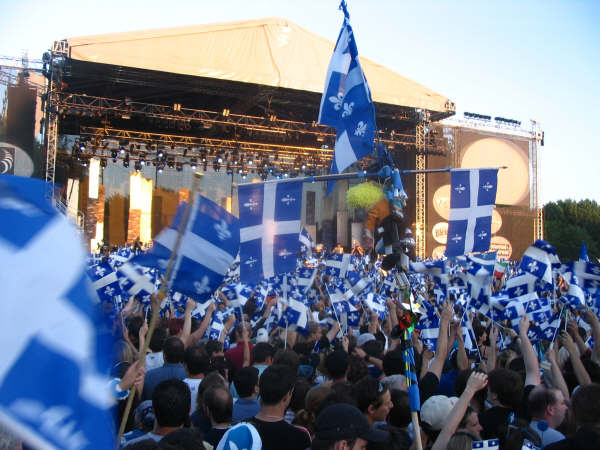
Fête Nationale du Québec (or Saint-Jean-Baptiste Day) celebrated here in June 2006

Another early source of pan-Canadian nationalism came from Quebec in the early 20th century. Henri Bourassa, Mayor of Montebello and one-time Liberal Member of Parliament created the Canadian Nationalist League (Ligue nationaliste canadienne) supporting an independent role for Canada in foreign affairs and opposed Canadian dependence on either Britain or the United States. A prominent supporter of a complete "economic autonomy" of the Canadian economy, Bourassa was instrumental in defeating Wilfrid Laurier in the federal election of 1911 over the issue of a Canadian Navy under the command of the British Admiralty, something he furiously opposed. In so doing, he aided the Conservative Party of Robert Borden in that election, a party with strong pro-imperialist sympathies.

In the federal election of 1917 he was also instrumental in opposing the Borden government's plan for conscription and as a result assisted the Laurier Liberals in Quebec. His vision of a unified, bi-cultural, tolerant and sovereign Canada remains an ideological inspiration to many Canadian nationalists. Alternatively, his French Canadian nationalism and support for maintaining French Canadian culture would inspire Quebec nationalists, many of whom were supporters of the Quebec sovereignty movement.

This Quebec sovereignty movement gained traction through the Quiet Revolution and burst on the Canadian scene in the latter half of the twentieth century. In 1970, radical sovereigntists under the FLQ sparked the October Crisis when they kidnapped the provincial Labour Minister Pierre Laporte and British diplomat James Cross in an effort to further the cause of Quebec sovereignty. Although this crisis soon abated, the sovereignty movement continued. Quebec held two referendums about whether the province should separate from the rest of Canada; the Canadian federalists defeated the Québécois separatists in the 1980 Quebec referendum by a margin of 59.56% to 40.44% and narrowly won again in the 1995 Quebec referendum by a margin of 50.58% to 49.42%. This second referendum marked the high water mark of the Quebec sovereignty movement and the broader Québécois nationalism continued to decline in the early twenty-first century.

Under the Coalition Avenir Québec government, Québécois nationalism has risen in a new form. In 2019, the provincial government passed Act respecting the laicity of the State. It prohibits the wearing of religious symbols by certain public employees in positions of authority and grandfathers in those who were already in office when the bill was introduced. In 2022, the provincial government introduced An Act respecting French, the official and common language of Quebec which would greatly expand the requirement to speak French in many public and private settings. The government has justified both of these measures, which are strongly opposed in the English-speaking provinces, as necessary to preserve the secularism and the French language that are central to Québécois nationalism.

=== Nationalist politics ===
Modern attempts at forming a popular Canadian nationalist party have failed, a phenomenon decried by Canadian philosopher George Grant in his seminal 1965 Lament for a Nation. Grant's thesis is that Prime Minister Diefenbaker's defeat in 1963 was the last gasp of Canadian nationalism and that the Canadian nation has succumbed to the continentalism of the United States.

The National Party of Canada was the most successful of recent attempts to revive Canadian nationalism in an electoral party. Led by former publisher Mel Hurtig, the Nationals received more than 183,000 votes or 1.38% of the popular vote in the 1993 election. Infighting however, led to the party's demise shortly afterwards. This was followed by the formation of the Canadian Action Party in 1997. Created by a former Liberal Minister of Defence, Paul Hellyer, the CAP has failed to attract significant attention from the electorate since that time. An organic farmer and nationalist activist from Saskatchewan named David Orchard attempted to bring a nationalist agenda to the forefront of the former Progressive Conservative Party of Canada. In spite of attracting thousands of new members to a declining party, he was unsuccessful in taking over the leadership and preventing the merger with the former Canadian Alliance.

Various activist/lobby groups such as the Council of Canadians, along with other progressive, environmentalist and labour groups have campaigned tirelessly against attempts to integrate the Canadian economy and harmonize government policies with that of the United States. They point to threats allegedly posed to Canada's environment, natural resources, social programs, the rights of Canadian workers and cultural institutions. These echo the concerns of a large segment of the Canadian population. The nationalist Council of Canadians took a role of leadership in protesting discussions on the Security and Prosperity Partnership and earlier talks between previous Canadian and US governments on "deep integration".

As of 2010, concerns regarding national unity have ebbed to some degree and nationalist sentiment among the population overall has increased. Even in Quebec, long a hotbed of secessionist sentiment, a large majority has emerged that expresses pride and loyalty toward Canada as a whole. Canada has even been described as post-national, a description that some critics have argued runs counter to current trends in Europe and the United States. Prime Minister Trudeau, elected in 2015, has however espoused distinctly anti-nationalist sentiments during his tenure (or at least sentiments that are contrary to traditional nationalism). To the extent Canadians have embraced nationalism in recent years, it has been a more inclusive, civic nationalism, as contrasted with the exclusive nationalism that has arisen recently in the US, UK, and some other Western nations.

== List of Canadian nationalist groups ==
=== Centre-left, left-wing and far-left groups ===
- Canadian Action Party (1997–2017), minor federal political party
- Committee for an Independent Canada (1970–1981), political advocacy organization
- The Council of Canadians (1985–present), political advocacy organization
- Ginger Group (1924–1930s), informal group of left-wing members of parliament
- National Party of Canada (1993–1997), minor federal political party
- The Waffle (1969–1974), also known as the Movement for an Independent Socialist Canada, a far-left faction of the New Democratic Party which was purged by federal party leader David Lewis in the 1970s
- National Party of Canada, minor federal political party founded by former Waffle members

=== Centrist groups ===
- Canadian Future Party (2024–present), minor federal political party

=== Centre-right, right-wing and far-right groups ===
- Canada First (1868–c. 1896), political advocacy organization which was briefly a minor federal political party
- Canadian Party (1862–1872), political advocacy organization local to Manitoba
- Dominion Society of Canada (2025–present), political advocacy organization
- National Citizens Alliance (2014–2023), minor federal political party
- People's Party of Canada (2018–present), minor federal political party
- Progressive Canadian Party (2004–2019), minor federal political party

=== Canadian government departments responsible for cultural promotion ===
- Department of Canadian Heritage
- Heritage Canada Foundation
- Canada Council for the Arts

== National pride ==
Nearly nine out of ten individuals (87%) expressed a sense of pride in identifying as Canadian, with over half (61%) indicating they were very proud. The highest levels of pride were associated with Canadian history as a dominion of the British Empire (70%), the armed forces (64%), the healthcare system (64%), and the Canadian Constitution (63%). Conversely, pride was lowest concerning Canada’s global political influence, reported at 46%.

Outside of Quebec, pride in Canadian identity varied, ranging from 91% in British Columbia to 94% in Prince Edward Island. In Quebec, 70% of individuals conveyed feelings of pride or strong pride in their Canadian identity, although Quebec residents were consistently less inclined to express pride in particular Canadian accomplishments.

The sentiments of pride in being Canadian were most pronounced among seniors and women, although this pride did not necessarily translate to specific aspects of Canadian life, such as the healthcare system. First-generation and second-generation immigrants exhibited the highest levels of pride in both their Canadian identity and Canadian accomplishments.

== See also ==
- Canadian patriotic music
- Canadian Red Ensign
- Canadian cultural protectionism
- Canadianism
- Chinese Immigration Act of 1885
- Chinese head tax in Canada
- Chinese Immigration Act, 1923
- Immigration Watch Canada
- Multiculturalism in Canada
- Populism in Canada
