= Pierre Chauveau Medal =

- Awarded for: "a distinguished contribution to knowledge in the humanities other than Canadian literature and Canadian history"
- Date: Biennially
- Country: Canada
- Presented by: Royal Society of Canada
- First award: 1952
- Website: rsc.ca

The Pierre Chauveau Medal is a biennial award of the Royal Society of Canada "for a distinguished contribution to knowledge in the humanities other than Canadian literature and Canadian history".

The award consists of a silver medal and is named in honour of Pierre-Joseph-Olivier Chauveau (1820–1890), who was a Canadian lawyer, writer, orator, educator and statesman. He was the second President of the Royal Society of Canada and the first Premier of the Canadian province of Quebec following the establishment of the Dominion of Canada in 1867.

== Recipients ==
- 2025 - Eric Jennings
- 2023 - Tilottama Rajan
- 2021 - Will Kymlicka, FRSC
- 2019 - Lynne Viola, FRSC
- 2017 - Claire Lefebvre, MSRC
- 2015 - Keren Rice
- 2013 - James Carley
- 2011 - Robert Ladouceur
- 2010 - John Peter Oleson, FRSC
- 2005 - Shana Poplack, FRSC
- 2003 - Gilles Bibeau, MSRC
- 2001 - Paul-Hubert Poirier, MSRC
- 1999 - Michael Millgate, FRSC
- 1997 - Jacques Henripin, MSRC
- 1995 - Vaïra Vìkis-Freibergs, MSRC
- 1993 - Bernard Beugnot, MSRC
- 1991 - Guy Rocher, MSRC
- 1989 - John M. Robson, FRSC
- 1987 - Benoît Lacroix, MSRC
- 1985 - Erich B. Von Richthofen, FRSC
- 1983 - Balachandra Rajan
- 1981 - George P. Grant, FRSC
- 1979 - Kathleen Coburn
- 1976 - Edward Togo Salmon
- 1974 - Wilfred Cantwell Smith
- 1972 - Louis-Edmond Hamelin, MSRC
- 1970 - Northrop Frye
- 1968 - B. Wilkinson
- 1966 - Louis-Philippe Audet
- 1965 - Robert Charbonneau
- 1964 - Léo-Albert Lévesque
- 1963 - Arthur Maheux
- 1962 - Maurice Lebel, MSRC
- 1961 - Gérard Malchelosse
- 1960 - F.C.A. Jeanneret, MSRC
- 1959 - Harry Bernard
- 1957 - Claude Melançon
- 1956 - Victor Morin
- 1955 - Jean-Marie Gauvreau
- 1954 - Gérard Morisset
- 1953 - B. K. Sandwell
- 1952 - Pierre Daviault
