= Cecil Dreeme =

1861 novel by Theodore Wintrop

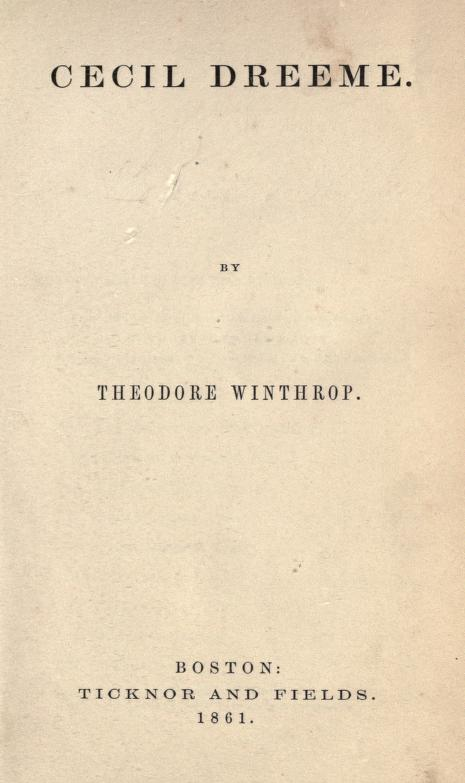
Title page of Cecil Dreeme, 1861

Cecil Dreeme is a novel written by Theodore Winthrop and published posthumously by the author's friend George William Curtis in 1861, after the author's death at the battle of Big Bethel on June 10, 1861. (The Battle of Big Bethel was one of the earliest land battles of the American Civil War which took place on the Virginia Peninsula, near Newport News.) The novel has been called "one of the queerest American novels of the nineteenth century" by scholar Peter Coviello, and it addresses themes of gender and sexuality.

== Synopsis ==
Robert Byng has recently returned from his Grand Tour of Europe to settle in New York City. An old friend lends Byng his rooms at Chrysalis College (an equivalent of real-life New York University, perhaps also partially modelled on the Tenth Street Studio Building). It is there that Byng meets his mysterious and reclusive neighbor Cecil Dreeme, and the two strike up what scholars such as Axel Nissen have identified as a romantic friendship. However, Byng is also tempted by the villainous Densdeth, who seems to want the protagonist to fall into a life of unspecified sin and debauchery. Eventually, Densdeth is defeated, and the evil man dies in Byng’s arms while Byng remarks, “There was the man whom I should have loved if I had not hated.” It is finally revealed that Cecil Dreeme, Byng’s friend “closer than a brother,” has actually been a woman in disguise all along, also hiding from Densdeth’s villainy.

== Reception ==
Though the novel quickly went through seventeen editions and received positive reviews in the first three years after its publication, it faded into obscurity in the latter half of the nineteenth century and remained relatively unknown until it was republished in 2016. Two editions were released that year, one by New York University Press with an introduction by Peter Coviello and one by University of Pennsylvania Press with an introduction by Christopher Looby. Both of these republications drew attention to what to what they considered to be the novel’s ‘queer themes’.
