= George Grant (philosopher) =

Canadian philosopher (1918–1988)

George Grant OC FRSC
- Born: George Parkin Grant; 13 November 1918; Toronto, Ontario, Canada
- Died: 27 September 1988 (aged 69); Halifax, Nova Scotia, Canada
- Spouse: Sheila Allen (m. 1947)

Academic background
- Education: Queen's University; Balliol College, Oxford
- Thesis: The Concept of Nature and Supernature in the Theology of John Oman (1950)
- Influences: Georg Wilhelm Friedrich Hegel; Friedrich Nietzsche; Martin Heidegger; Leo Strauss; Simone Weil; Jacques Ellul; James Doull; Michael B. Foster

Academic work
- Discipline: Philosophy; religious studies
- School or tradition: Canadian nationalism; continental philosophy; Platonism; Red Toryism
- Institutions: Dalhousie University; York University; McMaster University
- Main interests: Continental philosophy; contractarianism; English civic tradition; Greek philosophy; history of philosophy; nihilism; philosophy of technology; political philosophy; politics; theology
- Notable works: Lament for a Nation (1965)
- Influenced: William Christian; Matt Cohen; Barry Cooper; Ron Dart; Douglas John Hall; James Laxer; Dennis Lee; John Milbank; A. James Reimer

George Parkin Grant OC FRSC (13 November 1918 – 27 September 1988) was a Canadian philosopher, university professor and social critic. He is known for his Canadian nationalism, a political conservatism that affirms the values of community, equality and justice and his critical, philosophical analysis of the social and political effects of limitless technological progress. As a practising Christian, Grant conceived of time as the moving image of an eternal order illuminated by love.

Many of his writings express a complex meditation on and dialogue with the great thinkers of Western civilization including the "ancients" such as Plato, Aristotle, and Augustine of Hippo as well as "moderns" such as Georg Wilhelm Friedrich Hegel, Friedrich Nietzsche, Martin Heidegger, Leo Strauss, James Doull, Simone Weil and Jacques Ellul. Grant distinguished between civilizations of antiquity in which people believed that sacred stories, rituals and myths revealed universal order and the civilizations of modernity that came into being with the rise of Western science, the rapid development of industrial technologies and the prevailing belief that human beings are free to create (or will) their own order.

"We can hold in our minds the enormous benefits of technological society, but we cannot so easily hold the ways it may have deprived us," Grant wrote, "because technique is ourselves." He argued that the technological society has destroyed "the very systems of meaning" along with the language that expressed the highest human purposes. "Our vision of ourselves as freedom in an indifferent world could only have arisen in so far as we had analyzed to disintegration those systems of meaning, given in myth, philosophy and revelation, which had held sway over our progenitors."

Grant vigorously opposed euthanasia, which he defined as "deliberately causing the death of someone who is not already dying," and abortion, except where the mother's life is in danger, or in psychologically traumatizing instances of rape, especially of young girls. In the case of abortion, he argued that a woman's right to choose one "can only be made law by denying to another member of our species the right to exist" and, in the case of euthanasia, he wrote that rather than killing patients, doctors can alleviate their pain and fear. He warned that legal access to euthanasia (or assisted suicide) and abortion on demand could result in the killing of people considered less human or less valuable such as the aged, handicapped or the infirm.

Although he is considered the main theoretician of red Toryism, he expressed dislike of the term when applied to his deeper philosophical interests, which he saw as his primary work as a thinker. Recent research on Grant uncovers his debt to a neo-Hegelian idealist tradition, Canadian idealism, that had a major influence on many Canadian scholars and Canadian political culture more broadly.

== Family ==
Grant was born in Toronto on 13 November 1918, the son of Maude Erskine (née Parkin) and William Lawson Grant. He came from a distinguished Canadian family of scholars and educators. His father was the principal of Upper Canada College, and his paternal grandfather George Monro Grant was the dynamic principal of Queen's University. His maternal grandfather was Sir George Robert Parkin, also a principal at Upper Canada College, whose daughter Alice married Vincent Massey, the Canadian diplomat and first Canadian-born Governor General of Canada. Both of his grandfathers were strong proponents of the bonds between Canada and the British Empire, and this greatly influenced their grandson. His nephew Michael Ignatieff is a public intellectual and former Leader of the Opposition in the Canadian House of Commons. His niece Caroline Andrew was a political scientist. On 1 July 1947 he married Sheila Allen whom he had met at Oxford.

== Education and teaching ==
Grant was educated at Upper Canada College and Queen's University from which he graduated with a history degree. He attended Balliol College at the University of Oxford on a Rhodes Scholarship, a trust his grandfather, George Parkin, had headed at one time. Upon winning the Rhodes Scholarship, he enrolled towards a degree in law at Oxford, but after the Second World War ended, and Grant had experienced a deeper personal engagement with Christianity, he decided to change studies. His Doctor of Philosophy research was interrupted by the war, and he was already teaching in Dalhousie University's philosophy department when he completed his thesis, The Concept of Nature and Supernature in the Theology of John Oman, during a year-long sabbatical in 1950. Grant was a faculty member at Dalhousie twice (1947–1960, 1980–1988), and at York University (1960–1961; he resigned before teaching) and McMaster University's religion department (1961–1980), which he founded and led in the 1960s and early 1970s. In 1977, he became an editorial advisor of the journal Dionysius, which published his essay "Nietzsche and the Ancients: Philosophy and Scholarship" in 1979.

In George Grant: A Biography his struggles as a self-taught philosopher are highlighted.

Grant was not readily accepted into the traditional academic community of scholars in Canada. Resistance was provoked by some of Grant's less "progressive" stances, most notably the definition of philosophy he published in 1949: "The study of philosophy is the analysis of the traditions of our society and the judgment of those traditions against our varying intuitions of the Perfections of God". Especially angered and upset was Fulton Anderson of the University of Toronto's philosophy department. Grant's definition is telling, in that it marks his take on philosophy's human perspective, which did not necessarily include assumptions regarding the objectivity of science, or the acceptance of the Enlightenment's fact–value distinction.

Throughout his career Grant was seen as a unique voice within academic institutions, and thus had strong appeal beyond the strict "community of scholars". In fact, Grant criticized the trend in universities to move away from the "unity" of the traditional academy to a "multi-versity" comprising separate hives of undergraduate students, graduate students, professional faculties, and professors (years before the American Allan Bloom would become famous for similar themes).

Grant died from pancreatic cancer on 27 September 1988, at the age of 69.

== Politics and philosophy ==
In 1965 Grant published his most widely known work, Lament for a Nation, in which he deplored what he claimed was Canada's inevitable cultural absorption by the United States, a phenomenon he saw as an instance of "continentalism". He argued that the homogenizing effect in current affairs during the period when it was written would see the demise of Canadian cultural nationality. The importance of the text is reflected in its selection in 2005 as one of The Literary Review of Canada's 100 most important Canadian books. Grant articulated a political philosophy which was becoming known as red Toryism. It promoted the collectivist and communitarian aspects of an older English conservative tradition, which stood in direct opposition to the individualist traditions of liberalism and subsequently neo-liberalism.

The subjects of his books, essays, public lectures, and radio addresses (many on CBC Radio in Canada) quite frequently combined philosophy, religion, and political thought. Grant strongly critiqued what he believed were the worst facets of modernity, namely unbridled technological advancement and a loss of moral foundations to guide humanity. He defined philosophy as the search for the "purpose and meaning and unity [of] life". What he proposed in place of the modern spirit was a synthesis of Christian and Platonic thought which embodied contemplation of the "good". It is a synthesis that was given form by his neo-Hegelian Canadian idealism, which had been a part of his upbringing (his grandfather had been student of John Caird and a close friend of John Watson) but only really took explicit form when he was introduced to Hegel's work by James Doull.

His first book, Philosophy in the Mass Age (1959), was his most explicitly Hegelian book. It began as a series of CBC lectures, and in it he posed the question of how human beings can reconcile moral freedom with acceptance of the view that an order exists in the universe beyond space and time. He applied a neo-Hegelian concept of history to the modern dilemma of reconciling freedom and order. He saw history as the progressive development of humanity's consciousness of freedom and argued that Canada's unique combination of British traditional institutions and American individualism put it at the forefront of this final stage of history. In 1965, furious that the Liberal government had agreed to accept nuclear weapons, he published Lament for a Nation. At this point, Grant had been influenced by Leo Strauss and his neo-Hegelian conception of historical progress became more restrained, losing the hope that we had reached or were on the verge of reaching the fullest consciousness of freedom. Lament for a Nation created a sensation with its argument that Canada was destined to disappear into a universal and homogeneous state whose centre was the United States. The idea of progress had lost its connection to our moral development and had been co-opted into a utilitarian mastery of nature to satisfy human appetites. Technology and Empire (1969), a collection of essays edited by poet and friend Dennis Lee, deepened his critique of technological modernity; and Time as History, his 1969 Massey Lecture, explained the worsening predicament of the West through an examination of the thought of Friedrich Nietzsche. Grant's works of the 1960s had a strong influence on the nationalist movement of the 1970s, though many of the New Left were uncomfortable with Grant's conservatism, his conventional Anglican Tory beliefs, Christian-Platonist perspective, and his uncompromising position against abortion.

Grant's last work was Technology and Justice (1986), which he prepared together with his wife, Sheila Grant. His three-decades-long meditation on French philosopher Simone Weil's works led to the conclusion that there were fundamental moral and spiritual flaws in Western civilization, consigning it to a fate of inevitable collapse. Nevertheless, Grant affirmed his belief that a better civilization could eventually replace it.

== Honours ==
In 1981, he was made an Officer of the Order of Canada for having "become a major force in Canadian intellectual life" and was also awarded the Royal Society of Canada's Pierre Chauveau Medal. He was also a fellow of the Royal Society of Canada.

In 1965 Grant's book Lament for a Nation: The Defeat of Canadian Nationalism was voted one of The Literary Review of Canada's 100 most important Canadian books.

== Archives ==
The George Grant fonds is held by Library and Archives Canada. The archival reference number is R4526; the former archival reference number is MG31-D75. The fonds consists of 6 metres of textual records, 25 photographs, and a small amount of other media. The description includes a finding aid.

== Works ==
- The Empire, Yes or No? Ryerson Press, (1945).
- Philosophy in the Mass Age. CBC, (1959)
- Lament for a Nation: The Defeat of Canadian Nationalism. McClelland & Stewart, (1965).
- Time as History. CBC, (1969).
- Technology and Empire : Perspectives on North America. Anansi, (1969)
- English-speaking Justice. Mount Allison University, (1974).
- Grant, G.P. (1976). "The Computer Does Not Impose on Us the Ways It Should Be Used". In W. Christian & S. Grant (Eds.), The George Grant Reader. Toronto, Ontario, Canada: University of Toronto Press
- Technology and Justice. Anansi, (1986).
- George Grant: selected letters edited, with an introduction by William Christian. University of Toronto Press, (1996).
- The George Grant Reader. William Christian and Sheila Grant (editors). University of Toronto Press, (1998)
- Collected Works of George Grant. Arthur Davis (editor). University of Toronto Press, (2000)

== See also ==
- American imperialism

Academic offices
Preceded by R. D. Laing	Massey Lecturer; 1969	Succeeded by George Wald
Awards
Preceded by Kathleen Coburn	Pierre Chauveau Medal; 1981	Succeeded by Balachandra Rajan
