= Douglas LePan =

Canadian diplomat, poet, novelist and professor (1914–1998)

Douglas Valentine LePan OC FRSC (25 May 1914 – 27 November 1998) was a Canadian diplomat, poet, novelist and professor of literature.

Born in Toronto, Ontario, LePan was educated at the University of Toronto, at Harvard (where he also taught briefly in the late 1930s), and at Merton College, Oxford. During the Second World War, he was on staff at the Canadian High Commission in London and then served in the Canadian Army as an artilleryman during the Italian campaign. He joined the Canadian diplomatic service in 1946, and during his years as a diplomat served in London (as special assistant to Lester Pearson in the late 1940s) and in Washington, as well as in Ottawa. He was formally in the employ of the Department of External Affairs until 1959, though for several years during that time he was seconded by the Department of Finance to serve as Secretary for the Royal Commission on Canada's Economic Prospects (the "Gordon Commission"); his work drafting the multi-volume Report of the commission was widely praised.

LePan left the diplomatic service in 1959 to return to academic life; he taught at Queen's University, Kingston, Ontario, and at the University of Toronto, where he was Principal of University College (1964–1970) and then University Professor and Senior Fellow at Massey College.

LePan's wartime experience with the Canadian Army in Italy inspired much of his poetry and one novel, The Deserter (1964). LePan is one of only a few people (Michael Ondaatje and George Bowering are two others) to have won the Governor General's Award both for poetry (1953 for The Net and the Sword) and fiction (1964 for The Deserter, in a highly controversial win over Margaret Laurence's The Stone Angel).

In 1982 LePan published his first volume of poetry in almost 30 years (Something Still to Find), and in 1990 he created something of a sensation with Far Voyages, a volume largely composed of gay love poetry.

LePan had married, in 1948 to the former Sarah Katharine Chambers; the two remained together until 1971, but the marriage was a difficult one, not least of all over issues relating to sexual orientation. The couple had two children; Nicholas Le Pan, the elder of the two, was for many years a senior civil servant in Canada's Department of Finance and served from 2001 to 2006 as Superintendent of Financial Institutions, while the younger, Don LePan, is founder and CEO of academic publishing house Broadview Press and the author of several novels.

LePan's 1989 book of memoirs Bright Glass of Memory recounts his involvement with several leading lights of the twentieth century, including John Maynard Keynes and T.S. Eliot. He was made an Officer of the Order of Canada in 1998; among his other awards were a Guggenheim Fellowship (1948), the Royal Society of Canada's Lorne Pierce Medal (1976), and several honorary degrees. He remains well known for his war poetry (long poems from the post-war period such as "Tuscan Villa" and "Elegy for the Romagna," as well as shorter, punchier 1980s poems such as "Below Monte Cassino" in which he recalled the events of a generation earlier); for his poems relating to the landscape of Georgian Bay in Ontario; for his love poems; and for lyric poems in which the poet's passion for the natural world is infused with the suggestion of homoerotic passion ("Coureurs de Bois," "A Country Without a Mythology"). His work has been included in many anthologies, including The Norton Anthology of Poetry, Canadian Literature in English: Texts and Contexts, The Harbrace Anthology of Poetry, The Broadview Anthology of Poetry, and Modern Canadian Poets.

== Selected works ==
- The Wounded Prince (1948)
- The Net and the Sword (1953)
- The Deserter (1964)
- Bright Glass of Memory (1979)
- Something Still To Find (1982)
- Weathering It: Complete Poems 1948-1987 (1987)
- Far Voyages (1990)
- Macalister, or Dying in the Dark (1995)
