= William Christian (political scientist) =

William Edward Christian (born 1945 in Queen Charlotte Islands, British Columbia) was a political scientist at the University of Guelph. He retired in 2008. Educated at the University of Toronto (BA, MA) and the London School of Economics (PhD), he is best known academically for his research and teaching in Canadian political thought.

Beginning in 1970, he taught at the Mount Allison University. He joined the faculty at Guelph in 1978. His publications include biographies of George Grant and Sir George Parkin, George Grant's grandfather, as well as topics ranging from the political and economic history of Canada (e.g., The Idea File of Harold Adams Innis), to a concern for the philosophical roots of the Western tradition (e.g., "Waiting for Grace: Philosophy and Politics in Plato's Republic"). In 1974, along with Colin Campbell, he published the first edition of Political Parties and Ideologies in Canada. The textbook distinguished the philosophical foundations of each political party by tracing its comparative tradition, policies, and leaders. In 2006, he and Campbell 'Canadianized' a leading American textbook on ideologies. Besides his academic concerns, he has contributed frequently to the Globe and Mail, the Toronto Star, the Guelph Mercury and the Waterloo Region Record.

== List of works ==
- Political Ideologies and the Democratic Ideal. (3rd Canadian edition) with Terence Ball and Richard Dagger. Toronto: Pearson, 2013.
- Parkin: Canada's Most Famous Forgotten Man. Toronto: Blue Butterfly Books, 2008.
- "Was George Grant a Red Tory?" Athens and Jerusalem: George Grant's Theology, Philosophy, and Politics. Angus, Ian, Ronald Dart and Randy Peg Peters (editors). University of Toronto Press, (2006)
- George Grant: A Biography . Toronto: University of Toronto Press, 1993
- "Waiting for Grace: Philosophy and Politics in Plato's Republic", Canadian Journal of Political Science, (March 1988).
- Political parties and ideologies in Canada : liberals, conservatives, socialists, nationalists. 3rd edition Toronto : McGraw-Hill Ryerson, 1990.
- "Parties, Leaders, and Ideologies in Canada." Toronto : McGraw-Hill Ryerson, 1996
- The Idea File of Harold Adams Innis introduced and edited by William Christian. Toronto : University of Toronto Press, 1980
- Innis on Russia : the Russia diary and other writingsedited with a preface by William Christian. -- Toronto : Harold Innis Foundation, 1981.
