= Tilottama (disambiguation) =

Tilottama is an Apsara (celestial nymph) described in Hindu mythology.

Tilottama may also refer to:

== People ==
- Tilottama Majumdar (born 1966), Indian Bengali-speaking novelist, short story writer, poet, lyricist, and essayist
- Tilottama Rajan

== Media ==
- Tilottama (1966 film), a 1966 Malayalam language film
- Tilottama (1951 film), a 1951 Telugu folklore film

== Places ==
- Tilottama, Rupandehi, a town in western Nepal
