= Lament for a Nation =

1965 political philosophy book by George Grant

- Author: George Grant
- Language: English
- Subject: Political philosophy
- Publisher: McGill-Queen's University Press
- Publication date: 1965
- Publication place: Canada
- Pages: 112
- ISBN: 978-0-88629-257-7

Lament for a Nation: The Defeat of Canadian Nationalism is a 1965 essay of political philosophy by Canadian philosopher George Grant. The essay examined the political fate of Prime Minister John Diefenbaker's Progressive Conservative government in light of its refusal to allow nuclear arms on Canadian soil and the Liberal Party's political acceptance of the warheads. The book became a bestseller and "inspired a surge of nationalist feeling" in Canada, evident in its recognition as one of The Literary Review of Canada's 100 most important Canadian books in 2005.

Although grounded in the particular examination of Diefenbaker's fate in the 1963 federal election, the analysis transcended Canadian politics, studying Canadian and US national foundations, Conservatism in the UK and North America, Canada's dual nature as a French and English nation, the fate of Western Enlightenment, and the philosophical analysis of citizenship in modern democracies.

== Content ==
According to Grant, Diefenbaker's position against the Bomarc was defeated by the Central Canadian establishment, who conspired with the Liberal Party to bring down Diefenbaker and diminish Canadian sovereignty. This was his lament; he felt there was an emerging Americanization of Canadians and Canadian culture due to the inability of Canadians to live outside of the hegemony of American liberal capitalism – and the technology that emanates from that system. He saw a trend occurring in Canada from one of nationalism to continentalism.

Grant suggested that the absorption of Canada into the United States was due in part to the idea of human progress as an inevitable force of a homogenizing nature, which occurs through the power of government, corporations, and technology. He notes that the idea of progress is often associated with improvement, that it is assumed that evolution will always be a positive change. He asserts that necessity and good are not the same thing and in his conclusion he ponders the good that can result from the erasure of boundaries between the two countries, such as increased access to material goods and more significantly the freedom offered by liberalism. Grant also argued that the media was used to enforce power structures rather than to convey factual data following the practice of empire.

Grant follows Diefenbaker's rise and fall noting that when his 1957 victory was due to his support by local businessmen who were threatened by large corporations, ironically, his later defeat would be due to the same reason, large corporations were offended by his opposition and concern with the people.

== Critical reception ==
Described as one of the seminal works of Canadian political thought, it discusses the influence of the United States via liberalism and technology on Canada – which Grant argued was traditionally a less liberal and more traditionally conservative entity and culture. Grant argued that Canada was doomed as a nation as was illustrated by the 1963 Bomarc Missile Program crisis. He predicted the end of Canadian nationalism, which for Grant meant a small-town, populist conception of Canada as a British North American alternative to American capitalism and empire, and a move towards continentalism.

In 1970, five years after the book was published, Grant admits it was written out of anger more than anything, yet also was a nostalgic reminiscence of the former uniqueness of Canada, because "Canada was once a nation with meaning and purpose".

In 2007, Michael Byers wrote a counter-argument entitled Intent for a Nation: What is Canada For?.

In 2015 Michael Enright stated that the book had "a profound impact on Canadian intellectual history".
