= Jeffrey N. Cox =

Jeffrey N. Cox is Distinguished Professor of English Literature at the University of Colorado Boulder. He is the author or editor of ten books and more than sixty essays. Cox specializes in English and European Romanticism, cultural theory, and cultural studies. He is a leading scholar of late eighteenth- to early nineteenth-century drama and theater; of the Cockney School of poets, which included, among others, John Keats, Percy Shelley, and Leigh Hunt; and of the poetry of William Wordsworth. Cox's early work helped spark a revival of interest in the drama of the romantic period. More recently, he has been part of a reconceptualization of so-called second generation romanticism, placing Keats, Shelley, and Byron more fully within their cultural context--and particularly within the intellectual circle around Leigh Hunt--and demonstrating the impact of the culture of the Napoleonic War years on these writers. He most recently published a book on the late poetry of Wordsworth, showing how the poet responds to his younger contemporaries.

== Education ==
Cox received his BA from Wesleyan University in 1975 and his Ph.D. from the University of Virginia in 1981.

== Service ==
Cox was a faculty member at Texas A&M University from 1981 until his appointment in 1998 as the Director of the Center for the Humanities and the Arts (CHA) at the University of Colorado Boulder. In 2006, Cox left the position of CHA Director to become the University's Associate Vice Chancellor of Faculty Affairs, a position he held until 2019. He also served as Vice Provost from 2013-2019 and as Chair of the Department of English from 2020-2023.

== Selected honors and awards ==
In 2008, Cox was selected to give a plenary address at the annual meeting of the North American Society for the Study of Romanticism (NASSR) at the University of Toronto. Cox received the Keats-Shelley Association Distinguished Scholar Award in 2009 for his work on the Keats-Shelley circle, and the 2011 meeting of NASSR at Brigham Young University acknowledged his book In the Shadows of Romance: Romantic Tragic Drama in Germany, England, and France for its "significant impact on the field" of Romanticism.

Selected honors and awards include:

- Marilyn Gaull Book Award, Wordsworth-Coleridge Association, for William Wordsworth, Second-Generation Romantic, 2022.
- Professor of Distinction, College of Arts & Sciences, University of Colorado Boulder, 2014.
- Distinguished Scholar Award, Keats-Shelley Association, 2009.
- Faculty Fellowship, CU Boulder, 2004–2005.
- South Central Modern Language Association Best Book Award, 2000.
- Scholarly and Creative Work Enhancement Grant, Texas A&M University, 1995.
- Research Fellow, Interdisciplinary Group for Historical Literary Study, Texas A&M University, 1994–1995.
- Association of Former Students Distinguished Teaching Award, Texas A&M University, 1990.
- Huntington-Exxon Research Award, Henry E. Huntington Library, 1986.

== Books authored ==
- William Wordsworth, Second-Generation Romantic: Contesting Poetry after Waterloo. Cambridge University Press, 2021. ISBN 978-1108837613
- Romanticism in the Shadow of War: Literary Culture in the Napoleonic War Years. Cambridge University Press, 2014. ISBN 978-1107071940
- Poetry and Politics in the Cockney School: Shelley, Keats, Hunt, and Their Circle. Cambridge University Press, 1998.
  Winner of the 2000 South Central Modern Language Association Best Book Award. Hardcover ISBN 978-0521631006, Paperback ISBN 978-0521604239
- In the Shadows of Romance: Romantic Tragic Drama in Germany, England, and France. Ohio University Press, 1987. ISBN 978-0821408582

== Books edited ==
- Keats's Poetry and Prose. Norton Critical Edition. Norton, 2008. ISBN 978-0393924916
- The Selected Writings of Leigh Hunt. Vols. 1 and 2: Periodical Essays: 1805–1821. Co-Edited with Greg Kucich. Pickering & Chatto, 2003. ISBN 978-1851967148
- The Broadview Anthology of Romantic Drama. Co-Edited with Michael Gamer. Broadview Press, 2003. ISBN 978-1551112985
- Slavery, Abolition and Emancipation: Writings in the British Romantic Period. Vol. 5: The Drama. Pickering and Chatto: 1999. ISBN 978-1851965137
- New Historical Literary Study. Co-Edited with Larry Reynolds. Princeton University Press, 1993. Hardcover ISBN 978-0691069906, Paperback ISBN 978-0691015460
- Seven Gothic Dramas, 1789-1825. Ohio University Press, 1992. Paperback edition, 1993. ISBN 978-0821410653

== Journal editions edited ==
- Guest Editor with Jill Heydt-Stevenson, Special Issue on “Romantic Cosmopolitanism.” European Romantic Review 16 (April 2005).
- Guest Editor, Special Issue on Gothic Drama. Gothic Studies 3.2 (August, 2001).
