= Omid Payrow Shabani =

Iranian philosopher

- Born: 1962; Iran
- Died: 2023 (aged 60–61); Toronto
- Awards: Andrew Mellon Postdoctoral Fellowship

Education
- Education: University of Ottawa (PhD), Carleton University (BA, MA)
- Thesis: Discourse Ethics, Power, and Legitimacy: The Ideal of Democracy and the Task of Critical Theory in Habermas (2000)
- Doctoral advisor: Will Kymlicka

Philosophical work
- Era: 21st century Philosophy
- Region: Western philosophy
- School: Continental
- Institutions: University of Guelph
- Main interests: political philosophy, post-Kantian philosophy, ethics
- Website: https://www.uoguelph.ca/arts/philosophy/people/omid-payrow-shabani

Omid A. Payrow Shabani (1962-2023) was an Iranian philosopher and Professor of Philosophy at the University of Guelph. Payrow Shabani was known for his expertise on constitutional patriotism, Iranian politics and Jürgen Habermas's philosophy. He was awarded an Andrew Mellon Postdoctoral Fellowship in 2002.

== Books ==
- Democracy, Power, and Legitimacy: Critical Theory of Jürgen Habermas, Toronto: University of Toronto Press, 2003
- Multiculturalism and the Law: A Critical Debate, University of Wales Press, March 2007.
- Introduction to Social and Political Philosophy, eds. Omid Payrow Shabani and Monique Deveaux, Oxford University Press, 2014

== See also ==
- Douglas Moggach
- Kantian ethics
