= Monique Deveaux =

Canadian philosopher

Education
- Education: University of Cambridge (PhD), McGill University (BA, MA)

Philosophical work
- Era: 21st century Philosophy
- Region: Western philosophy
- Institutions: University of Guelph; Williams College
- Main interests: political philosophy, ethics

Monique Deveaux is a Canadian philosopher. She is a Full Professor and Tier 1 Canada Research Chair in Ethics and Global Social Change at the University of Guelph. She is known for her research on poverty, cultural pluralism and global justice.

== Education ==
Deveaux completed her Bachelor of Arts and Master of Arts degrees in political theory from McGill University before enrolling at Cambridge University for her M.Phil. and PhD. Following her PhD, Deveaux became a postdoctoral research fellow at the Wiener Center for Social Policy at the John F. Kennedy School of Government at Harvard University.

== Career ==
=== Williams College ===
Upon completing her fellowship, Deveaux joined the faculty at Williams College as an assistant professor in political science in 1998. In this new role, she continued to write on issues of moral theory and eventually published her first book Cultural Pluralism and Dilemmas of Justice in 2000. In this book, Deveaux searches for a way to provide "justice amid diversity" by arguing for deliberative liberalism. Following this publication, Deveaux accepted a Radcliffe College fellowship from 2001 to 2002 where she developed and wrote her second book; Traditional Cultures and Liberal Constitutions. Upon returning to Williams College following her fellowship, she was named a 2002–03 Oakley Fellow for the fall semester. Deveaux was granted tenure at Williams in 2004. During her first three years as a tenured professor, Deveaux co-edited and published two books; Gender and Justice in Multicultural Liberal States and Sexual Justice/Cultural Justice. In these books, she explores the tensions between multicultural, liberal democracies and cultural and religious customs. Her first book, Gender and Justice in Multicultural Liberal States, received the 2008 C.B. Macpherson Prize. In 2010, Deveaux was promoted to the rank of full professor of political science.

=== University of Guelph ===
Deveaux left Williams College in 2010 to become a Tier 1 Canada Research Chair in Ethics and Global Social Change. In this role, she used a Social Sciences and Humanities Research Council grant to organize a conference on global ethics and fairness. In 2017, Deveaux was renewed as a Tier 1 Canada Research Chair.

== Books ==
- Poverty, Solidarity, and Poor-led Social Movements, Oxford University Press, 2021
- Gender and Justice in Multicultural Liberal States, Oxford University Press, 2006
- Cultural Pluralism and Dilemmas of Justice, Cornell University Press, 2000
- Exploitation: From Practice to Theory, Monique Deveaux and Vida Panitch (eds), Rowman & Littlefield, 2017
- Introduction to Social and Political Philosophy, Omid Payrow Shabani and Monique Deveaux (eds.), Oxford University Press, 2014
- Reading Onora O'Neill, M. Deveaux, D. Archard, D.Weinstock & N. Manson (eds.), Routledge, 2013
- Sexual Justice/Cultural Justice: Critical Perspectives in Political Theory & Practice, M. Deveaux, B.Arneil, R. Dhamoon, & A. Eisenberg (eds.), Routledge 2007

== See also ==
- Feminist ethics
