= Abraham Rotstein =

Canadian economist

- Born: April 10, 1929; Montreal, Canada
- Died: April 27, 2015 (aged 86); Toronto, Canada

Academic background
- Education: University of Toronto

Academic work
- Institutions: University of Toronto

Abraham Rotstein (10 April 1929 – 27 April 2015) was a Canadian economist who was a professor of economics at the University of Toronto. He was a fellow of Massey College. He is best known as a co-founder of the Committee for an Independent Canada. He received his doctorate from the University of Toronto in 1967 for the thesis Fur Trade and Empire: An Institutional Analysis. He was a student of Karl Polanyi.

Rotstein was married for much of his life to Diane, with whom he had two children. After his retirement from the University of Toronto, he came out as gay.

== Publications ==
=== Articles and addresses ===
- Rotstein, Abraham. "Foreign Ownership of Industry: A New Canadian Approach." The Round Table: The Commonwealth Journal of International Affairs , Vol. 58, No. 231 (July 1968): 260–268. doi:10.1080/00358536808452754
- Rotstein, Abraham. "Karl Polanyi's Concept of NonMarket Trade," The Journal of Economic History, Vol. XXX, March 1970, pp. 117–26
- Rotstein, Abraham. "Canada: The New Nationalism." Foreign Affairs, No. 55 (October 1976): 97–118.
- Rotstein, Abraham. "Is There a Canadian Nationalism?" In Goals for Canada: Walter L. Gordon Lecture Series, 1977–78. Toronto: Canada Studies Foundation, 1978.
- Rotstein, Abraham. "Is There an English-Canadian Nationalism?" Journal of Canadian Studies, Vol. 13, No. 2 (May 1978): 109–118. ISSN 0021-9495
- Rotstein, Abraham. "Innis: The Alchemy of Fur and Wheat "Journal of Canadian Studies/Revue d'études canadiennes, Volume 12, Number 5, Winter 1977, pp. 6–31

=== Books ===
- Rotstein, Abraham. Beyond Industrial Growth. Toronto: University of Toronto Press, 1976 ISBN 978-0-8020-6286-4
  - Review, Canadian Public Policy, Spring, 1978, vol. 4, no. 2, p. 271–272
  - Review, Contemporary Sociology: A Journal of Reviews, Jul., 1977, vol. 6, no. 4, p. 487–488
- Rotstein, Abraham, and Gary Lax. Getting It Back: A Program for Canadian Independence. Toronto: Clarke, Irwin, 1974. ISBN 978-0-7720-0694-3
- Rotstein, Abraham. The Precarious Homestead; Essays on Economics, Technology and Nationalism. Toronto: New Press, 1973. ISBN 978-0-88770-711-7
- Rotstein, Abraham, and Gary Lax. Independence: the Canadian Challenge. Toronto: Committee for an Independent Canada, 1972. ISBN 978-0-7710-7746-3
- Abraham Rotstein. The Prospect of Change: Proposals for Canada's Future. McGraw-Hill, 1965. OCLC 5778078
  - Reviewed by J R Mallory; International Journal, Autumn, 1965, vol. 20, no. 4, p. 548–549
