= Don LePan =

Canadian book publisher

Don LePan (born 1954 in Washington, DC) is widely known as a book publisher; he is the founder and CEO of the academic publishing house Broadview Press. He is also a painter and the author or editor of several books, most notably the dystopian novel Animals.

== Biography ==
LePan grew up in Ontario, living variously in Ottawa, Kingston, and Toronto. He received a BA in English Literature from Carleton University in Ottawa and an MA in Renaissance Studies from the University of Sussex, where he studied under A.D. Nuttall; his research on Shakespeare’s plots became the basis for a monograph (The Birth of Expectation). He worked for some years in the 1970s and 1980s for the Canadian branch of Oxford University Press (where he was manager of the College Department from 1979-1982), and from 1982-1985 as a secondary school teacher in rural Zimbabwe with the development agency WUSC. In 1985 he returned to Canada to found Broadview Press, a book publisher in the humanities and social sciences. By 2020 Broadview had grown to a company with annual revenues of over $4 million and a staff of 30. Though modest in size, the publishing house is held in high regard, particularly as a publisher of anthologies and literary editions; in 2004 LePan was awarded an honorary doctorate by Trent University in Peterborough, Ontario for his contribution to academic publishing. He stepped down as Broadview's CEO in October, 2026, though he remains a member of the company's Board of Directors.

LePan’s father, Douglas LePan, was well known as a poet and academic; his brother, Nicholas Le Pan, is well known as a Canadian civil servant (he is a former head of the Office of the Superintendent of Financial Institutions).

== Animals: A Novel and Other Works of Fiction ==
LePan’s Animals: A Novel is set in an indeterminate future in which virtually all the species that humans have used as food have become extinct; it tells the story of a "mongrel" child who is twice abandoned and then comes face to face with the equivalent in this future world of the factory farming of today. The novel was published in 2009 in Canada and in 2010 in the USA, to sparse but generally favorable newspaper reviews —and to widely diverging reactions elsewhere. Notably enthusiastic was a review in the University of Toronto Quarterly ("If you read nothing else from this year's batch of novels, ... read Animals". Few Canadian novels have been as powerful"). Others, however, have criticized the work as being "didactic" or "preachy." On his blog LePan has defended the notion that the aesthetic and moral need not be regarded as mutually exclusive—in his words, "it should not be assumed that a work that tries to do good cannot also be good."

LePan's second novel, Rising Stories (2015), a story of a child and their grandmother and of Chicago skyscrapers, which hovers between realism and fantasy, has been largely ignored; his third, Lucy and Bonbon (2022), which like Animals explores the lines that we draw between humans and other animals, has also attracted little attention.

== Watercolor Painting ==
As a painter, LePan has specialized in large watercolor cityscapes; a solo exhibition ("The Skyscraper and the City") was held in Brooklyn in 2008; a larger selection of these paintings (also entitled The Skyscraper and the City) has been published in a 2025 book.

== Selected works ==
- The Birth of Expectation. Macmillan Press, 1989. Paperback published by Broadview Press, 1996 (The Cognitive Revolution in Western Culture). ISBN 978-1-55111-081-3
- The Broadview Guide to Writing (co-author). Peterborough: Broadview Press, 6/e edition 2015. ISBN 978-1-55111-970-0
- The Broadview Anthology of British Literature (co-edited). Peterborough: Broadview Press, 1/e 2006 (six volumes).
- The Broadview Anthology of Expository Prose (co-edited). Peterborough: Broadview Press, 2/e edition 2011. ISBN 978-1-55481-037-6
- Animals: A Novel. Montreal: Véhicule Press, 2009. ISBN 1-59376-277-1. Berkeley: Soft Skull Press, 2010. ISBN 1-59376-277-1
- The Broadview Pocket Glossary of Literary Terms (co-author). Peterborough: Broadview Press, 2013. ISBN 978-1-554811670
- Rising Stories: A Novel. Nanaimo: Press Forward (distributed by Broadview Press), 2015. ISBN 978-0-9947474-0-2
- How to be Good with Words (co-author). Peterborough: Broadview Press, 2017. ISBN 978-1-554813254
- Lucy and Bonbon: A Novel. Toronto: MiroLand (Guernica), 2022. ISBN 978-1-77183-718-7
