= Koritha Mitchell =

American educator

Koritha Mitchell is a professor of African American literature at Boston University. She previously taught at the Ohio State University, and obtained her Ph.D. from the University of Maryland. In 2011, University of Illinois Press published her book on a study of African-Americans titled Living with Lynching: African American Lynching Plays, Performance, and Citizenship, 1890-1930 which won her numerous awards from the American Theatre & Drama Society and from the Society for the Study of American Women Writers respectively. In March 2012, American Quarterly published her essay James Baldwin, Performance Theorist, Sings the Blues for Mister Charlie. In March of the same year, she spoke on the podium at ColorLines about the death of Trayvon Martin and her book Living with Lynching. She also spoke about various African-American playwrights of the 20th century such as Alice Dunbar-Nelson, Angelina Weld Grimke, Mary Burrill, and Georgia Douglas Johnson. In 2018, she published "Identifying White Mediocrity and Know-Your-Place-Aggression: A Form of Self-Care," in the winter issue of the African American Review.
