= Committee for an Independent Canada =

Canadian political organization

The Committee for an Independent Canada (est. 1970) was a citizens' committee, founded to protect the country's economic and cultural independence. As such, it advocated for limits on foreign investment and content controls, some of which were eventually enshrined in law. Intent on "mobiliz[ing] public opinion behind a drive to curtail United States influence on Canadian life, the CIC has been described as "the centrepiece of the first wave of progressive Canadian nationalism after the war, uniting a large swath of the centre-left and splitting the governing Liberal Party." It "drew members from the general public, media and all political parties" and its activists "lobbied politicians, gave media interviews, distributed pamphlets, and organized conferences." Many of its ideas "were eventually made into government policy including the establishment of the Foreign Investment Review Committee, the Canadian Development Corporation, and Petro Canada."

Key figures included Abraham Rotstein, Peter C. Newman and Walter L. Gordon. In 1981 it dissolved. It was revealed in 2021 upon investigation by The Canadian Press that committee activities had been under Royal Canadian Mounted Police surveillance.
