= Ron Dart =

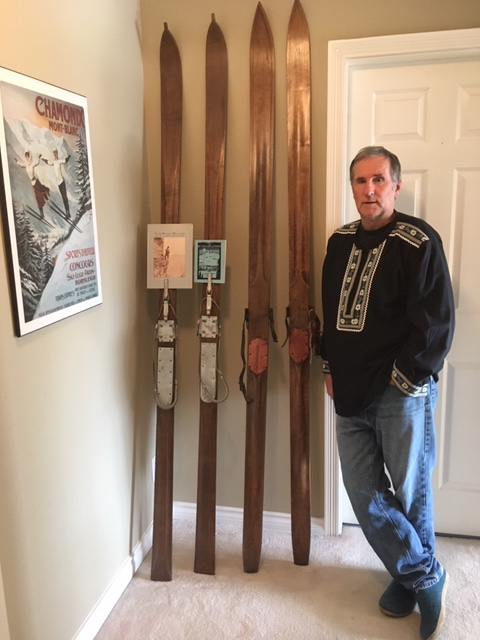
- Dart in 2020
- Born: Ronald Samuel Dart; October 24, 1950 (age 75); Toronto, Ontario
- Occupation: Academic • author
- Known for: Historical writing on the philosophy and careers of Thomas Merton and George Grant; Writings on Red Toryism in Canada
- Spouse: Karin Dart
- Children: Kevin Dart

Academic background
- Education: University of Lethbridge (BA); Regent College (MCS, DCS); University of British Columbia (MA)
- Thesis: The Spirituality of John Cassian
- Academic advisors: James M. Houston; Ian Rennie
- Influences: George Grant; Kenneth Leech; Stephen Leacock; Thomas Merton

Academic work
- School or tradition: Anglo-Catholicism; Presbyterianism; Red Toryism
- Institutions: University of the Fraser Valley
- Main interests: Patristics • history of philosophy • political history

Ronald Samuel Dart, BA (Lethbridge), DCS, MCS (Regent College), MA (UBC), is a university professor and author. In 2022, he was hooded as Doctor of Ministry and Humanities (honoris causa) by St. Stephen's University (New Brunswick).

Dart teaches in the Department of Political Science, Philosophy and Religious Studies at the University of the Fraser Valley in Abbotsford, British Columbia. "He has become the most important writer about the Red Tory tradition in Canada."

He has authored forty books that deal with the interface between literature, spirituality and politics, including Thomas Merton and the Beats of the North Cascades. He is one of the primary experts on the life and thought of both Stephen Leacock and George Grant and their place in the pantheon of traditional Canadian conservative thought.

He is a board member of the Thomas Merton Society of Canada and serves as the Canadian contact for the Evelyn Underhill Association and the Bede Griffiths Sangha. He has also penned numerous articles on Mountaineering.

He contributes regularly to the High Tory alongside the Clarion Journal and The Owl: George Grant Journal, where he became one of the main traditional Tory voices and critic of the "new conservatism" of Stephen Harper and the Conservative Party of Canada.

== Selected works ==
- The North American High Tory Tradition—revised edition (High Tory Publishing, 2024)
- The Scholar-Gipsy: Thrownness, Memoricide and the Great Tradition: Volumes 1-II ( St. Macrina Press, 2024)
- Stephen Leacock: Canada's Red Tory Prophet (Synaxis Press, 2023)
- Scrutinizing Scruton: Canadian High Toryism and Scrutonia (High Tory Publishing, Abbotsford, 2022)
- The Beatitudes: When Mountain Meets Valley (Revised edition) (True North Publishing Company, 2021)
- Roderick Haig-Brown: Canada's Green Prophet (High Tory Press, 2021)
- The Gospel According to Hermes: Intimations of Christianity in Greek Myth, Poetry & Philosophy (St. Macrina Press, 2021)
- Myth and Meaning in Jordan Peterson: A Christian Perspective (Lexham Press, 2020)
- Hermann Hesse: Phoenix Arising (2019)
- Christianity and Pluralism (co-author with J.I. Packer, Lexham Press, 2019)
- Clarion Call of Love: Essays in Gratitude to Archbishop Lazar Puhalo (co-editor: St Macrina Press, 2018)
- George P. Grant: Athena's Aviary, Essays by Ron Dart and Brad Jersak (St Macrina Press, 2018)
- Erasmus: Wild Bird (2017)
- The North American High Tory Tradition (American Anglican Press, 2016)
- C.S. Lewis and Bede Griffiths: Chief Companions (St Macrina Press,2016)
- Thomas Merton and the Counterculture: A Golden String: edited (St Macrina Press, 2016)
- White Gulls & Wild Birds: Essays on C. S. Lewis, Inklings and Friends & Thomas Merton: edited (St Macrina Press, 2015)
- Canadian Christian Zionism: A Tangled Tale (Synaxis Press, 2015).
- Roderick Haig-Brown: Canada’s Green Prophet (Synaxis Press, 2014).
- Being the Church in Abbotsford: Reflective Essays (co-editor - Judson Lake House Publishers, 2013).
- Keepers of the Flame: Canadian Red Toryism (Fermentation press, 2012).
- George P. Grant: Canada's Lone Wolf: Essays in Political Philosophy (Fresh Wind Press, 2011).
- George Grant: Spiders and Bees (Freshwind Press, 2008).
- Thomas Merton and the Beats of the North Cascades, 2nd edition (Serratus Press, 2008).
- Mountaineering and the Humanities (Serratus Press, 2007).
- The Eagle and the Ox: Contemplation, the Church and Politics (Freshwind Press, 2006).
- Christianity and the Symphony of Living Faiths (Synaxis Press, 2006).
- Athens and Jerusalem: George Grant’s Theology, Philosophy, and Politics, co-edited, (University of Toronto Press, 2006).
- Stephen Leacock: Canada’s Red Tory Prophet (Synaxis Press, 2006).
- The Beatitudes: When Mountain Meets Valley (Freshwind Press, 2005).
- The Spirituality of John Cassian (Synaxis Press, 2005).
- Erasmus and Merton: Soul Friends (Chelsea Press, 2005).
- Thomas Merton and the Beats of the North Cascades, 1st edition (Serratus Press, 2005).
- The Canadian High Tory Tradition: Raids on the Unspeakable (Synaxis Press, 2004).
- Busking (Synaxis Press, 2003).
- Robin Mathews: Crown Prince of Canadian Political Poets (Synaxis Press, 2002).
- St. Matthew’s Parish: A People’s History (2001).
- Crosshairs: Being Poetic, Being Political, Being Canadian (Synaxis Press, 2000).
- The Red Tory Tradition: Ancient Routes, New Routes (Synaxis Press, 1999).
- In A Pluralist Age (Regent College Publishing, 1998).
- The Marks of the Church and Renewal (Chelsea Press, 1994).
- Lizard in the Palace (Chelsea Press, 1992).
- The Lute and the Anvil (Chelsea Press, 1988).
- Contemplation and the Polis (Chelsea Press, 1987).
- Adam: Romantics, Rationalists, Prophets: A Dialogue (Chelsea Press, 1985).
