= Deep integration =

Deep integration, as defined by Simone Claar and Andrea Nölke, means trade agreements which not only contain rules on tariffs and conventional non-tariff trade restrictions, but which also regulate the business environment in a more general sense. Issues of deep integration include competition policy, investor rights, product standards, public procurement and intellectual property rights, for example.

== Canada and United States ==
Deep integration can also specifically refer to the harmonization of policies and regulations of Canada and the United States.

== Chile, Colombia, Mexico and Peru ==
In 2011, Chile, Colombia, Mexico and Peru initiated steps to create a Deep Integration bloc.

It is called "The Pacific Alliance".

== See also ==
- Security and Prosperity Partnership of North America
- Trade, Investment and Labour Mobility Agreement
