= Immigration Watch Canada =

Immigration Watch Canada (IWC) is a Vancouver-based anti-immigration non-profit organization and website founded by Dan B. Murray, a former teacher. IWC lobbies for limiting immigration to 25,000 annually.

The group would not receive media coverage until 2014, when a small number of anti-immigration flyers and posters bearing IWC's name and website address were distributed to selected areas in Brampton and Toronto, Ontario. Further single-day incidents of limited distributions occurred in Richmond, British Columbia, in 2016 and in Charlottetown, Prince Edward Island, in August, 2018. The message of the posters was denounced by the media. Murray distanced himself from some of the incidents, claiming that the IWC had not authorized certain posters that were "vulgar." In November 2014, six IWC members in Richmond held an anti-immigration protest blaming immigrants for traffic congestion and an unsustainable increase in the cost of housing in B.C.'s Lower Mainland.

== Background ==
According to its founder, Dan Murray, in a 2015 YouTube video, Immigration Watch Canada was originally just a small group of environmentally-minded people concerned that the Lower Mainland of British Columbia was being overwhelmed by newcomers by the mid-1990s. They met in each other's homes or at the Burnaby Public Library. When they realized that 83% of the new arrivals were immigrants, they changed the name of their group from the Lower Mainland Sustainable Population Group to Immigration Watch Canada.

Murray blamed the increase on immigration policies introduced by Barbara McDougall in 1990 to get more votes for the Conservative Party. He claimed that Liberals, NDPs, and Conservatives all support immigration to get votes.

== Protests ==
Early in the morning of 19 November 2014, five IWC members—including founder Dan Murray and fellow spokesperson Bradley Salzberg—hung a large banner on Highway 99 Blundell Road overpass in Richmond, BC, blaming Canada's immigration policy for the Lower Mainland's traffic congestion problems and for the increased price of housing in Richmond. The RCMP asked protesters to "ensure they did not drop anything from the overpass onto the roadway below."

== Controversies ==
=== Putting Canada First ===
Both Dan Murray and Bradley Saltzberg are co-founders of Putting Canada First (PCF), "a registered not-for-profit organization dedicated to the preservation and advancement of Anglo-Canadian heritage within Canadian society," incorporated in March 2014, that challenges "Canadian multiculturalism and large-scale immigration."

In his response to an article that was critical of PCF, the PCF Board wrote that the organization "would never support or tolerate racist or hateful policy and action." However, on 18 September 2014, then-PCF director Bradley Saltzberg was outed "for PCF's use of fake identities" on social media and in his "lengthy emails" to "dozens of journalists, politicians and candidates" in the Vancouver area to "propel an anti-Asian agenda." The fake IDs specifically targeted Meena Wong, who was then running for Mayor of Vancouver. As a result, Saltzberg, "one of the most vocal critics of Asian immigration in Canada," was fired by PCF. By October 2014, a "web of fake identities, bogus social media accounts and misleading email addresses" behind IWC and PCF promoting an anti-immigration agenda, was uncovered.

=== Flyers and posters ===
IWC has received much criticism for its distribution and display of anti-immigration flyers and posters. The President of the World Sikh Organization of Canada called the IWC's anti-immigration material, which appeared in 2014 and 2016, a "pathetic attempt at drawing the spotlight to deplorable views that have been rejected in Canada." He highlighted that "Sikhs are an integral part of the Canadian fabric and we are proud that many turbaned Sikhs serve Canada in the federal cabinet, Armed Forces and many other capacities." Mentioning that the 2014 "anti-immigration flyers singling out the Sikh community in Brampton" were distributed by "the same group" who "hung an anti-immigration banner from a Richmond overpass," Nick Eagland described IWC in the Vancouver Sun as "promot[ing] white nationalism in its materials and on its website."

==== 2014 ====
In April 2014, IWC distributed a flyer targeting the Sikh community in Brampton, Ontario, depicting a black-and-white photo of an all-white group with the caption "From this," above a colour photo of a group of angry Sikh protesters, with the caption "To this." The flyer was denounced by Ontario Premier Kathleen Wynne and Ontario NDP Leader Andrea Horwath. A representative of the World Sikh Organization of Canada (WSO) said that while the flyer was "quite upsetting," it was not a hate crime, and he did not "expect anything to be done." Another round of anti-Sikh flyers bearing the IWC name were distributed in Brampton on 7 August 2014, though IWC denied its involvement. The flyers were denounced by Ontario's Citizenship and Immigration minister Michael Chan, and the distribution of the "hateful material" was condemned officially by a unanimously-adopted motion in the Legislative Assembly of Ontario. The House re-affirmed "the positive values of tolerance and inclusion that are the hallmarks of modern Ontario society."

Less than a week after the Brampton flyers were distributed, anti-immigration flyers bearing IWC's name appeared in the Greater Toronto Area in two separate occurrences. The second batch that circulated was around the Keele Street campus of York University, with some being placed in mailboxes of the university's Village area of residences. The posters were removed by York, and the university also posted to the "YorkU Memes" Facebook group that the York logo was used without the university's permission. While, in an email, IWC founder and spokesperson Dan Murray clarified that IWC did authorize the "distribution of two flyers at York University," they did not authorize the flyer [with the York logo]."

==== 2016 ====
On 19 September 2016, a dozen anti-Sikh posters, which included the link to the IWC webpage, were found on the University of Alberta campus in Edmonton. While the posters were torn down, including one that was "taped to the door of the Rutherford Library," a digital image went viral. That month, an IWC spokesman stated that the posters were not theirs, adding that they only use fact-based arguments on immigration issues and do not use "vulgar posters." University President David H. Turpin, who noted the instances of similar posters on other Canadian university campuses in Canada, announced the investigation by the University of Alberta Protective Services, stating that the University "is a space that is open to all people and we take pride in the strength of our diverse community." A representative of the campus' Indian Students' Association, which represents over 2,500 East-Indian students, said it was unfortunate that this happened in the first weeks of the semester when new international students are just arriving.

On 28 November 2016, IWC anti-immigration flyers were distributed in Richmond, British Columbia, which bore the headline "Immigration Has Turned Into the Plundering of Canada," and referred to IWC's online reports that blame the housing crisis in Metro Vancouver, with its "grossly inflated house prices," on Chinese buyers. Dan Murray confirmed that his group was responsible for the flyers, and said that the issues raised by the flyers were "extremely important." In addition to the RCMP's General Investigation Section (GIS) consulting with the B.C. Hate Crime Team on the matter, B.C. Premier Christy Clark and other political and community leaders "swiftly condemned" the flyers. In a 2017 in-depth article on anti-Chinese racism in Canada relating to the topic of Canada's 150th anniversary, Vancouver-based Ng Weng Hoong mentioned the distribution of the flyers in Richmond as being done by the "shadowy Immigration Watch Canada" to describe the "thousands of wealthy Chinese" arriving in Canada as plunderers.

==== 2018 ====
In July 2018, the IWC distributed a single-page flysheet through Canada Post in Charlottetown, Prince Edward Island. The sheet criticized government immigration policies, claimed that "Canada's founding majority population" will be replaced, and that "diversity" was a "disaster." Writing for The Guardian, Alan Holman observed that, if "by that, the flysheet means people of British decent [sic], then that train has already left the station."
