= Will Kymlicka =

Canadian philosopher (born 1962)

Will Kymlicka OC FRSC
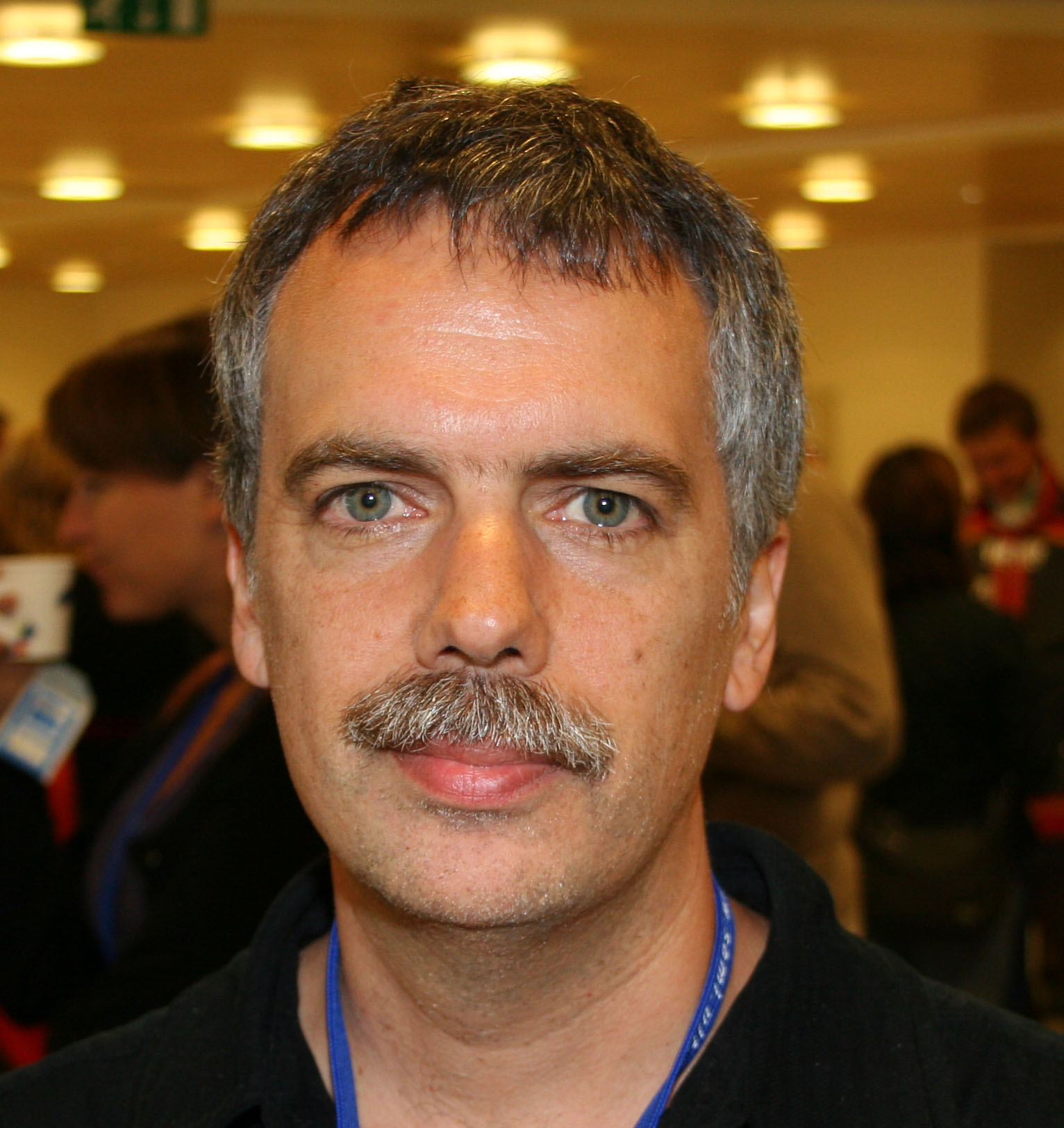
- Kymlicka in 2008
- Born: William Kymlicka; 1962 (age 63–64); London, Ontario, Canada
- Spouse: Sue Donaldson
- Awards: Officer of the Order of Canada (2023); Killam Prize (2004); Pierre Chauveau Medal (2001)

Education
- Education: Queen's University (BA); University of Oxford (DPhil)
- Thesis: Liberal equality and cultural community (1987)
- Doctoral advisor: G. A. Cohen

Philosophical work
- Era: Contemporary philosophy
- Region: Western philosophy
- School: Modern liberalism
- Institutions: Queen's University; Central European University
- Doctoral students: Omid Payrow Shabani
- Main interests: Animal ethics; animal rights; citizenship; minority rights; multiculturalism; political philosophy
- Notable works: Zoopolis: A Political Theory of Animal Rights (co-authored with Sue Donaldson, 2013)
- Notable ideas: Multicultural citizenship; political theory of animal rights; societal culture as a shared institutional framework

William Kymlicka (/ˈkɪmlɪkə/ KIM-lih-kə; born 1962) is a Canadian political philosopher best known for his work on multiculturalism and animal ethics. He is currently Professor of Philosophy and Canada Research Chair in Political Philosophy at Queen's University at Kingston, and Recurrent Visiting professor in the Nationalism Studies program at the Central European University in Budapest, Hungary. For over 20 years, he has lived a vegan lifestyle, and he is married to the Canadian author and animal rights activist Sue Donaldson.

== Education and career ==
Kymlicka received his B.A. (Honours) in philosophy and political studies from Queen's University in 1984, and his D.Phil. in philosophy from Oxford University in 1987, under the direction of G. A. Cohen. He has written extensively on multiculturalism and political philosophy, and several of his books have been translated into other languages. Kymlicka has held professorships at a variety of different universities in Canada and abroad, and has also worked as an advisor to the Government of Canada.

== Thought ==
One of his main concerns throughout his work is providing a liberal framework for the just treatment of minority groups, which he divides into two basic categories: polyethnic or immigrant groups, and national minorities (such as the Canadian Québécois, or the Māori of New Zealand). He lists criteria for national minorities or "minority nations":

- present at founding;
- prior history of self-government;
- common culture;
- common language;
- governing selves through institutions.

By these criteria, the two "minority nations" in Canada are the Indigenous peoples in Canada and the Québécois. Kymlicka argues that such minority groups deserve unique rights from the state by the nature of their unique role and history within the national population.

Polyethnic groups are less deserving of such rights since they come to the state voluntarily and thus have some degree of responsibility to integrate to the norms of their new nation. This does not mean that they are not entitled to any rights as Kymlicka argues that all cultural minorities have a right to choose their own lives, but it does mean that they are not entitled to the same level of group rights which minority nations would be entitled to. Kymlicka makes various exceptions such as the problems faced by refugees, whether from conflict or poverty, and by such minority groups such as African-Americans (whose heritage in America clearly did not begin voluntarily) and argues that their needs with regards to cultural group-specific rights should be considered on a special basis.

In Multicultural Citizenship (1995), Kymlicka argues that group-specific rights are consistent with liberalism, and are particularly appropriate, if not outright demanded, in certain situations. He defines three such group-specific rights: special group representation rights (such as affirmative action policies in politics); self-government rights; and polyethnic rights (such as the policy exempting Sikhs from having to wear motorcycle helmets).

A distinction that Kymlicka draws, which is crucial to his liberal defence of group-specific rights for minorities, is between external protection and internal restrictions. Kymlicka argues that external protections between groups may be justified in order to promote equality (but they must not allow for oppression or exploitation, as in apartheid in South Africa). Internal restrictions, however, cannot be justified from a liberal perspective, insofar as they restrict a person's autonomy, though they may be granted in certain cases to national minorities.

Brian Barry argues that Kymlicka's views are not liberal at all, in the sense that they are not universalist in nature and that they allow for cultural relativism. Barry further accuses Kymlicka of posing a false choice between liberalism as autonomy and liberalism as tolerance, further asserting that claims for cultural rights and for equality of treatment are incompatible. Young Kim provides an interesting comparison of their two views on multiculturalism and the limits of liberalism.

=== Human rights ===
For Kymlicka, the standard liberal criticism, which states that group rights are problematic because they often treat individuals as mere carriers of group identities, rather than autonomous social agents, is overstated or oversimplified. The actual problem of minorities and how they should be viewed in liberal democracies is much more complex. There is a distinction between good group rights, bad group rights, and intolerable group rights.

- Bad group rights (internal restrictions) are rules imposed by the group upon intragroup relations. They most often take the form of the group restricting the liberty of individual members in the name of group solidarity. Indigenous groups try to protect themselves from women's movements on the basis that they threaten the social and traditional role of indigenous populations. He contends that may raise the danger of individual oppression. Internal restrictions can be used to uphold violent, dominant, absolutist systems. Legally-imposed internal restrictions are thus bad and almost always unjust, not to mention that they go against liberal ideals.
- Good group rights (external protections) involve intergroup relations. Indigenous groups need protection in terms of their nationals identities by limiting the vulnerability of that group to the decisions of external groups or society. Therefore, they should have the right to their own taxation, health care, education, and governance.

=== Animal rights ===
The book Zoopolis, by Sue Donaldson and co-authored with Kymlicka, explores the state of animal rights for different categories of animals.

Donaldson and Kymlicka believe that abolitionism is an inadequate response to both the ethical and practical challenges of living fairly and constructively with other animals.

Donaldson and Kymlicka suggest that animals should be characterized through three categories, serving to determine the nature of the laws and politics that should protect those animals. Domesticated animals should be given a kind of adjusted co-citizenship in which their best interest and preferences would be taken into account. Donaldson and Kymlicka defend the end of their use, advocating for a vegan position, but they reject extinctionism with regards to those animals that are currently bred by humans. Wild animals should be granted sovereignty on their land enough so that they can sustain their way of living and prosper. Donaldson and Kymlicka support some moderate forms of intervention to reduce wild animal suffering, and they claim that more significant courses of action should be aiming at keeping wild animals able to lead their lives. "Liminal" animals, those that are not domesticated but live in urban, suburban, or industrial areas (such as mice, pigeons and insects), should be treated as denizens of human communities.

In 2025, Kymlicka published, together with Sue Donaldson, the book Animals and the Right to Politics, in which they critique the prevailing “minimal animal” paradigm found in traditional animal theories and argue in favor of an approach that seeks to recognize and support the political agency of animals as minded social beings.

== Awards and honours ==
- In 2004, Kymlicka was awarded the Killam Prize by the Canada Council for the Arts
- Multicultural Citizenship was awarded the Macpherson Prize by the Canadian Political Science Association, and the Ralph Bunche Award by the American Political Science Association
- He is a Fellow of the Royal Society of Canada, and of the Canadian Institute for Advanced Research
- From 2004 to 2006, he was the President of the American Society for Political and Legal Philosophy
- In 2014 Kymlicka was awarded an honorary doctorate from the Philosophy Institute of the University of Leuven.
- In 2021, Kymlicka received the Pierre Chauveau Medal.
- He was named an Officer of the Order of Canada in 2023.

== Selected publications ==
- Zoopolis: A Political Theory of Animal Rights (Oxford: Oxford University Press, 2011). ISBN 0-19-959966-1
- "Immigration, Multiculturalism, and the Welfare State" (Ethics & International Affairs, Volume 20.3, Fall 2006)
- Politics in the Vernacular: Nationalism, Multiculturalism, Citizenship (Oxford: Oxford University Press, 2001). ISBN 0-19-924098-1
- Finding Our Way: Rethinking Ethnocultural Relations in Canada (Oxford: Oxford University Press, 1998). ISBN 0-19-541314-8
- Multicultural Citizenship: A Liberal Theory of Minority Rights (Oxford: Oxford University Press, 1995). ISBN 0-19-829091-8
- Contemporary Political Philosophy: An Introduction (Oxford: Oxford University Press, 1990–2001). ISBN 0-19-878274-8
- Liberalism, Community, and Culture (Oxford: Oxford University Press, 1989–1991). ISBN 0-19-827871-3

== Interviews ==
- Kymlicka, Will (8 June 2008). Will Kymlicka on Minority Rights (with transcript) (mp3). Philosophy Bites (podcast). Episode #61. Interviewed by Warburton, Nigel.

== See also ==
- Contributions to liberal theory
- List of vegans
