= Christopher Looby =

American literary critic

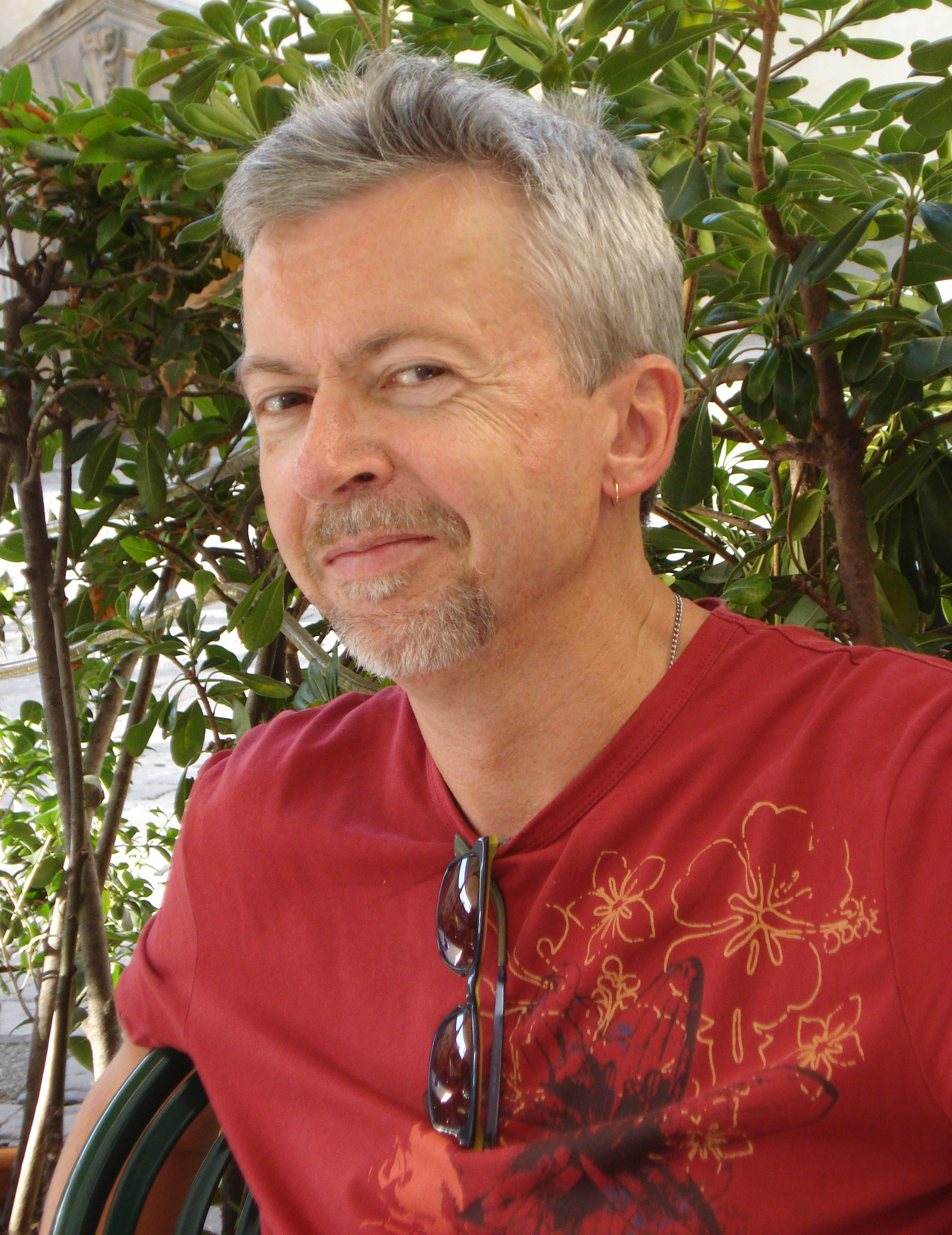
- Christopher Looby
- Occupation: Professor

Christopher Looby is an American literary critic specializing in 18th and 19th century American literature. He is a Professor of English at UCLA.

== Background ==
Looby received his B.A. from Washington University in St. Louis in 1979 and his Ph.D. from Columbia University in 1989.

== Select publications ==
- "Introduction." Sheppard Lee: Written By Himself by Robert Montgomery Bird. New York: New York Review of Books, 2008. xv-xliii.
- The Complete Civil War Journal and Selected Letters of Thomas Wentworth Higginson. Chicago: Univ. of Chicago Press, 2000.
- Voicing America: Language, Literary Form, and the Origins of the United States. Chicago: Univ. of Chicago Press, 1996.
