= Balachandra Rajan =

Indian diplomat, writer and literary critic

Balachandra Rajan (24 March 1920 – 23 January 2009) was an Indian diplomat and a scholar of poetry and poetics.

== Life and career ==
Focusing particularly on the poetry of John Milton, Rajan was Professor Emeritus of English at the University of Western Ontario and Rajan was Fellow of Trinity College, Cambridge from 1944 to 1948, but left England to return to his native India, where he served in the Indian Foreign Service until 1961. During that period he served on the Indian Delegation to the United Nations, working extensively with UNESCO and UNICEF, and chairing an international anti-malaria effort. He served as Chairman of the UNICEF Executive Board from 1955 to 1956. Leaving his diplomatic career to return to academe, Rajan taught at the University of Delhi before emigrating to Canada to take up a position at the University of Western Ontario.

Rajan's scholarly work covered a wide range of English poetry, but returned frequently to Milton and particularly to Milton's Paradise Lost. His work cannot be easily assigned to any critical methodology; he was a scholar of poetics in many forms and from many approaches. His 1947 book Paradise Lost and the Seventeenth Century Reader is primarily a response to Milton's apparent interest in Arianism, considered a heresy, and argues for a distinction between private and public meaning in Milton's poetry. The book was influential for William Empson, particularly Empson's critique of strictly theological readings of Paradise Lost, Milton's God. Later essays explore what Rajan calls "generic multeity" in Paradise Lost.

In addition to his work on Milton, Rajan's later criticism addresses issues of meaning, intention, and context in a broad array of writers including Spenser, Yeats, Marvell, Keats, and Macaulay. Rajan considered 'poetry cannot report the event, it must be the event.'

Rajan also wrote two novels. The Dark Dancer is a sobering study of the conflicts of the Partition; Too Long in the West, on the other hand, is a more light-hearted satire (perhaps influenced by Tagore's Farewell, My Friend) about a girl's return to her home village after an emancipating education in New York.

Rajan's daughter is the scholar and literary theorist Tilottama Rajan, who also teaches at Western.

== Critical Works ==
- Paradise Lost and the Seventeenth Century Reader. London: Chatto and Windus, 1947. Reprinted Ann Arbor: University of Michigan Press, 1967.
- W.B.Yeats: A Critical Introduction. London: Hutchinson University Library, 1965.
- The Lofty Rhyme: A Study of Milton's Major Poetry. London: Routledge, 1970.
- The Overwhelming Question: A Study of the Poetry of T.S. Eliot. Toronto: University of Toronto Press, 1976.
- The Form of the Unfinished: English Poetics from Spenser to Pound. Princeton: Princeton University Press, 1985.
- Under Western Eyes: India from Milton to Macaulay. Durham: Duke University Press, 1999.
- Milton and the Climate of Reading: Essays. Toronto: University of Toronto Press, 2006.

== Fiction ==
- The Dark Dancer. New York: Simon and Schuster, 1958.
- Too Long in the West. New York: Atheneum, 1962.
