= Tilottama Rajan =

Canadian scholar

- Born: 1951 (age 74–75)
- Awards: Distinguished Lifetime Award (Keats-Shelley Association of America), A.S.P. Woodhouse Prize, Guggenheim Fellowship

Education
- Education: University of Toronto (BA, MA, PhD)

Philosophical work
- Era: 21st-century philosophy
- Region: Western philosophy
- School: Continental
- Institutions: University of Western Ontario
- Main interests: post-Kantian philosophy, Romantic literature
- Website: publish.uwo.ca/~trajan/

Tilottama Rajan (born 1951) is a Canadian scholar and Distinguished University Professor at the University of Western Ontario. She is Canada Research Chair and a Fellow of the Royal Society of Canada. Rajan is known for her research on Romantic literature, post-Kantian philosophy and contemporary theory. She is the daughter of Balachandra Rajan.

== Books ==
- Dark Interpreter: The Discourse of Romanticism, Cornell University Press, 1980
- The Supplement of Reading: Figures of Understanding in Romantic Theory and Practice, Cornell University Press, 1990
- Deconstruction and the Remainders of Phenomenology: Sartre, Derrida, Foucault, Baudrillard, Stanford University Press, 2002
- Romantic Narrative: Shelley, Hays, Godwin, Wollstonecraft, Johns Hopkins University Press, 2010
