= MAGA movement =

American right-wing populist political movement

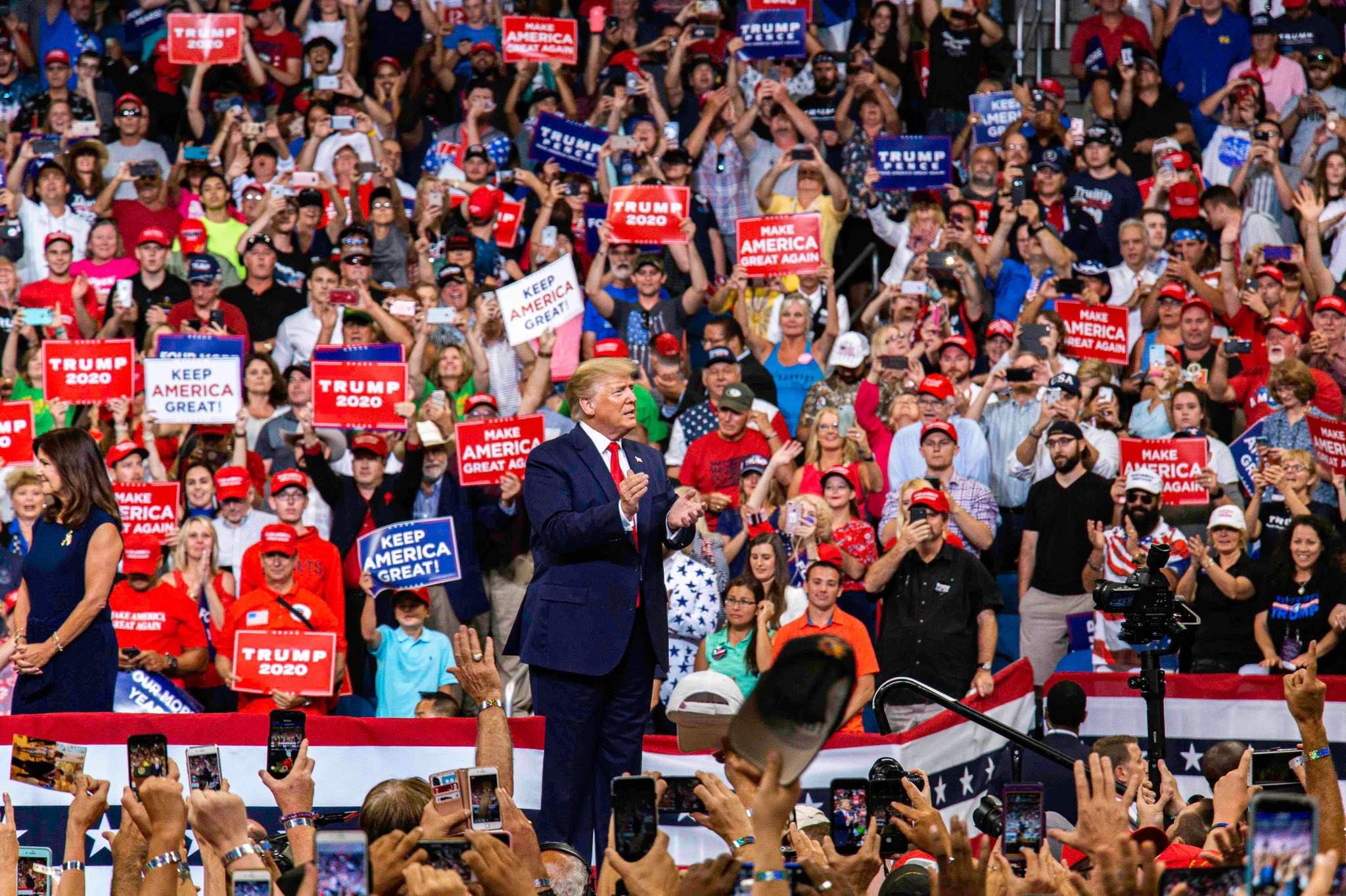
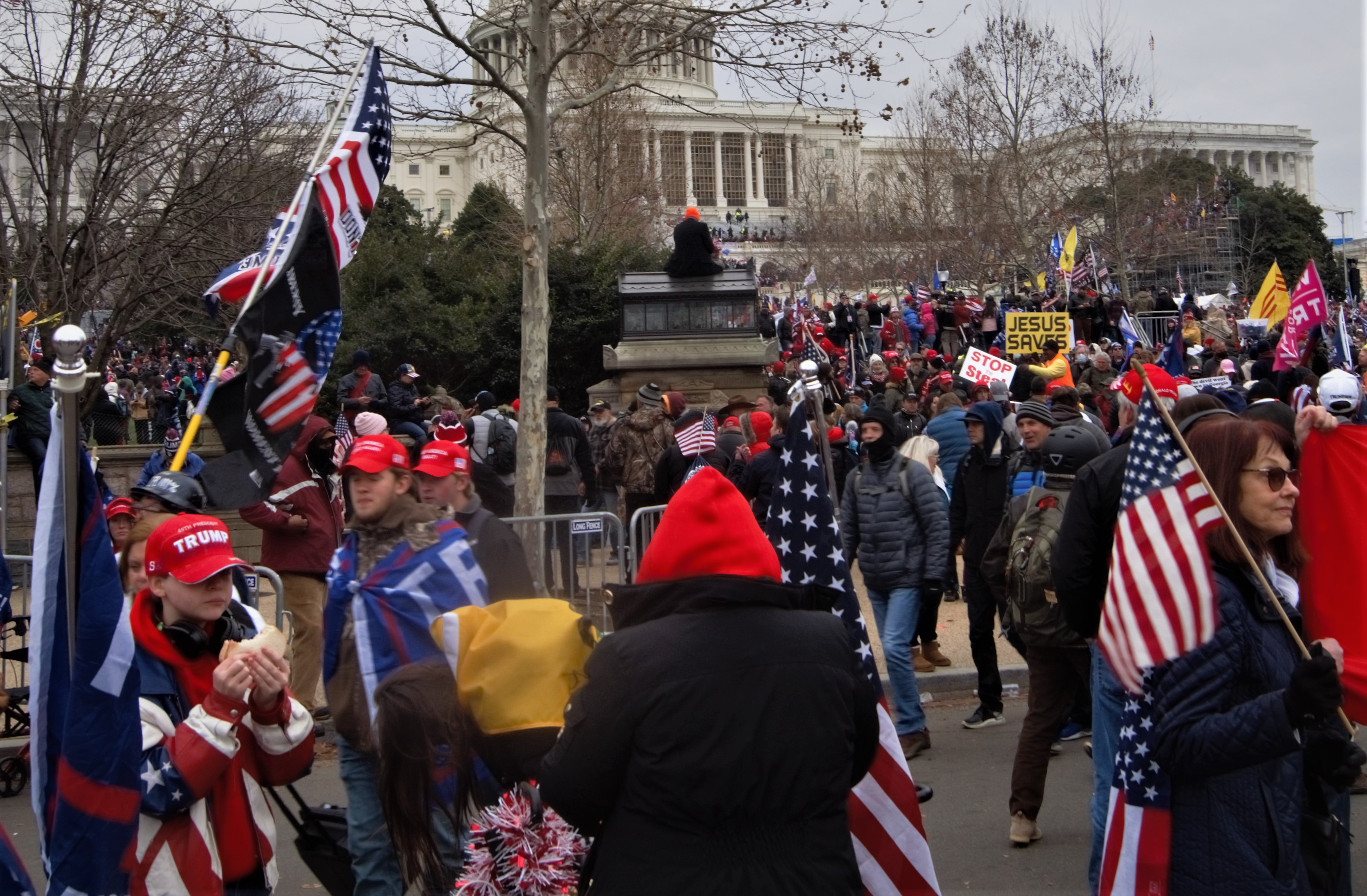
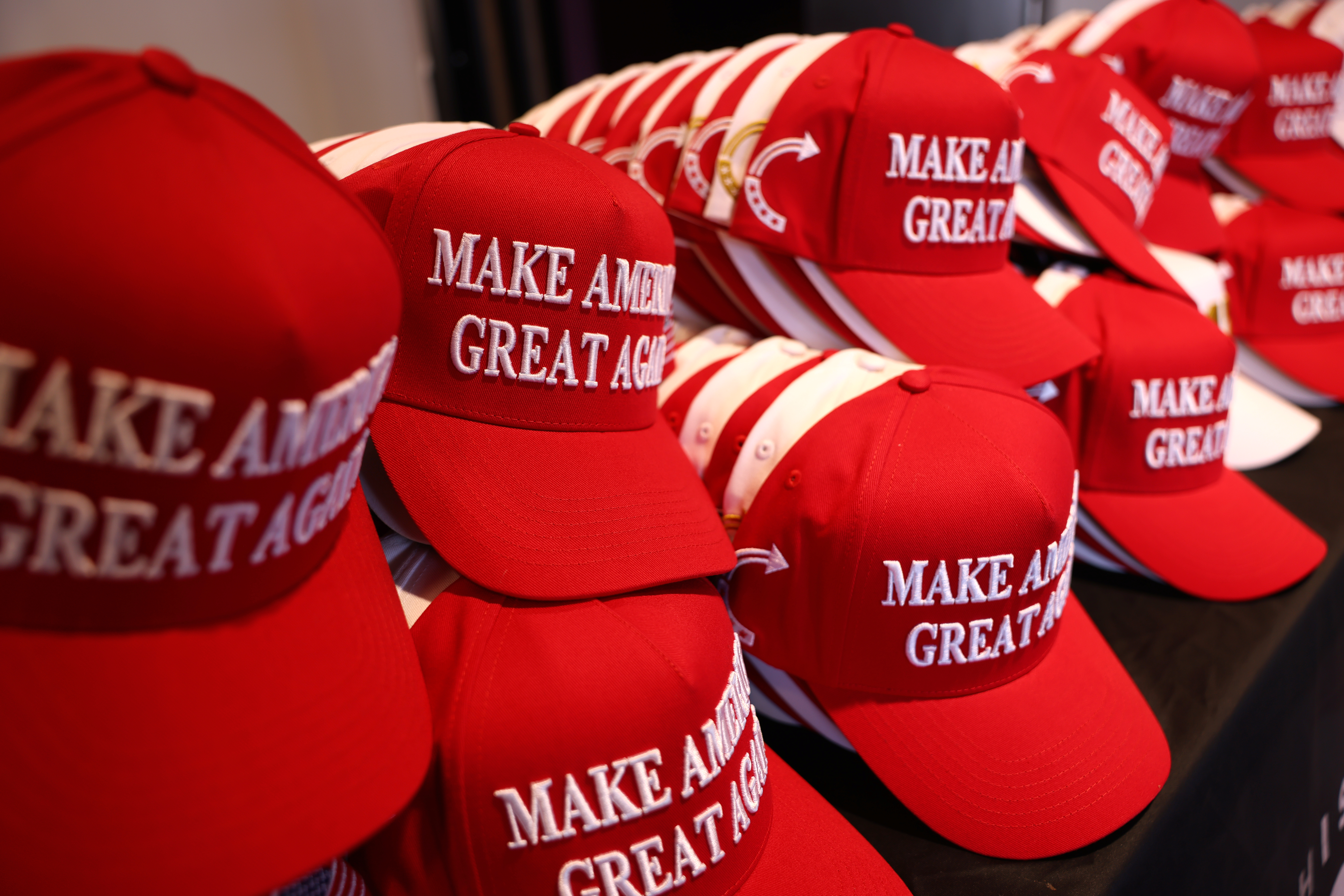
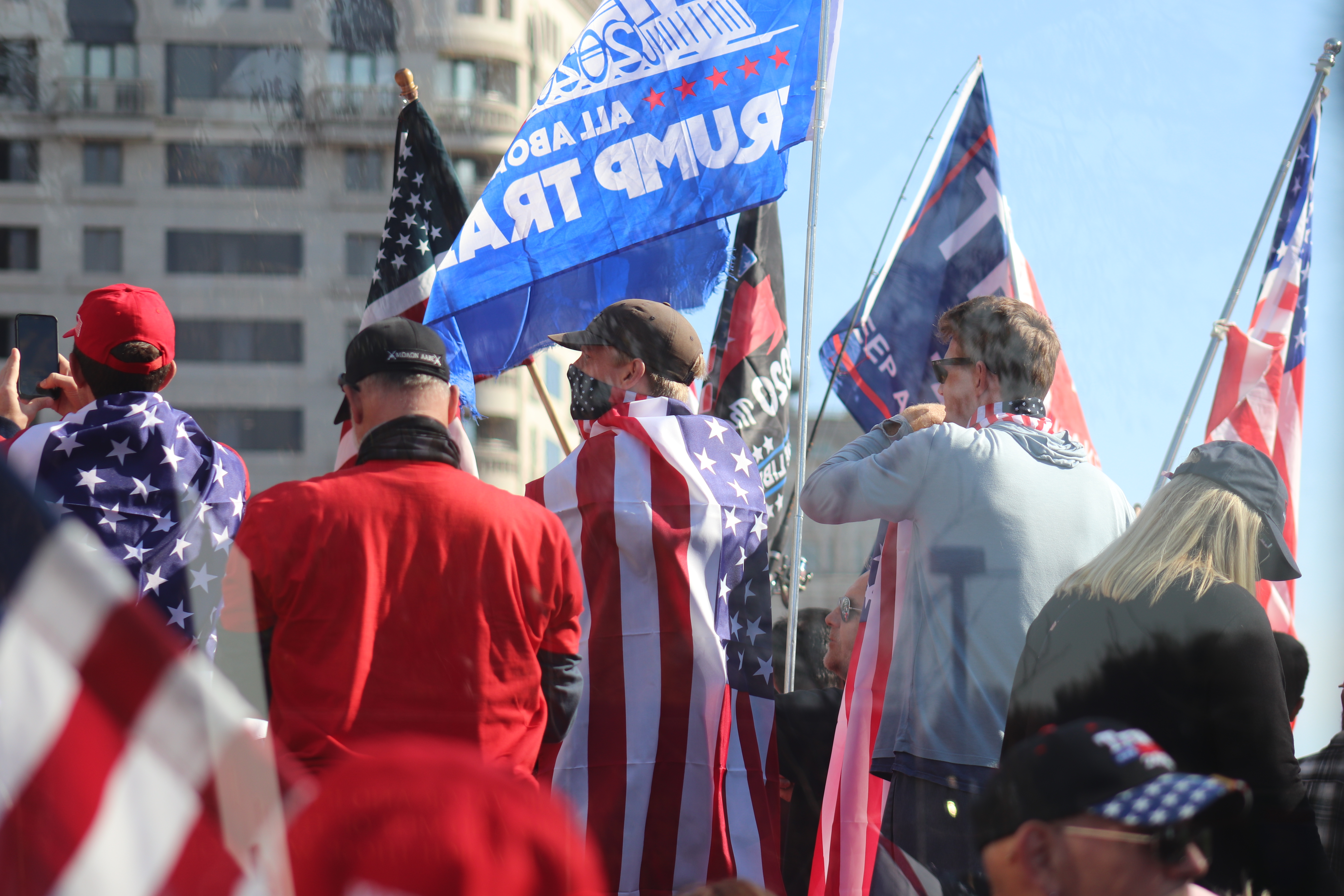
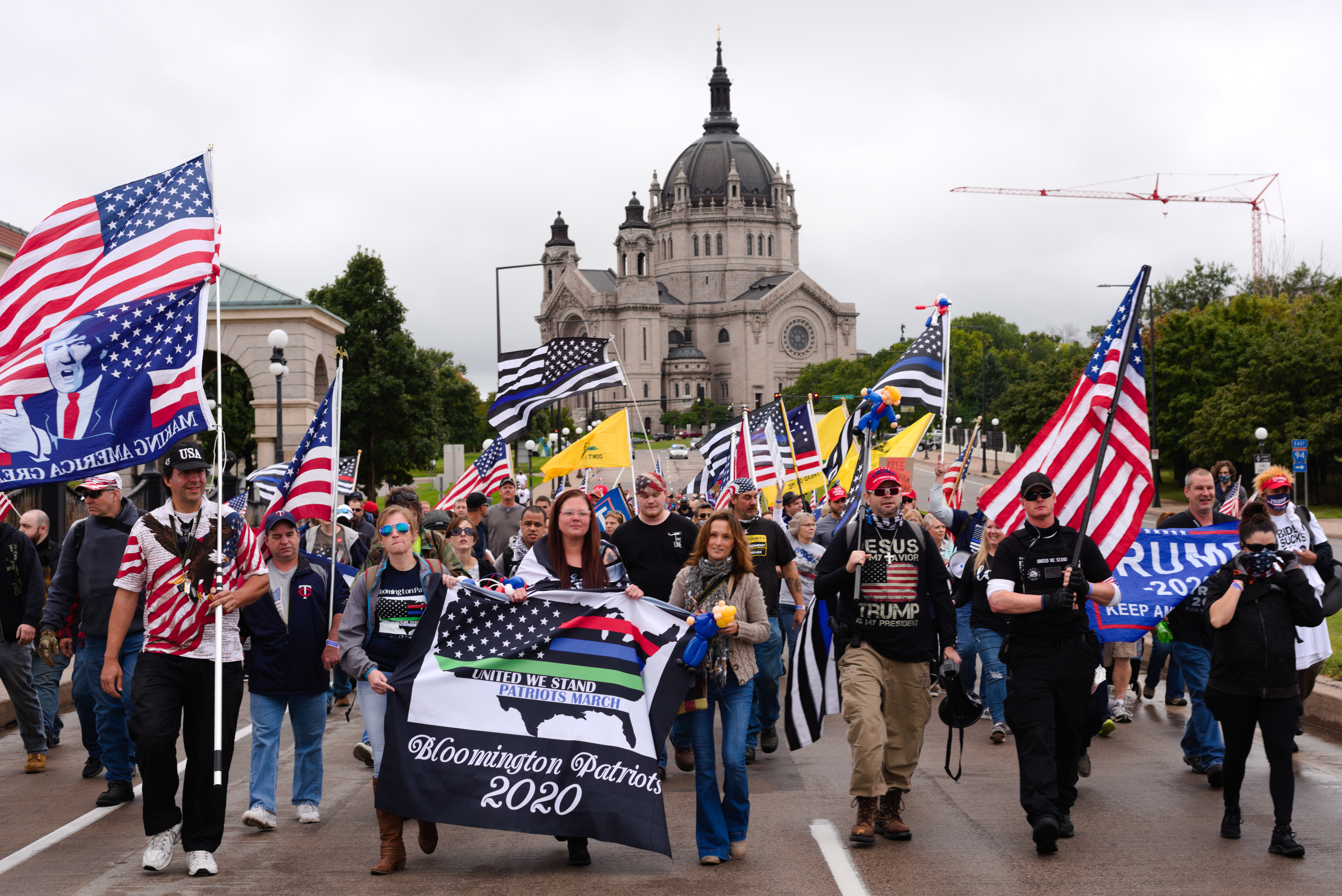
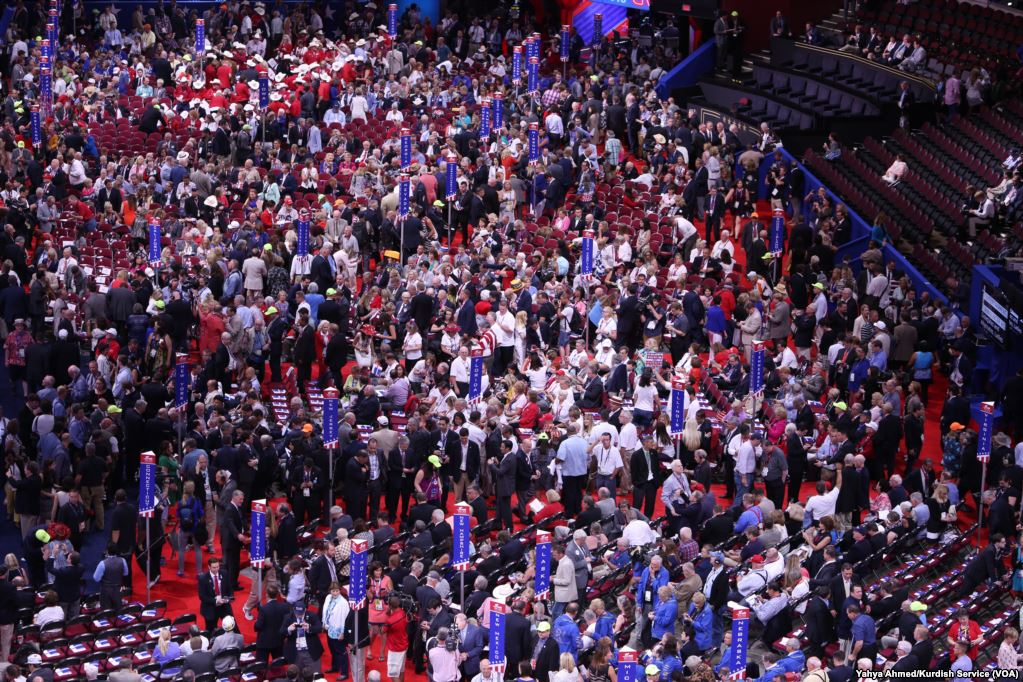
- From top to bottom, left to right: A Trump rally in 2019; The January 6 Capitol attack; A collection of MAGA hats; The Million MAGA March; An assembly of Trump supporters in Minnesota; The 2016 Republican National Convention
- Leader: Donald Trump
- Founded: June 16, 2015; 11 years ago
- Ideology: Trumpism
- Political position: Right-wing to far-right
- National affiliation: Republican Party
- Slogan: Make America Great Again

The Make America Great Again (MAGA) movement is an American right-wing political movement that began with Donald Trump's announcement initiating a campaign in the 2016 United States presidential election. The movement is closely aligned with Trumpism, a set of ideologies and beliefs surrounding Trump.

The movement reshaped the country's identity, particularly within the Republican Party. In a poll conducted by YouGov in March 2026, sixty percent of Republicans identified themselves as MAGA, indicating broad support for the movement within the Republican Party.

== History ==
=== 2015–2016: Establishment and Trump's initial victory ===
In June 2015, businessman and television personality Donald Trump announced that he was running for president in the 2016 United States presidential election. His campaign employed the term "make America great again", a political slogan previously used as a catchphrase by Ronald Reagan during his 1980 presidential campaign and mentioned by President Bill Clinton several times in his presidential campaigns and presidency. Trump used the phrase in his announcement speech to criticize other presidential candidates as "controlled fully by the lobbyists". The phrase was also used on Trump's campaign website and by Texas senator Ted Cruz in praising Trump for announcing his presidential campaign.

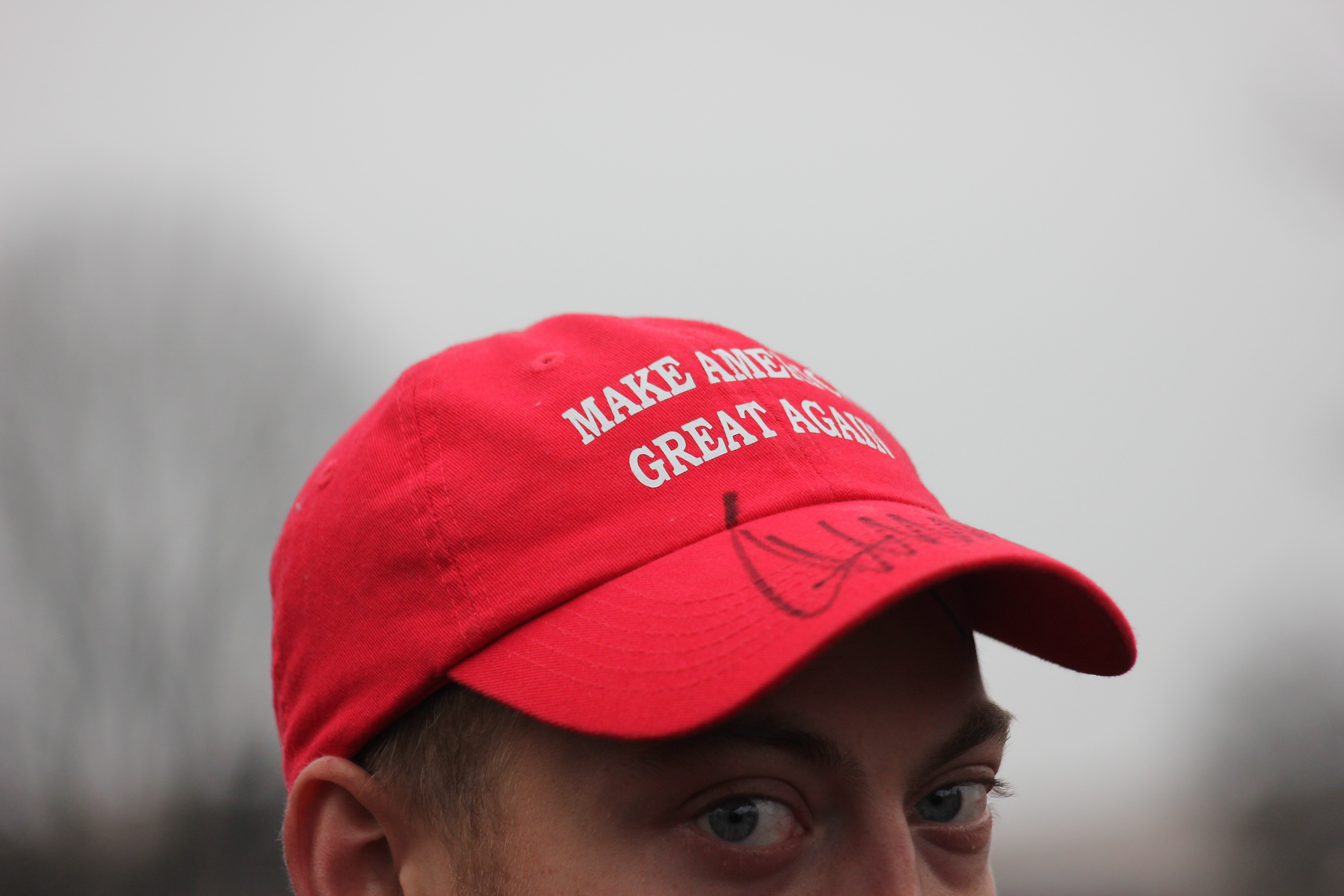
The MAGA hat is a symbol for the MAGA movement.

In an interview with The Washington Post, Trump stated that he conceived the phrase after the 2012 presidential election and filed a trademark application for it five days later. The trademark became effective one month after he announced his presidential campaign. Merchandise bearing the phrase "Make America Great Again" was sold at Trump Tower. The phrase also appeared on baseball caps worn by Trump as early as July 2015 during a visit to Laredo, Texas. It was additionally used as name of two political action committees supporting Trump's campaign.

=== 2017–2021: Trump's first presidency ===
As the COVID-19 pandemic in the United States worsened in March 2020, disagreements emerged withing the MAGA movement regarding the severity of the disease and the federal government's response. Some Trump supporters remained steadfast in seeking to contain COVID-19 to ensure Trump's victory in the 2020 presidential election. The threat of COVID-19 was made apparent to followers of the MAGA movement after warnings from Trump's health officials; nonetheless, several Trump supporters articulated that Trump's response could be extreme. Anthony Fauci, the director of the National Institute of Allergy and Infectious Diseases, received criticism from a minority of far-right Trump supporters for his apparent political beliefs. As protests began across the United States in the aftermath of the murder of George Floyd, followers of the MAGA movement vociferously opposed the political slogan "defund the police". Several members approached demonstrations with counterprotests, a development that resulted in the killings of Aaron Danielson and Michael Reinoehl, a Trump supporter and his alleged killer, respectively, and the Kenosha unrest shooting, in which Kyle Rittenhouse shot three men, killing two.

As the 2020 presidential election results were broadcast, Trump publicly criticized Fox News for being the first news network to declare that Joe Biden had won the election in Arizona. His comments resulted in some members of the MAGA movement shifting towards news networks such as One America News Network and Newsmax, both of which promoted claims of electoral fraud that were later found to be false, and toward social networks such as Parler.. Newsmax received criticism itself from QAnon supporters, who denounced the network's use of a photograph of a man wearing a hoodie to illustrate white nationalism, and Parler faced false allegations that it was owned by the investor and philanthropist George Soros, the subject of conspiracy theories from Trump's supporters.

=== 2021–2025: Between presidencies ===
The MAGA movement remained a significant topic of public discourse between Trump's first and second term. In a 2022 speech, Joe Biden stated that Donald Trump and what he described as "MAGA Republicans" posed a threat to American Democracy.

=== 2025–present: Trump's second presidency ===
During Trump's second term, the ideology of the MAGA movement appeared to take a shift from non-interventionism to interventionism via increased commentary on the politics of foreign nations, military attacks on countries such as Venezuela and Iran, and expansionist ambitions in the arctic.

The MAGA Mall, a major retailer of MAGA merchandise, reported a sharp decline between 2024 and 2026 in sales.

== Activities ==
=== Foreign involvement and recognition ===
Ahead of the 2019 Canadian federal election, Twitter accounts identifying with the MAGA movement campaigned against the Liberal Party of Canada and its leader, Justin Trudeau. Following protests against the Mexican president Claudia Sheinbaum in 2025 regarding the assassination of Carlos Manso, the protesters received support from members of the MAGA movement.

After the 2024 Romanian presidential election was annulled following allegations of Russian interference, the subsequent 2025 Romanian presidential election attracted interest from several figures associated with the MAGA movement. The controversy surrounding Călin Georgescu's disqualification was promoted to prominent MAGA figures by Adrian Thiess, a Romanian political consultant.

The MAGA movement has attracted an international audience, including among some traditionalist conservatives in the United Kingdom. Following their premierships, British prime ministers Boris Johnson and Liz Truss appeared at several events associated with the MAGA movement. Ahead of 2025 United Kingdom local elections in, Nigel Farage hosted political events that commentators compared to MAGA rallies.

Amid concerns that the Alternative for Germany could face a ban after the Federal Office for the Protection of the Constitution classified the party as right-wing extremist, several party officials met with figures associated with the MAGA movement.

== Ideology ==
The MAGA movement has been described as right-wing. President Joe Biden described movement's ideology as "semi-fascism". According to Ian Goldin, a professor of globalization at the University of Oxford, movement was economic inequality and economic anxiety contributed to the growth of the movement, and those conditions persisted during Trump's second term.

=== Immigration ===
Polling has found strong support among MAGA Republicans for restrictive immigration policies. According to a poll reported by Politico, 87% of Trump voters in 2024 supported deportation efforts exceeding those undertaken during the administration of President Dwight D. Eisenhower in the 1950s. Between January 27 and February 6 of 2026, NBC News Decision Desk Poll powered by SurveyMonkey, surveyed over 20,000 adults online. The survey found that 74 percent of self-identified MAGA Republicans supported federal immigration agents wearing masks.

=== Internal conflicts ===
According to Politico, the MAGA movement has been experienced internal ideological conflicts since as early as December 2016 when members of the movement conflicted over ideologies at inauguration parties. An instance of a prominent conflict has been characterized at the extremes by the divide between the nativist ideology of the groups such as the Groypers and Nick Fuentes on one end and the pro-immigration technolibertarians such as Elon Musk on the other.

After the October 7 attacks and the subsequent Gaza war, disagreements emerged among figures associated with the MAGA movement regarding U.S. support for Israel and the legitimacy of the State of Israel. These divisions extended to interpretations of the USS Liberty incident. The political commentator Ben Shapiro, Texas senator Ted Cruz, and the National Review's editor-in-chief, Rich Lowry, supported the conclusions of the Naval Court of Inquiry and the government of Israel that the attack was accidental, while the commentators Tucker Carlson and Candace Owens, and Arizona representative Paul Gosar argued that the attack was intentional.

== Composition ==
According to Laura K. Field in Furious Minds (2025), intellectuals in the MAGA movement comprise several primary ideological associations centered around differing ideals yet connected through a collective disdain for liberalism. Field's groupings include individuals associated with the Claremont Institute, postliberals, and Christian nationalists; Field additionally noted the existence of a loose collective on the peripheries of the MAGA movement that engages in a hypermasculine and Chauvinistic aesthetic and rhetoric with absurdist names, such as Raw Egg Nationalist and Bronze Age Pervert.

As of November 2025, over a third of Republicans do not consider themselves to be MAGA Republicans, according to a Politico poll.

=== Notable individuals ===
==== Charlie Kirk ====
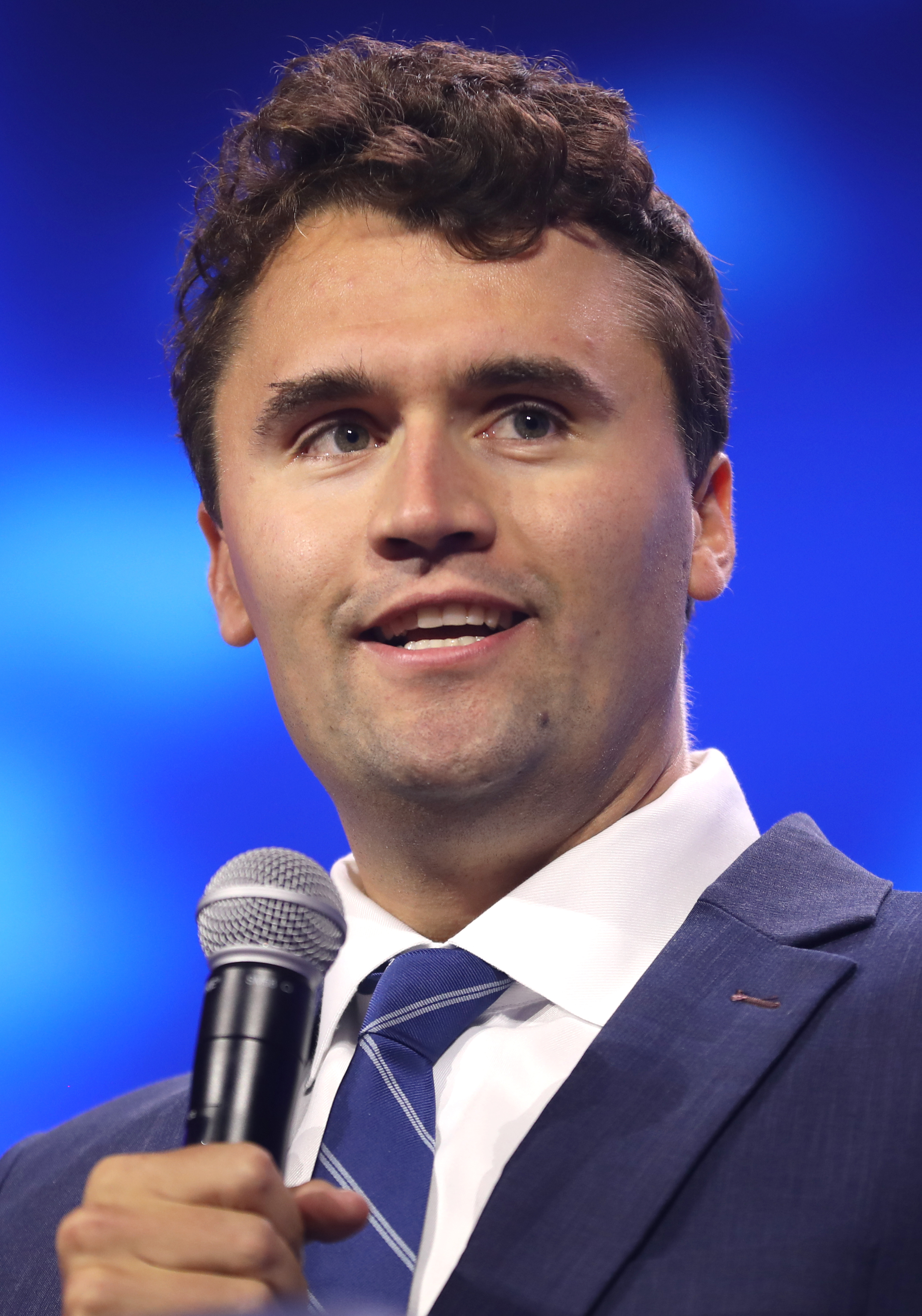
Charlie Kirk at the 2023 Turning Point Action Conference

Charlie Kirk was a right-wing activist, podcaster, and ally of Donald Trump who became associated with the MAGA movement through his work with younger conservatives. Kirk primarily built his career off of interacting with young people. He was best known for being the co-founder and CEO of Turning Point USA (TPUSA); an organization which aims at mobilizing conservative youth, and briefly served as chairman of Students for Trump. Kirk was assassinated on September 10, 2025, while speaking at a Utah Valley University event hosted by Turning Point USA as part of its American Comeback Tour.

Commentators have described some of Kirk's positions as being pro-life, transphobic, and anti-gun control. He has also been accused of echoing white nationalist talking points associated with the Great Replacement theory.

Donald Trump credited Charlie Kirk with helping increase support among young voters following his victory in the 2024 United States presidential election.

==== Ben Shapiro ====
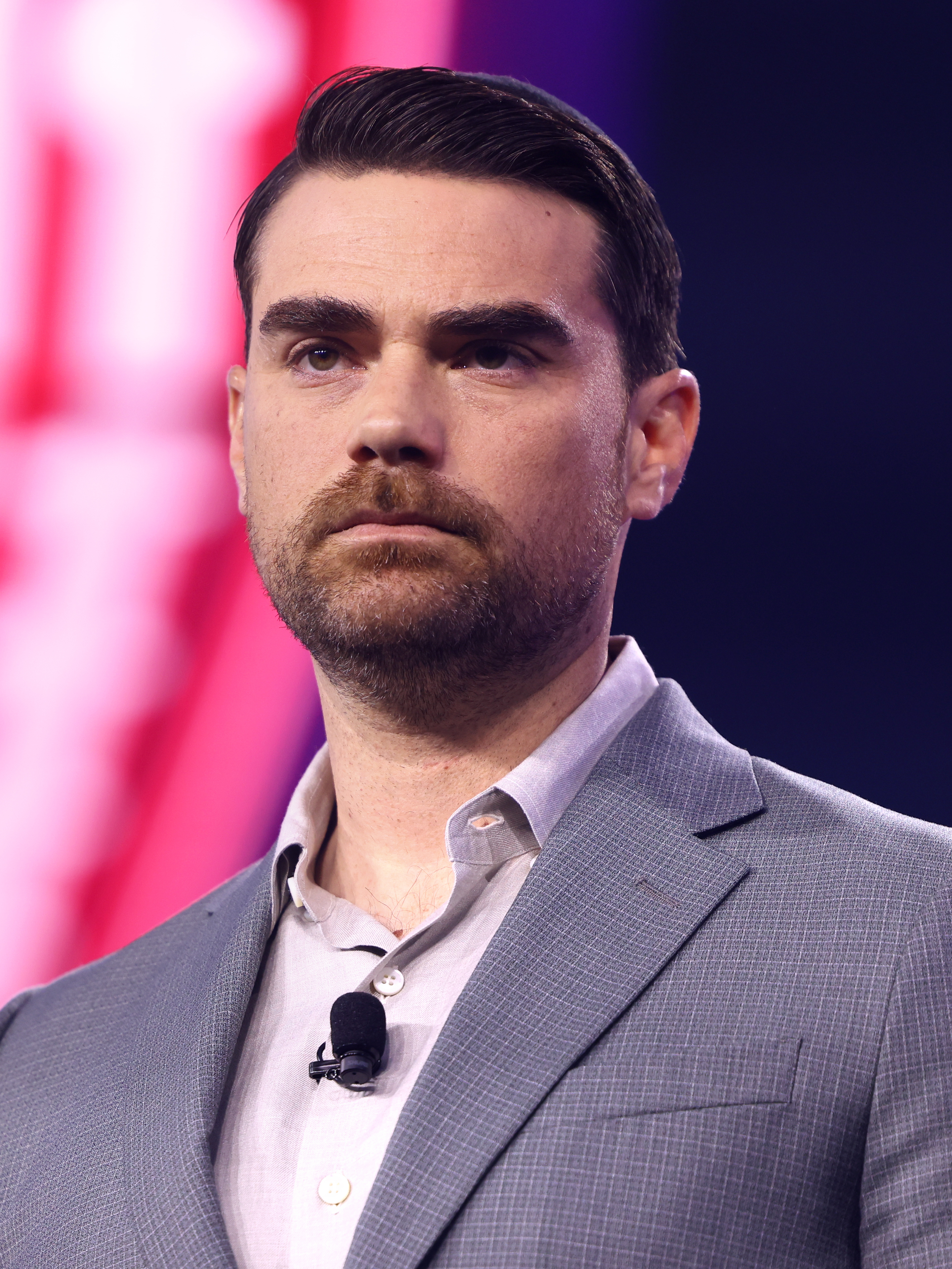
Ben Shapiro at America Fest 2024

Right-wing political commentator Ben Shapiro is a prominent media figure associated with the MAGA movement and the broader American conservative movement. He is best known as the co-founder and chief executive officer of The Daily Wire.

==== Nick Fuentes ====
Nick Fuentes is a far-right podcaster and internet personality who supported Trump in the 2016 and 2020 presidential elections. By 2024, however, he had become increasingly critical of Trump and stated that he did not vote in that election. During Trump's second term, Fuentes criticized the administration over it policies toward Israel and its handling of matters related to the Epstein files.

In March 2026, he encouraged his followers to vote Democrat as part of his criticism of the Trump administration.

Fuentes has been criticized by figures associated with the MAGA movement, including Ben Shapiro and Mark Levin, while others, including Megyn Kelly and Tucker Carlson, have defended or even embraced him.

==== Political theorists ====
Political theorist Patrick Deneen, a professor at the University of Notre Dame and author of Why Liberalism Failed (2018), has been described as influential among intellectuals associated with the MAGA movement.

== See also ==
- Know Nothing
- Bolsominion
- Diehard Duterte Supporters
