= Gladden Pappin =

Political theorist and editor

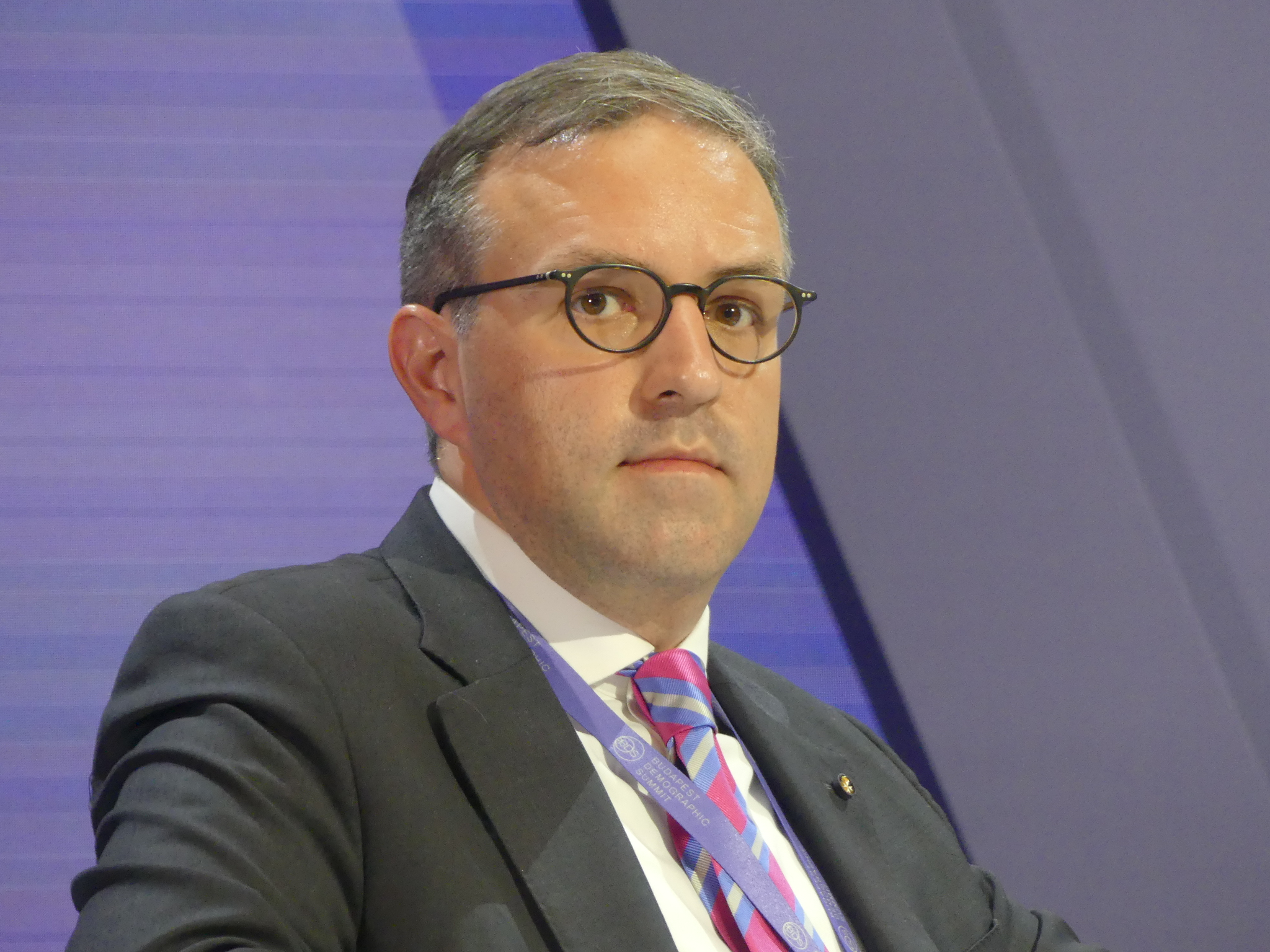
- Born: 1982 (age 43–44); St. Louis, Missouri, U.S.

Academic background
- Education: Harvard University (BA, MA, PhD)

Academic work
- Institutions: University of Dallas · Mathias Corvinus Collegium

Gladden Pappin (born 1982) is an American political scientist. He was the president of the Hungarian Institute of International Affairs, Hungary's foreign policy research institute of state, from 2023 to 2026. A political theorist, he was formerly associate professor of politics at the University of Dallas. From 2021 to 2023 he was a visiting senior fellow at the Mathias Corvinus Collegium in Budapest, Hungary. He is cofounder and deputy editor of American Affairs, as well as cofounder of Postliberal Order.

== Biography ==
Pappin was born in St. Louis, Missouri, and is a citizen of the Osage Tribal Nation. He attended Harvard University, where he earned his B.A., magna cum laude, in history in 2004 and then his M.A. and Ph.D. in government in 2012 under Harvey Mansfield. His undergraduate thesis explored questions of rights, polity and the common good in Jean Gerson and Nicholas of Cusa, while his PhD addressed the question of "political novelty."

As an undergraduate, Pappin served as editor of the Harvard Salient, a conservative student newspaper. He courted controversy in 2002 by editorializing against efforts to reverse the proceedings of the Secret Court of 1920, a disciplinary tribunal in which the university expelled eight students for their alleged homosexuality. Pappin defended the expulsion as a proper exercise of in loco parentis and wrote "Such punishments would apply to heterosexuals, of course, but even more so to homosexuals, whose activities are not merely immoral but perverted and unnatural." Pappin's editorializing prompted allegations of bigotry and homophobia from the Harvard Crimson. Two of Pappin's co-editors of the Harvard Salient resigned in protest of his positions.

From 2013 to 2017, Pappin held fellowships at the University of Notre Dame's Institute for Advanced Studies and the Center for Ethics and Culture. From 2017 to 2024, he was a permanent research fellow and senior adviser of the de Nicola Center for Ethics and Culture at the University of Notre Dame.

During the 2016 U.S. presidential election, he joined Julius Krein and Michael Anton as one of the pseudonymous writers for the blog the Journal of American Greatness. After the blog closed in summer 2016, Pappin joined Krein in cofounding American Affairs, a quarterly journal of policy and political thought. The inaugural issue of American Affairs was launched February 21, 2017.

According to The Atlantic, Pappin believed that Trump provided an opportunity for proponents of Catholic integralism to obtain political power. At an Integralist conference shortly after the 2016 election, Pappin "predicted that Trump would dissolve Congress, at which point the pope would anoint Melania Trump, who is Catholic, to rule the United States as queen." Pappin also befriended author JD Vance, who shared his interest in postliberalism. Vance headlined a conference on postliberalism at Franciscan University of Steubenville co-organized by Pappin, and featuring other postliberal speakers including Patrick Deneen, Adrian Vermeule, Sohrab Ahmari, John A. Burtka IV, and Rachel Bovard. After Vance entered political office in 2023, Pappin became a frequent visitor to his offices in the U.S. Senate and as Vice President.

In 2017, Pappin joined the University of Dallas as an assistant professor of politics, and was promoted to associate professor with tenure in 2021. In September 2021, Pappin moved to Budapest, Hungary, as a visiting senior fellow of the Mathias Corvinus Collegium. Pappin stated at the time that he decided to relocate to Hungary after receiving gay pride themed advertising catalogs in the mail at his home in Dallas. He claimed that these advertisements showed that the American economy had been captured by the what he called the “the globo-homo complex” as a result of the U.S. conservative movement's embrace of "libertarian economics" and "the introduction of the laissez-faire mentality into the moral realm."

In 2023, then-Hungarian Prime Minister Viktor Orban named Pappin to the presidency of the Hungarian Institute of International Affairs, a government-funded foreign policy research institute that reports directly to the Prime Minister. In November 2025, Pappin accompanied Orban to a meeting with President Trump that secured Hungarian exemptions from U.S.-imposed sanctions on Russian energy due to the Russo-Ukrainian War. Following the delegation's meeting with Trump at the White House, JD Vance hosted Orban and Pappin for a private dinner at the Vice President's residence.

According to The Atlantic, Pappin's mutual connections between Orban and Vance helped to bring Vance to Hungary in April 2026. The U.S. Vice President spoke at several political rallies in support of Orban's unsuccessful reelection campaign.

In July 2026, following a change in government in Hungary, Pappin resigned from the presidency of the Hungarian Institute of International Affairs.

Pappin is a member of the Sovereign Military Order of Malta and the Sacred Military Constantinian Order of St. George.

== Political beliefs ==
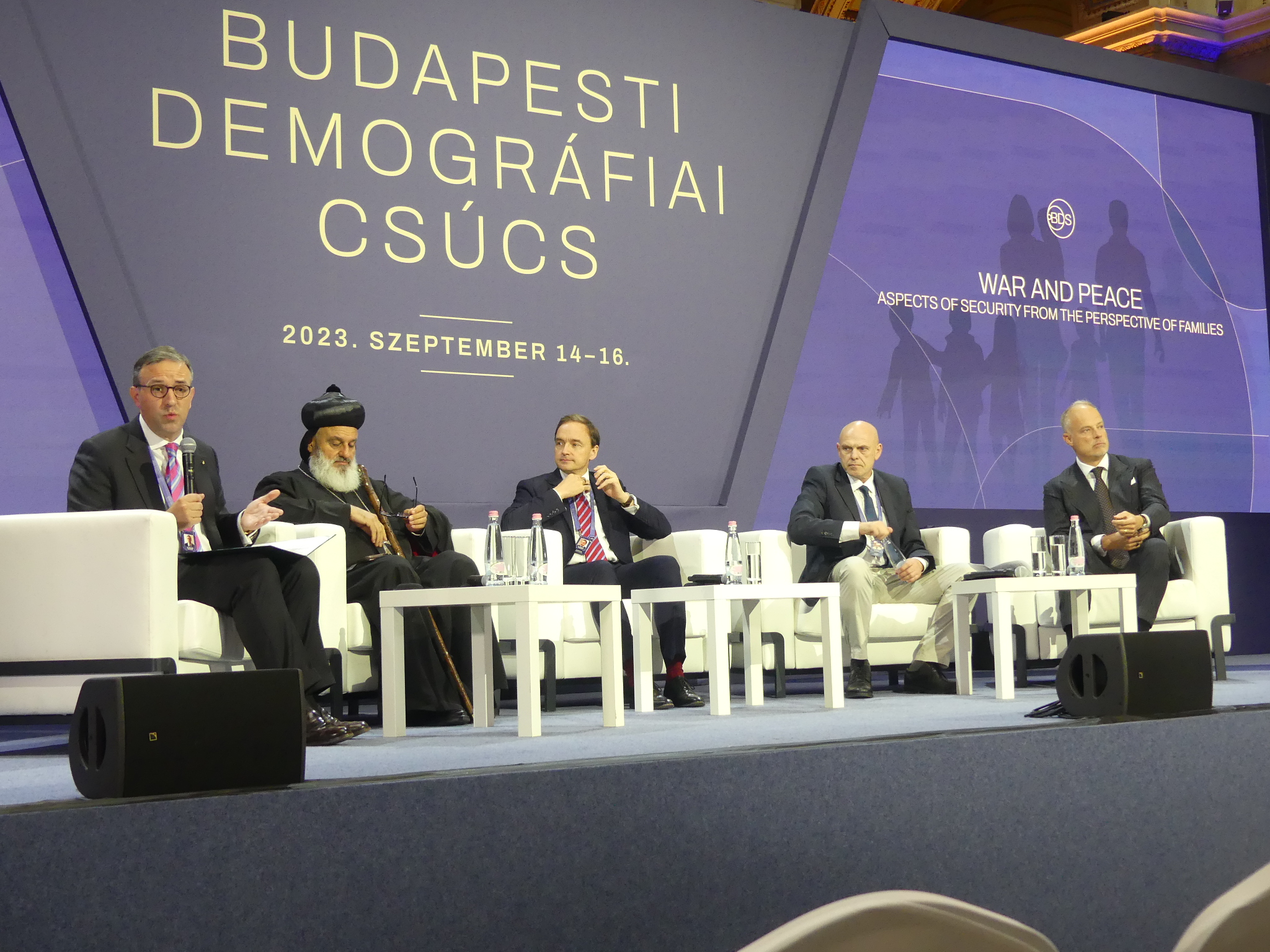
Speaking at Budapest Demographic Summit 2023

Pappin has articulated a political stance emphasizing family policy, national sovereignty and postliberalism. He cofounded the Substack Postliberal Order in 2021 along with Patrick Deneen, C. C. Pecknold and Adrian Vermeule.

=== Critique of fusionism ===
In the launch issue of American Affairs, Pappin criticized the dominance of neoliberalism over the American Left as well as Right:

What has passed as political centrism in recent years was a mixture of social liberalism (at least, limited resistance to social liberalism’s further advance) and economic globalization. This platform earned the name centrism only as a description of the overlapping portion of the Venn diagram of positions held by Washington-based policy experts and their coastal backers. Democrats offered participation in the further advance of progressive social arrangements for a constituency mixed of urban elites and legacy working-class voters. Republicans offered rhetorical objection to the progressive social agenda and deployed patriotic rhetoric in defense of economic policies primarily benefiting the business elite. The constituency supporting this form of centrism is small when considered geographically, and smaller than it seems even in the coastal regions dedicated to it. The forms of argument deployed to defend this centrism never appeal to the political interests of most Americans because their goals lie beyond the scope of national politics: borders must be erased for the sake of global humanitarianism and for the needs of global business.

=== Role of the state ===
Pappin has argued that American conservatism is dominated by skepticism of state power, and has argued instead for a robust conservative role for the state.

Rather than asking the question “What should conservatives/progressives do?” considerable advances can be made through certain purely practical considerations: “How can the integrity of the national political community be assured?” “How can commercial activity and technological development continue to be turned toward the common good, and toward our own strategic advantage?” “What can we do with the reins of power, that is, the state, to ensure the common good of our citizens?” Questions such as these are not “antiliberal”—they are simply questions that one asks when one’s political thinking isn’t distorted by liberal limitations on the scope of politics.

=== Family policy ===
Since 2019, Pappin has advocated for a family policy modeled on the Hungarian example. He wrote in American Affairs:

Republicans and Democrats alike are looking for ways to support stable family structures, in order to facilitate the choice to start or grow a family for Americans who wish to do so. The modest, existing forms of family support, chiefly in the form of tax credits, have not and almost certainly will not achieve these goals. A more robust proposal would include a mixture of direct cash transfers . . . credits toward child-related expenditures . . . and possible investment toward future expenses.

=== Multipolarity ===
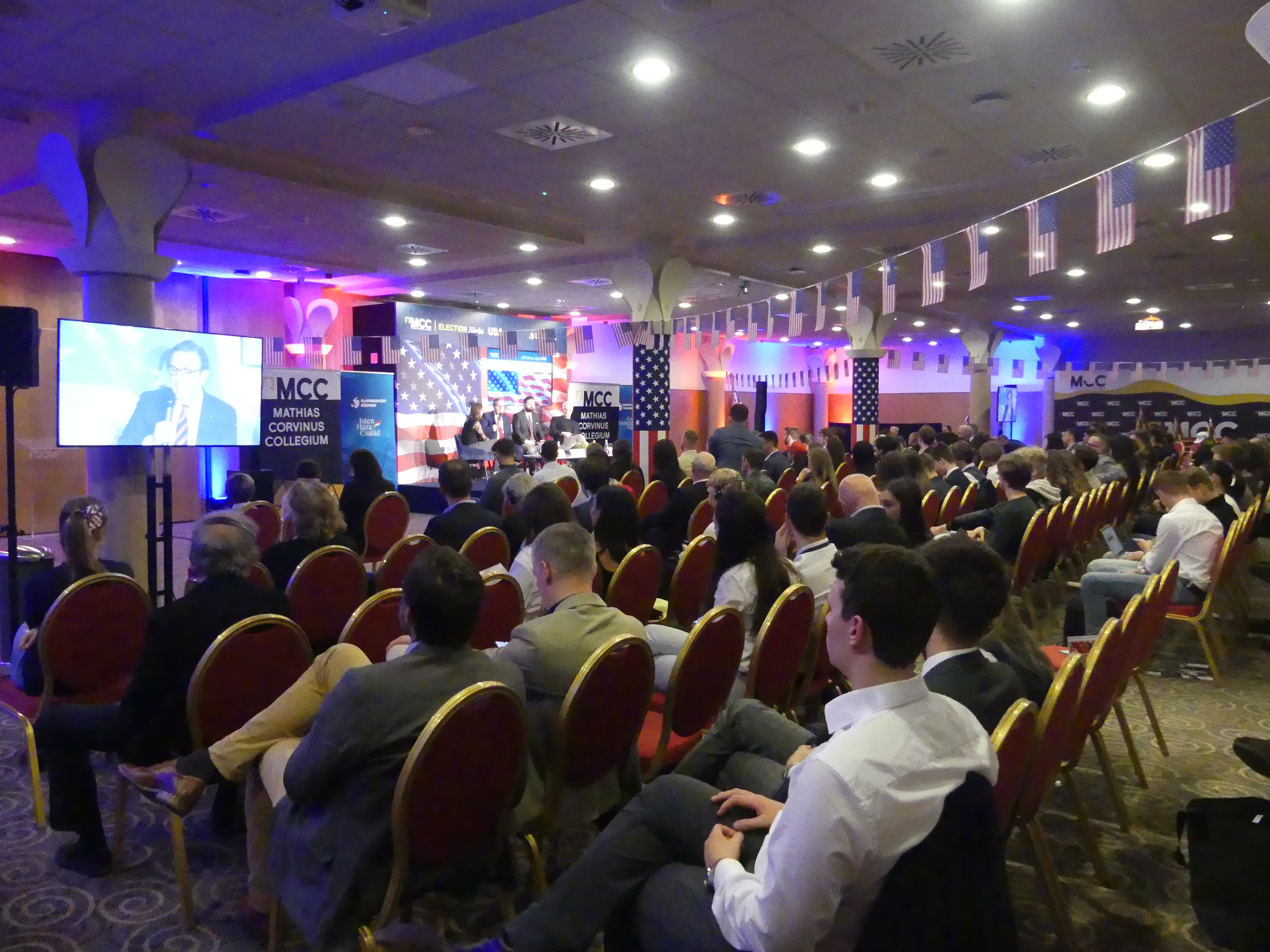
With Peter Boghossian and Miklós Szánthó at MCC-CFR Election Night 2024

At Postliberal Order, Pappin has written:

The most striking feature of the new "multipolar" world is that Western liberals no longer believe in the power of commerce to turn the rest of the world toward liberal democracy. Given that, we might ask: is it not more important for nations to take a practical approach to the emerging circumstances, rather than fall in line with our increasingly brittle liberal empire?
