= Regime Change: Toward a Postliberal Future =

2023 book by Patrick Deneen

- First edition
- Author: Patrick Deneen
- Language: English
- Published: June 6, 2023
- Publisher: Sentinel
- Pages: 288
- ISBN: 978-0593086902

Regime Change: Toward a Postliberal Future is a 2023 book by Patrick Deneen, a professor of political science at the University of Notre Dame. It extends his critique of liberalism from Why Liberalism Failed and develops a broader view of a postliberal politics.

== Synopsis ==
Regime Change discusses how liberalism can be replaced with a form of post-liberal conservatism that strives for the "common good". Deneen describes the postliberal future as a mixed regime that rejects democratic pluralism and an "invasive progressive tyranny". He advocates a return to "traditional" views on marriage, family and sexual identity along with a renewal of Christianity. He describes this as brought about by a "self-conscious aristoi" dispensing with liberal notions of freedom and equality and advancing aristopopulism. He advocates for the "blending" of a conservative elite over a non-liberal populace until it becomes "one thing", to be achieved through the "raw assertion of political power".

== Reviews ==
Jennifer Szalai for The New York Times wrote, "The confidence (and condescension) is breathtaking ... Deneen's worldview is unrelentingly zero-sum ... Underneath all the gemütlich verbs lurks a suggestion that some readers may find chilling: a vision of the "common good" so obvious to Deneen that it's not up for debate or discussion."

In a review for The Times, Jason Cowley wrote, "So what if anything comes after liberalism? This is where Deneen's argument becomes incoherent. He is strong on rhetoric, but weak on policy prescriptions and for a conservative can sound alarmingly like a revolutionary [...] If for him liberalism is the god that failed, he also remains hopeful, yet ultimately cannot explain how the transformative politics he seeks will come into effect."

Writing in The Wall Street Journal, Barton Swaim argued that Regime Change contained the same faults as Deneen's earlier book Why Liberalism Failed, which he described as being an "eloquent expression" of the traditionalist and anticapitalist outlook. He criticized Regime Change for adding dishonesty, accusing Deneen of selectively interpreting the history of conservative thought and misrepresenting opposing arguments to make his alternative political vision seem more original and convincing than it really is.
