= Regime Change (disambiguation) =

Regime change is the partly forcible or coercive replacement of one government regime with another.

Regime Change may also refer to:

- Regime Change: Inside the Imperial Presidency of Donald Trump, a 2026 book by Maggie Haberman and Jonathan Swan
- Regime Change: Toward a Postliberal Future, a 2023 book by Patrick Deneen
