= José Pérez Adán =

Spanish sociologist (born 1952)

José Pérez Adán (born 1952 in Cartagena, Spain) is a Spanish sociologist. He holds a teaching and research position in Sociology at the University of Valencia (Spain). He is a charter member of the Valencian Institute of Fertility, Sexuality and Family Relations (IVAF) and of the Inter-American Foundation for Science and Life. He is a co-founder and board member of the Latin-American Association of Communitarianism (AIC). He presides over the Spanish chapter of the Society for the Advancement of Socioeconomics, and is general coordinator of the Free International University of the Americas (ULIA). He does research and teaches on Socioeconomics, Communitarianism, Family Relations, and Environmental Studies, and is the principal Spanish language popularizer of the thought of Amitai Etzioni.

== Education ==
Pérez Adán obtained his doctorate (PhD) at Macquarie University (Sydney, Australia).

== Works ==
Author until 2008 of 40 books and 100 scientific articles. Among his published works the following stand out:

- Sociología: concepto y usos. Pamplona: Eunsa, 1997 ISBN 84-313-1496-6
- Socioeconomía. Madrid: Trotta, 1997 ISBN 84-8164-134-0
- Sociedad y Medio Ambiente. Madrid: Trotta, 1999 ISBN 84-8164-164-2
- La Salud Social. Madrid: Trotta, 1999 ISBN 84-8164-322-X
- Desarrollo Socioeconómico y Evolución Demográfica. Pamplona: Eunsa, 1999 ISBN 84-313-1701-9
- Las Terceras Vías. Madrid: Eiunsa, 2001 ISBN 84-8469-018-0
- Pensar la familia. Madrid: Palabra, 2001 ISBN 84-8239-583-1
- Diez Temas de Sociología. Madrid: Eiunsa, 2002 ISBN 84-8469-057-1
- Rebeldías. Madrid: Sekotia, 2002 ISBN 84-932920-2-8
- Comunitarismo. Madrid: Sekotia, 2003 ISBN 84-932920-9-5
- Sociología de la Familia y de la Sexualidad. Valencia: Edicep, 2004 ISBN 84-7050-821-0
- Repensar la Familia. Madrid: Eiunsa, 2005 ISBN 84-8469-136-5
- Cine y Sociedad: Prácticas de Ciencias Sociales. Madrid: Eiunsa, 2006 ISBN 84-8469-122-5
- Sociología del desarrollo sostenible. Valencia: Edicep, 2005 ISBN 978-84-7050-822-6
- Sociología: Comprender la Humanidad en el Siglo XXI. Madrid: Eiunsa, 2006 ISBN 84-8469-181-0
- Adiós Estado, bienvenida Comunidad. Madrid: Eiunsa, 2008 ISBN 978-84-8469-239-3

== See also ==
- Socioeconomics
- Communitarianism
