= American Affairs =

Quarterly American political journal

- Editor and founder: Julius Krein
- Assistant Editor: Gladden Pappin
- Categories: Politics
- Frequency: Quarterly
- First issue: February 2017; 9 years ago
- Company: American Affairs Foundation Inc.
- Country: United States
- Based in: Boston
- Language: English
- Website: americanaffairsjournal.org
- ISSN: 2475-8809

American Affairs is a quarterly American political journal founded in February 2017 by Julius Krein.

Its project has been outlined in Tablet as: "a dense, technically sophisticated form of neo-Hamiltonian economic nationalism, pushed in various forms by Michael Lind, David P. Goldman, and Krein himself," based on the contention that "a short-sighted American elite has allowed the country’s manufacturing core—the key to both widespread domestic prosperity and national security in the face of a mercantilist China—to be hollowed out," just as "Production and technical expertise have shifted to China and Asia, domestic capital has flowed into unproductive share buybacks or tech schemes (Uber, WeWork), and America has become a country with a two-tiered service economy, with bankers, consultants, and software engineers at the top and Walmart greeters and Uber drivers at the bottom."

Since its founding in 2017, American Affairs has become known for in-depth articles on trade and industrial policy, criticisms of financialization, advocacy of family childcare allowances and infrastructure spending, as well as for bringing together right and left-wing critics of neoliberalism. Aside from public policy, it has also covered political theory and cultural criticism. It has been characterized in the New Statesman as a "heterodox policy journal" featuring, for instance, conservative arguments in favor of a greater role for the state alongside left-wing arguments against identity politics and open borders. Notable articles include Krein's "The Real Class War" which "attracted attention from both left and right in November 2019 by upending the conversation over class in the Democratic primary," according to New Statesman.

== History ==
A predecessor to American Affairs is the Journal of American Greatness, a short-lived 2016 political blog best known for publishing "The Flight 93 Election," a widely read essay about the 2016 presidential election by the pseudonymous author Publius Decius Mus, later revealed to be Michael Anton.

American Affairs was initially considered by some as a "pro-Trump journal." On its launch, it was described by the New York Times as "dedicated to giving intellectual heft and coherence to the amorphous ideology known, for lack of a better term, as Trumpism." But in August 2017, after the "Unite the Right" rally at Charlottesville, Virginia, Krein wrote an opinion article in The New York Times publicly acknowledging his regret in voting for the candidate. Jennifer Schuessler of The New York Times writes: "the magazine seeks to fill the void left by a conservative intellectual establishment more focused on opposing Mr. Trump than on grappling with the rejection of globalism and free-market dogma that propelled his victory."

According to The Washington Post, the journal was read by Vice President JD Vance as of 2022.

== Contributors ==
Contributors to the magazine include: Michael Anton, Robert D. Atkinson, Mehrsa Baradaran, Thierry Baudet, Daniel A. Bell, Fred Block, Dan Breznitz, Christopher Caldwell, Oren Cass, Angelo M. Codevilla, Colin Crouch, Patrick J. Deneen, Ronald W. Dworkin, Fredrik Erixon, Nancy Fraser, Amber A'Lee Frost, Frank Furedi, Maurice Glasman, James K. Galbraith, David P. Goldman, Allen C. Guelzo, Ofir Haivry, Shadi Hamid, James Hankins, Yoram Hazony, Joseph Heath, Arthur Herman, John B. Judis, Eric Kaufmann, Joel Kotkin, Ryszard Legutko, Michael Lind, Edward Luttwak, Bruno Maçães, Noel Malcolm, Pierre Manent, Lawrence M. Mead, Bill Mitchell, Angela Nagle, David Oks, Eric A. Posner, R.R. Reno, Ganesh Sitaraman, Anne-Marie Slaughter, Matthew Stoller, Wolfgang Streeck, Cass Sunstein, Ruy Teixiera, Nick Timothy, Roberto M. Unger, Adrian Vermeule, Henry Williams, L. Randall Wray, and Slavoj Zizek.
