= Front Porch Republic =

American Communitarian blog

- Website type: Blog
- Website: http://www.frontporchrepublic.com/
- Launched: 2009
- Current status: Active

Front Porch Republic is a localist and communitarian American blog where various contributors – known as 'porchers' – emphasize the importance of concepts such as community, place, decentralism, and conservation. Front Porch Republic publishes books under the name Front Porch Republic Books, an imprint of Wipf and Stock. It also sponsors an annual conference and, beginning in 2019, publishes the journal Local Culture.

== Ideology ==
Porchers have myriad opinions, but generally agree that centralization, atomization, and disregard for limits represent obstacles to human flourishing.

Damon Linker describes Front Porch Republic in The Week:

Unlike the leaders of the mainstream conservative movement, Patrick Deneen, Mark T. Mitchell, Russell Arben Fox, Jeremy Beer, and the other "Porchers" have little interest in engaging with inside-the-Beltway power politics. Instead, they prefer to act as gadflies, denouncing the imperial ethos and influence-peddling that dominates Washington, as well as the boundless greed that drives would-be Masters of the Universe from around the country to seek their fortunes on Wall Street and in Hollywood and Silicon Valley.

== Staff ==
As of December 2014, the staff running the website were:

President	Editor-in-Chief	Senior Editors
Mark Mitchell	Jeffrey Bilbro	Jeremy Beer
		Katherine Dalton
		Patrick Deneen
		James Matthew Wilson
		Jason Peters
		Jeffrey Polet
