= Laura K. Field =

Writer and political analyst

Laura K. Field, 2026

Laura K. Field is a writer and political analyst. Her early education was in Canada before she later moved to the United States to study at the University of Texas at Austin. Her first book is titled Furious Minds: The Making of the MAGA New Right which was published in 2025.

== Life ==
She graduated from University of Alberta, and University of Texas at Austin. She taught at Rhodes College, Georgetown University, and American University.

She was a fellow at the Niskanen Center, and Brookings Institution.

== Academic research ==
Field, in her 2025 book, Furious Minds, has tried to indicate the intellectual brain trust supporting Trump's Project 2025 movement by identifying and documenting the top 35 participants in the New Right movement which encompasses Claremonters, Postliberals, National Conservatives and the Hard Right. She starts the study with her review of leading academic figures for the MAGA New Right, which she views as originating with academic scholars Leo Strauss and Harry Jaffa. The list of scholars she identifies is presented as including the following participants some or whom are retired or deceased as of 2025, listed as:

- Sohrab Ahmari, Postliberal and journalist.
- Costin Alamariu, Hard Right and Yale PhD.
- Michael Anton, author under "Publius Decius Mus" moniker.
- Larry P. Arnn, Claremonter and Claremont PhD.
- Steve Bannon, Hard Right and Trump strategist.
- Darren Beattie, Hard Right and Duke PhD.
- Allan Bloom, died 1992 and leading Straussian.
- Tucker Carlson, Hard Right and journalist at Fox News.
- Charles Cornish-Dale, Hard Right, and Oxford and Cambridge graduate.
- Chris Demouth, National Conservative and formerly with AEI.
- Patrick Deneen, Postliberal and Professor at Notre Dame.
- Ron Desantis, Governor of Florida.
- John C. Eastman, Claremonter and Director at Claremont Institute.
- Samuel T. Francis, died 2005 and Paleoconservative.
- Robert P. George, Leading Catholic intellectual at Princeton University.
- Paul Gottfried, Paleoconservative and writer.
- Josh Hammer, National Conservative and University of Chicago JD.
- Yoram Hazony, National Conservative and author of The Virtue of Nationalism (2018).
- Harry V. Jaffa, died 2015 and West Coast Straussian.
- Leo Strauss, died 1973, Professor at University of Chicago, patriarch of Straussians.

== Works ==
- Field, Laura K. (2025-11-04). Furious Minds: The Making of the MAGA New Right. Princeton: Princeton University Press. ISBN 978-0-691-25526-2.
