= African communalism =

Societal archetype

African communalism or African communitarianism refers to the traditional manner in which rural areas of Africa have functioned historically. In Africa, society existed for decades without formal hierarchies and equal access to resources for all in ways that resemble forms of egalitarianism and socialism. Some elements of this way of life persist to the present day.

African communalism is a moral doctrine that also values human dignity, rights, and responsibilities, according to philosopher Polycarp Ikuenobe. Ikuenobe argues that "African communalism does not necessarily see a conflict between individuals and community; they are mutually supportive, and people are required to have the moral attitude of contributing to the community for their own well-being. This attitude creates the priority of duty, which is for the fundamental goal of creating a community, in order to provide the material conditions for actualizing individuals’ substantive rights and well-being."

There have been philosophical challenges to this conception of African communalism: philosopher Olúfẹ́mi Táíwò argues that current conceptions of African communalism are notorious for their "murkiness," and that more sophisticated conceptions of this philosophy are needed to justify its prevalence in modern philosophical discourse. In addition, Táíwò asserts that current conceptions of African communalism do not accurately reflect current political climates in Africa, and more modern philosophies are needed to guide that continent in the twenty-first century.

Some African scholars have held the view of "extreme communitarianism", in which Africans are intrinsically community-orientated. This was encapsulated by John Mbiti's adage "I am because we are", implying human experience is defined by their relationships. This has been criticised as an oversimplification, and that analysing African societies through comparison to Western "individualistic" ones omits indigenous conceptions and masks individualistic thinking traditionally present. Another view is "moderate communitarianism", emphasising solidarity, friendliness, and collegiality, but also temperance, self-control, and self-determination. African traditional society is seen as pragmatic, where individuality and community are encouraged in different contexts.
