= Wipf and Stock =

American publishing house

- Founded: 1995
- Founder: John Wipf; Jon Stock
- Country of origin: United States
- Headquarters location: Eugene, Oregon
- Distribution: Ingram, Baker & Taylor (US); Morning Star Publishing (Australia); Bertrams, Gardners Books (Europe); KCBS (Korea)
- Publication types: books, academic journals
- Nonfiction topics: theology, biblical studies, history and philosophy
- Imprints: Wipf & Stock; Cascade Books; Pickwick Publications; Resource Publications; Slant; Front Porch Republic Books
- Official website: wipfandstock.com

Wipf and Stock is a publisher in Eugene, Oregon, publishing works in theology, biblical studies, history and philosophy.

== History ==
Wipf and Stock was established in 1995 following a joint venture between John Wipf of the Archives Bookshop in Pasadena, California, and Jon Stock of Windows Booksellers in Eugene, Oregon. The company publishes new works and reprints under the imprints Wipf & Stock, Cascade Books, Pickwick Publications, Resource Publications, Slant, and Front Porch Republic Books. Cascade Books is aimed at the general public, whereas Pickwick Publications caters to academics.

The publishing focus of Wipf & Stock is broad, with books in biblical studies, theology, ethics, church history, linguistics, history, classics, philosophy, preaching, and church ministry.

== Publishing model ==
Wipf and Stock has consolidated the publication process so that every aspect of production, from acquisitions and editing, to typesetting, printing, and binding happen in one location. It also employs short-run production methods. According to Wipf and Stock, this allows it to accept titles based on merit rather than on projected sales.

== Journals published ==
Wipf and Stock publishes Sehnsucht: a Journal on the Works of C. S. Lewis, first published in 2007, which it describes as the only peer-reviewed journal devoted to the study of C. S. Lewis and his writings.

It publishes the Journal of Latin American Theology, which had a special issue in collaboration with Memoria Indigena on Indigenous Theology. the Asian Journal of Pentecostal Studies and Kesher: A Journal of Messianic Judaism.

== Book retractions ==
In 2022, the Cascade imprint of Wipf and Stock retracted the book Bad and Boujee: Toward a Trap Feminist Theology. The book was retired following complaints raised on social media. Cascade apologized for the publication, lamenting the "inappropriateness of a White theologian writing about the experience of Black women."
