= Budapest Demographic Summit =

Biennial conference in Hungary

The Budapest Demographic Summit is an international right-wing conferences, that features politicians, church leaders, and activists, discussing issues including family politics, abortion and religious values. It is based in Budapest, Hungary.

First held in 2015, the summit takes place every two years.

== Conferences ==
=== 2019 ===
In 2019, former Australian prime minister Tony Abbott attend the summit with former Liberal cabinet minister Kevin Andrews for an address titled "Demography is Destiny: Families and Future Prosperity". During the summit Abbott talked about immigration.

=== 2021 ===
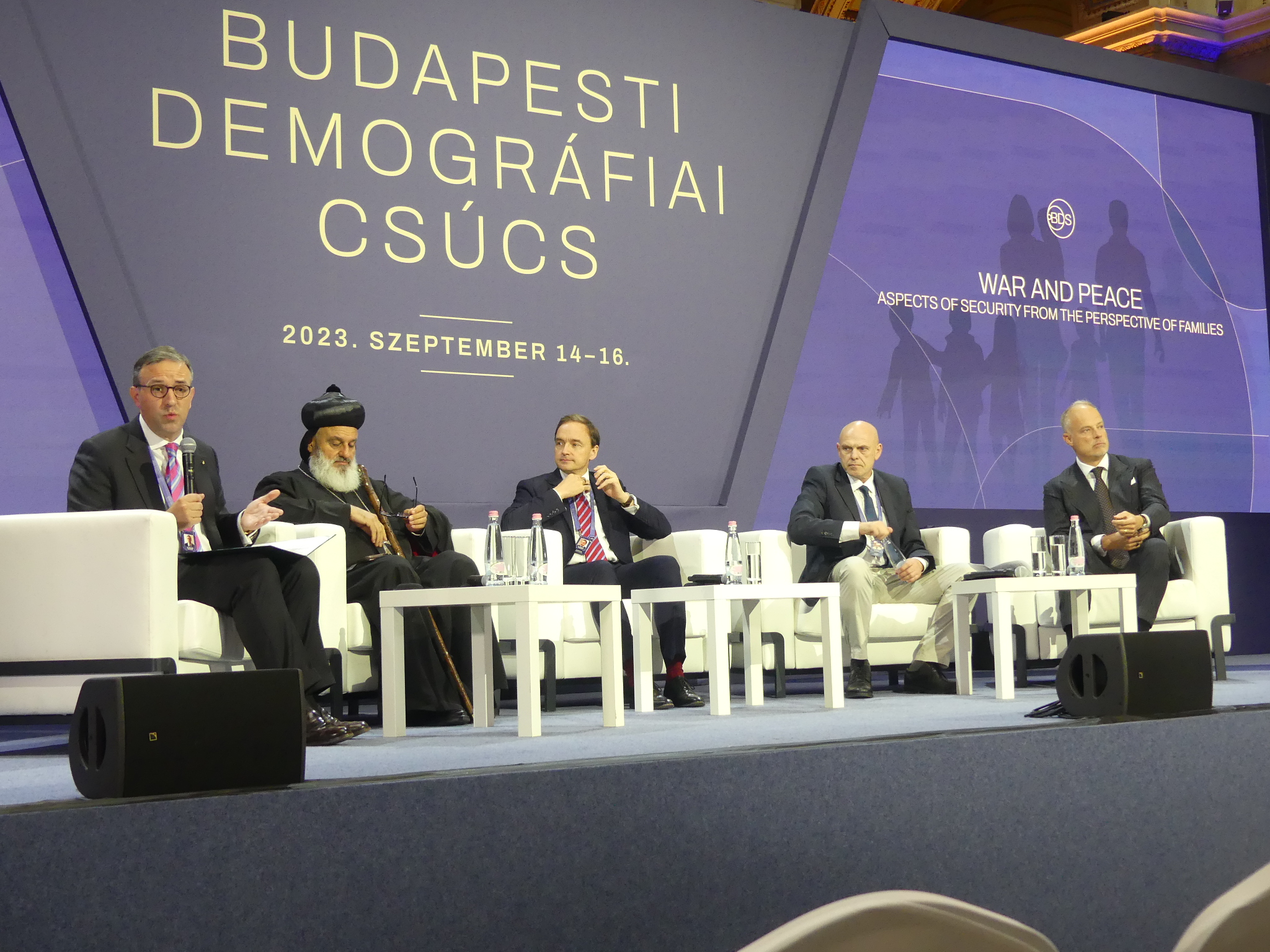
Gladden Pappin Speaking at Budapest Demographic Summit 2023

In 2021, former U.S. vice president Mike Pence, Serbian president Aleksandar Vučić, Bosnian Presidency member Milorad Dodik, Slovenian prime minister Janez Janša and Czech prime minister Andrej Babiš attend the summit.

== See also ==
- Danube Institute
