= Julius Krein =

American political writer and editor

Julius Krein (born 1986) is an American conservative political writer and editor best known for founding the journal American Affairs.

== Early life and education ==
Krein was raised in Eureka, South Dakota, the son of Gary and Nancy Krein. He has one sister. He graduated from Eureka High School in 2004. He is a 2008 graduate of Harvard College, where he studied political philosophy with Harvey Mansfield.

== Career ==
Krein went into a career in finance, working for Bank of America and the Blackstone Group. During the 2016 U.S. presidential election, he was employed at a hedge fund based in Boston while also contributing as a writer and site administrator for a pro-Trump blog. The blog, known as the Journal for American Greatness, was created supposedly to support Trump on the basis that his beliefs were politically sound. The blog's owners eventually took it offline, claiming it had begun as an inside joke and they were not prepared for such large readership. Its popularity led to Krein deciding to leave his day job to launch an authentic publication, American Affairs, a quarterly journal intended to support Trump from an intellectual perspective. He described it as an effort "to give the Trump movement some intellectual heft." Six months later, however, Krein publicly withdrew his support for Trump in a piece published in The New York Times, expressing regret over his prior support of Trump as president.

The inaugural issue of American Affairs was released February 21, one month after Trump's inauguration, which Krein intended to be the first of four issues for 2017. In an interview before its release, Krein stated he planned to have several dozen contributors and for each issue to include about 10 essays. The first issue included features on "the failure of standard conservative ideology," nationalism, fusionism, and academic free market theory. The issue received mixed reviews.

=== Denunciation of Trump ===
On August 17, 2017, following Trump's reaction to the events of the Charlottesville "Unite the Right" rally, Krein wrote an op-ed in The New York Times entitled "I Voted for Trump and I Sorely Regret It". Krein's public denunciation of Trump, in which he encouraged others to do the same, attracted significant media attention. In his op-ed, he lamented that he and his fellow Trump supporters were guilty of "deluding ourselves" during the 2016 election and that Trump's harshest critics had been proven right.

In an interview with Slate, Krein further explained how he had rationalized his public support for Trump prior to the Charlottesville rally. Krein stated that he did not feel Trump was legitimately racist. He told Slate, "I didn’t think the racist stuff was real. I thought it was media provocation. And that the economic or other stuff—that’s what he really cared about, and we are not electing a Pope, we are electing a president. If he gets even a couple things done, it’s good for the country, and by the way good for everybody."

== Political beliefs ==
Krein stated that he identifies himself as a conservative and a nationalist, but absolutely not a white nationalist. He also explained that he was very disillusioned with the Republican Party leadership, and that he felt Reaganomics had been a failure:

"To go back to nationalism, the biggest problem is the Republican mindset, the Reaganite mindset that we are all just individuals and let everyone loose to acquire wealth. That hasn't worked. Not only do we have rising inequality, but the people who defend rising inequality say it will lead to more productivity and the pie is going to be bigger blah blah. That hasn't happened, and no one has been willing to look at the deeper problems behind that."
