= Amitai Etzioni =

Israeli-American sociologist (1929–2023)

- אמיתי עציוני
- Born: Werner Falk; 4 January 1929; Cologne, Rhine Province, Prussia, Germany
- Died: 31 May 2023 (aged 94); Washington, D.C., U.S.
- Spouses: Chava Horowitz (m. 1953; div. 1964); Minerva Morales (m. 1965; died 1985); Patricia Kellogg (m. 1992)
- Children: 5, including Oren

Academic background
- Education: Hebrew University of Jerusalem (BA, MA); University of California, Berkeley (PhD)
- Doctoral advisor: Seymour Martin Lipset
- Other advisor: Martin Buber

Academic work
- Institutions: George Washington University; Harvard Business School; Columbia University
- Notable ideas: Socioeconomics, communitarianism

Amitai Etzioni (/ˈæmɪtaɪ ˌɛtsiˈoʊni/; Hebrew: אמיתי עציוני; né Werner Falk; 4 January 1929 – 31 May 2023) was an Israeli-American sociologist, best known for his work on socioeconomics and communitarianism. He founded the Communitarian Network, a non-profit, non-partisan organization dedicated to supporting the moral, social, and political foundations of society. He established the network to disseminate the movement's ideas. His writings argue for a carefully crafted balance between individual rights and social responsibilities, and between autonomy and order, in social structure. In 2001, he was named among the top 100 American intellectuals, as measured by academic citations, in Richard Posner's book, Public Intellectuals: A Study of Decline.

Etzioni was the Director of the Institute for Communitarian Policy Studies at The George Washington University, where he also served as a professor of International Affairs.

== Early life and education ==
Amitai Etzioni was born Werner Falk in Cologne, Germany in 1929 to a Jewish family. After fleeing Hitler and settling in Palestine in 1938, his family changed their last name to Etzioni.

By the time he turned five, both of his parents had escaped to London, which left Etzioni in the care of his grandparents. Etzioni was smuggled out of Germany soon afterwards, arriving at a train station in Italy with a non-Jewish relative, who soon reunited Etzioni with his parents. Etzioni was stuck with his parents in Athens, Greece for a year, unable to enter Palestine since his family was awarded a bachelor permit instead of a family permit. When the paperwork was finally resolved, Etzioni found himself learning Hebrew in Haifa, Mandatory Palestine in the winter of 1937.

At this time, he began to go by the first name Amitai instead of Werner, since the principal of Etzioni's new school strongly encouraged Etzioni to introduce himself by a Hebrew name. He was given the name Amitai based on the Hebrew word for truth (emet) and the name of Jonah's father in the Tanach (Amittai). Etzioni moved with his family to a small village, Herzliya Gimmel, which served as a base for an emerging community called Kfar Shmaryahu. When Etzioni was eight, he moved to the new village, where his family was assigned to a small, boxlike new house and a small farming lot. In the spring of 1941, during World War II, Etzioni's father enlisted in the British Army. He eventually served in the Jewish Brigade. Etzioni, at the age of thirteen, was struggling at school, which then caused his mother to send him to a boarding school in Ben Shemen.

In the spring of 1946, at the age of seventeen, Etzioni dropped out of high school to join the Palmach, the elite commando force of the Haganah, the underground army of the Jewish community of Palestine, and was sent to Tel Yosef for military training. When the Palmach learned that the British police had captured a list of the Palmach members, they were issued new, fake ID cards and had to choose new last names. Amitai Falk chose Etzioni, a pen name he had used when he started writing in Ben Shemen at age 15.

During Etzioni's time in the Palmach, it carried out a campaign of blowing up bridges and police stations to drive out the British, who were blocking Jews escaping post-Holocaust Europe from immigrating to Palestine and standing in the way of the establishment of a Jewish state. In contrast to the Irgun, the Palmach largely sought to affect British and global public opinion rather than cause casualties. Etzioni describes his early life and decision to join the Palmach in the video "The Making of a Peacenik". Etzioni's Palmach unit participated in the defense of Jerusalem, which was under siege by the Arab Legion. His unit sneaked through Arab lines to fight to defend Jerusalem and to open a corridor to Tel Aviv, participating in the Battles of Latrun and the establishment of the Burma Road.

Following the war, Etzioni spent a year studying at an institute established by Martin Buber. In 1951, he enrolled in the Hebrew University of Jerusalem, where he completed both BA (1954) and MA (1956) degrees in sociology. In 1957, he went to the United States to study at the University of California, Berkeley, and was a research assistant to Seymour Martin Lipset. He received his PhD in sociology in 1958, completing the degree in the record time of 18 months.

== Academic career ==
- 1958–1978: Professor, Columbia University
- 1978: Guest Scholar, Brookings Institution
- 1979–1980: Senior Advisor to the White House
- 1980–2010s: University Professor, Professor of International Affairs, and Director of the Institute for Communitarian Policy Studies, The George Washington University
- 1987–1990: Thomas Henry Carroll Ford Foundation Professor, Harvard Business School
- 1989: Founder and President of the Society for the Advancement of Socio-Economics
- 1993: Founder and Director of the Communitarian Network
- 1994–1995: President, American Sociological Association

== Work ==
Etzioni authored over 30 books. About half are academic, the most important of which is The Active Society, and half written for the public, especially The Spirit of Community. His early academic work focused on organizational theory, resulting in the often-cited A Comparative Analysis of Complex Organizations, published in 1961.

The book was well received in academic circles. A book review in Political Science Quarterly by Peter Fricke called it "a principal text for students of organizations." The book established Etzioni's academic credentials and led to many studies, which Etzioni reviewed and included in a revised edition of the same title, published in 1975. He expressed the same basic ideas in a much shorter book, Modern Organizations, which was translated into a large number of languages.

Much of Etzioni's best-known work is about communitarianism. According to Etzioni, communitarianism is centered on the communal definition of good. It thus stresses the role of community in social and political life and institutions. It rose in response to libertarianism and some forms of contemporary liberalism, both of which are centered on liberty and individual rights. Etzioni contrasts his version of what he calls "liberal communitarianism" with that championed by some East Asian public intellectuals, who extolled social obligations and accorded much less weight to liberty and individual rights.

Liberal communitarianism, as developed by Etzioni, formulated criteria for developing public policies that enable societies to deal with conflicts between the common good and individual rights. These include: (1) no major change in governing public policies and norms is justified unless society encounters serious challenges, (2) limitations on rights can be considered only if there are significant gains to the common good, and (3) adverse side effects that result from policy changes must be treated by introducing strong measures of accountability and oversight. Etzioni worked this out in two of his books, The Limits of Privacy (1999) and The New Normal (2015). Etzioni stresses that preferences are, to a significant extent, socially constructed and hence reflect the values of the communities people are members of. Therefore, one should not treat preferences as unadulterated expressions of individual freedom and should allow for public education to improve these preferences when they turn asocial and surely when they turn anti-social in dogmatic liberal societies.

His main communitarian books are The New Golden Rule (1996), The New Normal (2015), Law and Society in a Populist Age (2018), and How Patriotic is the Patriot Act (2005). His communitarian treatment of privacy is spelled out in The Limits of Privacy (1999) and Privacy in a Cyber Age (2015).

Etzioni's contributions to socioeconomics are found in The Moral Dimension (1988) and Happiness is the Wrong Metric (2018). His main argument is that, in neoclassical economics (the governing form of economics), predictions are poor, the theory about human nature is wrong-headed, and the normative implications are negative. He holds that, rather than assuming that people are seeking to maximize their own utility, one should assume that people are conflicted between (1) their commitments to moral values and the common good and (2) their self-interest. He hence characterized people as "moral wrestlers." He showed that people act mainly as members of social groups, rather than as free-standing agents. Typically, the main issue is not that the government interferes unduly in the market, but that concentrations of economic power in the private sector unduly affect the government and social life.

Etzioni considers The Active Society his most important work. The book was published in 1968. It starts by discussing philosophical questions about the extent to which people have free will and the extent to which human fate is predetermined, beyond our understanding and control. It dives into theories related to steering mechanisms that put people in control of inanimate systems, like factory machines, and then demonstrates that democratic processes must be involved in expanding this type of theory to societies and affecting history. Democracy is crucial, because people must participate in creating the signals to which they will respond.

Later, the book describes the four key parts of a social steering system: decision-making strategies, consensus-building, knowledge, and power. The last part of the book examines human needs and seeks to determine whether they can be altered or whether they remain static. If it is the latter (that human needs are constant), Etzioni looks for ways to guarantee that we restructure society to meet these fixed needs, instead of getting roped into a restructuring scheme that satisfies the needs that society is willing and able to meet, without regard for whether those are the needs that truly need to be met. The Active Society received positive feedback from reviewers, with one reviewer writing that:

I consider this to be one of the most important books in its field in the last twenty years. Apart from its substantive contribution to the strategy of societal activation, it offers a whole focus of immensely valuable perspectives for detailed empirical investigation in the future.

Betty Friedan wrote that The Active Society provided a "philosophical grounding" to her work as a leader of the women's movement. His last book, Reclaiming Patriotism, was published by University of Virginia Press in 2019.

Etzioni was active in the peace movement, the campaign against nuclear weapons, and the protests against the war in Vietnam. This led to two popular books, The Hard Way to Peace (1962) and Winning without War (1964), and, in later years, to From Empire to Community, Security First, Hot Spots, and Foreign Policy: Thinking Outside the Box. He spelled out ways to make China a partner in world order in Avoiding War with China (2017). His main argument in these books is that the world needs a global community and worldwide forms of governance; however, because people are strongly invested in nations, the world is not ready to transition to a global community. Hence, transnational arrangements must continue to be based on national representations. He shows that democracy must be largely homegrown and cannot be introduced by foreign powers through the use of force.

Etzioni has published many scores of academic articles, including law reviews, many of which can be found on SSRN, as well as hundreds of popular articles in the press and online. His papers are deposited with the Library of Congress.

The following books review Etzioni's work: Communitarian Foreign Policy: Amitai Etzioni's Vision, by Nikolas K. Gvosdev; The Active Society Revisited, edited by Wilson Carey McWilliams; Amitai Etzioni zur Einführung, written by Walter Reese-Schafer; and Etzioni's Critical Functionalism Communitarian Origins and Principles, by David Sciulli. See also a short documentary by Kevin Hudson, "The Making of a Peacenik."

In 2019, Etzioni celebrated his 90th birthday at Arena Stage, where he launched, curated, and moderated a series of civil dialogues, bringing together public intellectuals with differing points of view on various topics. The videos of these dialogues, as well as many of Etzioni's appearances on television, can be found on YouTube.

=== Criticism ===
In Simon Prideaux's "From Organisational Theory to the New Communitarium of Amitai Etzioni", he argues that Etzioni's communitarian methods are archaic, and based upon earlier functionalist definitions of organizations. This is because his methodology fails to address any possible contradictions within the socioeconomic foundations of society. Prideaux states that Etzioni's vision of a communitarian society is "heavily predicated upon what he sees as having gone wrong with present-day social relations"(Prideaux 70). Also, Etzioni's communitarian analysis uses a methodology which existed before the development of an organizational theory. According to Prideaux, Etzioni has taken the methodological influence of structural-functionalism beyond the realms of its organizational branch and fabricated it into a solution to solve the problems of modern society. Etzioni's arguments on the creation of a new communitarian society are restricted to the strengths and weaknesses he witnesses in the American society in which he has lived since the 1950s. This bias "neglects and denies the importance of differences within communities and among communities in different countries."

Elizabeth Frazer, in The Problems of Communitarian Politics: Unity and Conflict, argues that Etzioni's concept of the "nature of community" is vague and elusive, in regards to the idea that the community is involved with every stage of government policies. She also mentions Etzioni's thought that the community has a moral standing equal to that of the individual when she firmly believes it is just the opposite. Warren Breed's The Self-Guiding Society provides a critical overview of The Active Society. David Sciulli's Etzioni's Critical Functionalism: Communitarian Origins and Principles evaluates Etzioni's "functionalism".

Etzioni was criticized in 2016 for publishing an article titled "Should Israel Flatten Beirut to Destroy Hezbollah's Missiles?" Lebanese journalist and human rights researcher Kareen Chehayeb called it "ludicrous" that a prominent American professor "can just calmly say the solution is to flatten this entire city of 1 million people."

== Personal life ==
After graduating with his PhD, Etzioni then remained in the United States to pursue a career as an academic and public intellectual. He became an American citizen in 1963, shortly after he was elected to the board of Americans for Democratic Action. Etzioni met a fellow student named Hava Horowitz while studying sociology in Israel. They married in 1953. Etzioni and Hava relocated to the United States in 1957. They had two sons together: Ethan (born 1958) and Oren (born 1964). In 1964, Hava and Etzioni divorced and she returned to Israel. In his autobiography, Etzioni wrote that the divorce was one of his "gravest personal failures. We should have found a way."

In 1966, Etzioni married Mexican scholar Minerva Morales. They had three sons: Michael, David, and Benjamin. Morales was raised Catholic, but converted to Judaism, Etzioni's religion. On 20 December 1985, Minerva was killed in a car crash. Etzioni wrote of his considerable grief over her death and that of his son Michael, who died of a heart attack in 2006, leaving behind a pregnant wife and a son. In 1992, Etzioni married Patricia Kellogg.

Etzioni provided a personal account of his work and life in a memoir called My Brother's Keeper. He augmented this account with an essay about losing his public voice called "My Kingdom for a Wave." He revealed his early childhood experiences to be the source of his feelings against war and aggression in a short video, called "The Making of a Peacenik."

Etzioni lived at the Watergate complex in Washington, D.C., where he died on 31 May 2023, at the age of 94.

== Bibliography ==
- Coughlin, Richard M. (4 June 2009). "Amitai Etzioni". American Sociological Association.
- De Carvalho, David (December 1995). "The challenge of community: Review of New Communitarian Thinking". Quadrant. 39 (12): 80–82.
- Tam, Henry (1998). Communitarianism: A New Agenda for Politics and Citizenship. New York: New York University Press. ISBN 978-0-8147-8236-1.
- Frazer, Elizabeth (1999). The Problems of Communitarian Politics: Unity and Conflict. Oxford [England]; New York: Oxford University Press. ISBN 978-0-19-152252-9.
- Jennings, Lane (November 2001). "Who's Afraid of a Moral Society?". Futurist. 35 (6): 52–53.
- Reese-Schäfer, Walter (2001). Amitai Etzioni zur Einführung. Hamburg: Junius Verlag. ISBN 978-3-88506-342-1.
- Prideaux, Simon (2002). "From Organisational Theory to the New Communitarianism of Amitai Etzioni". Canadian Journal of Sociology. 27 (1): 69–81. doi:10.2307/3341413. hdl:1961/1407. JSTOR 3341413.
- Marks, Jonathan (2005). "Moral Dialogue in the Thought of Amitai Etzioni". Good Society Journal. 14 (1/2): 15–18. doi:10.1353/gso.2005.0034. S2CID 145096193.
- Boykoff, Jules (2006). "How Patriotic is the Patriot Act?: Freedom Versus Security in the Age of Terrorism - Amitai Etzioni". Journal of Politics. 68 (2): 470–471. doi:10.1111/j.1468-2508.2006.00420_6.x.
- McWilliams, Wilson Carey, ed. (2006). The Active Society Revisited. Lanham, MD: Rowman & Littlefield. ISBN 978-0-7425-4915-9.
- "Euthanasia". ProCon.org. Archived from the original on 9 June 2017.
- Satin, Mark Ivor, ed. (2007). Radical Middle: The Politics We Need Now. Boulder, CO: Westview Press. ISBN 978-0-8133-4190-3.
- Sciulli, David (2011). Etzioni's Critical Functionalism: Communitarian Origins and Principles. Leiden; Boston: Brill. ISBN 978-90-04-19043-6.
- Gvosdev, Nikolas (2016). Communitarian Foreign Policy: Amitai Etzioni's Vision. New Brunswick, NJ: Transaction Publishers. ISBN 978-1-4128-6260-8.

=== Books ===
- A Comparative Analysis of Complex Organizations. Glencoe, IL: Free Press. 1961. ISBN 978-0-02-909620-8.
- The Hard Way to Peace: A New Strategy. New York: Collier. 1962.
- Winning without War. Garden City, NY: Doubleday. 1964.
- Modern Organizations. Englewood Cliffs, NJ: Prentice-Hall. 1964. ISBN 978-0-13-596049-3.
- The Moon-Doggle: Domestic and International Implications of the Space Race. Garden City, NY: Doubleday. 1964.
- Political Unification: A Comparative Study of Leaders and Forces. New York: Holt, Rinehart and Winston. 1965.
- Studies in Social Change. New York: Holt, Rinehart and Winston. 1966.
- The Active Society: A Theory of Societal and Political Processes. New York: Free Press. 1968.
- Demonstration Democracy. New York: Gordon & Breach. 1971. ISBN 978-0-02-909580-5.
- Genetic Fix: The Next Technological Revolution. New York: Macmillan Publishing Co., Inc. 1973. ISBN 978-1-135-36371-0.
- Social Problems. Englewood Cliffs, NJ: Prentice-Hall. 1976.
- An Immodest Agenda: Rebuilding America Before the 21st Century. New York: McGraw-Hill Co. 1983.
- Capital Corruption: The New Attack on American Democracy. New York: Harcourt Brace Jovanovich. 1984. ISBN 978-0-88738-708-1.
- The Moral Dimension: Toward a New Economics. New York: The Free Press. 1988. ISBN 978-0-02-909901-8.
- A Responsive Society: Collected Essays on Guiding Deliberate Social Change. San Francisco: Jossey-Bass Publishers. 1991. ISBN 978-1-55542-378-0.
- The Spirit of Community: Rights, Responsibilities and the Communitarian Agenda. New York: Crown Publishers, Inc. 1993. ISBN 978-0-671-88524-3.
- Public Policy in a New Key. New Brunswick, NJ: Transaction Publishers. 1993. ISBN 978-1-56000-075-4.
- The New Golden Rule: Community and Morality in a Democratic Society. New York: Basic Books. 1997. ISBN 978-0-465-04999-8.
- Essays in Socio-Economics. Germany: Springer. 1999. ISBN 978-3-540-64466-8.
- The Limits of Privacy. New York: Basic Books. 1999. ISBN 978-0-465-04090-2.
- Martin Buber und die Kommunitarische Idee. Vienna, Austria: Picus Verlag. 1999. ISBN 978-3-85452-372-7.
- The Third Way to a Good Society. Pamphlet. London: Demos. 2000. ISBN 978-1-84180-030-1.
- Next: The Road to the Good Society. New York: Basic Books. 2001.
- Political Unification Revisited: On Building Supranational Communities. Lanham, MD: Lexington Books. 2001. ISBN 978-0-7391-0273-2.
- The Monochrome Society. Princeton: Princeton University Press. 2001. ISBN 978-0-691-11457-6.
- My Brother's Keeper: A Memoir and a Message. Rowman & Littlefield: Lanham, MD. 2003. ISBN 978-0-7425-2158-2.
- From Empire to Community: A New Approach to International Relations. New York: Palgrave Macmillan. 2004. ISBN 978-1-4039-6535-6.
- The Common Good. Cambridge, MA: Polity Press. 2004. ISBN 978-0-7456-3267-4.
- How Patriotic is the Patriot Act?: Freedom Versus Security in the Age of Terrorism. New York: Routledge. 2004. ISBN 978-0-415-95047-3.
- Security First: For a Muscular, Moral Foreign Policy. New Haven: Yale University Press. 2007. ISBN 978-0-300-13804-7.
- New Common Ground: A New America, A New World. Washington, DC: Potomac Publishing, 2009. ISBN 978-1-59797-407-3.
- Law in a New Key: Essays on Law and Society. New Orleans, LA: Quid Pro Quo Books. 2010. ISBN 978-1-61027-044-1.
- Hot Spots: American Foreign Policy in a Post-Human-Rights World. New Brunswick, NJ: Transaction Publishers. 2012. ISBN 978-1-4128-5546-4.
- The New Normal: Finding a Balance between Individual Rights and the Common Good. New Brunswick, NJ: Transaction Publishers. 2015. ISBN 978-1-4128-5526-6.
- Privacy in a Cyber Age: Policy and Practice. New York: Palgrave Macmillan. 2015. ISBN 978-1-137-51358-8.
- Foreign Policy: Thinking Outside the Box. New York: Routledge. 2016. ISBN 978-1-138-67830-9.
- Avoiding War with China: Two Nations, One World. Charlottesville, VA: University of Virginia Press. 2017. ISBN 978-0-8139-4003-8.
- Happiness is the Wrong Metric: A Liberal Communitarian Response to Populism. Washington, DC. Springer. 2018. ISBN 978-3-319-69623-2.
- Law and Society in a Populist Age: Balancing Individual Rights and the Common Good. Bristol: Bristol University Press. 2018. ISBN 978-1-5292-0025-6.
- Reclaiming Patriotism. Charlottesville, VA: University of Virginia Press. 2019.

Books edited and/or co-authored by Etzioni are not included in this list.

== Awards ==
- 1960–1961: Fellowship at the Social Science Research Council
- 1965–1966: Fellowship at the Center for Advanced Study in the Behavioral Sciences
- 1968–1969: Guggenheim Fellowship
- 1978–present: Appointment as a Fellow of the American Association for the Advancement of Science
- 1987: The Lester F. Ward Distinguished Contributions Award in Applied Sociology
- 1991: The Ninth Annual Jeffrey Pressman Award (Policy Studies Association)
- 2001: John P. McGovern Award in Behavioral Sciences
- 2001: Officer's Cross of the Order of Merit of the Federal Republic of Germany
- Recipient of the Seventh James Wilbur Award for Extraordinary Contributions to the Appreciation and Advancement of Human Values by the Conference on Value Inquiry
- Recipient of the Sociological Practice Association's Outstanding Contribution Award
- 2016: Officially became a member of the National Academy of Medicine.
- Honorary degrees from Rider College (1980); Governors State University (1987); the University of Utah (1991); Colorado College (1994); Connecticut College (1994); Walden University (1997); Franklin Pierce College (2004); and the University of Cologne (2009).
