= Why Liberalism Failed =

2018 book by Patrick Deneen

- First edition
- Author: Patrick Deneen
- Language: English
- Subject: 20th-century history, political philosophy, liberalism
- Published: January 2018
- Publisher: Yale University Press
- Pages: 248
- ISBN: 978-0300223446

Why Liberalism Failed is a 2018 book by Patrick Deneen, a professor of political science at the University of Notre Dame. It criticizes both forms of American liberalism: "classical liberalism", typically called "libertarianism" in America, and "progressive/modern liberalism", often called simply "liberalism".

== Synopsis ==
Why Liberalism Failed is a critique of political, social, and economic liberalism as practiced by both American Democrats and Republicans. According to Deneen, "we should rightly wonder whether America is not in the early days of its eternal life but rather approaching the end of the natural cycle of corruption and decay that limits the lifespan of all human creations." The book argues that liberalism has exhausted itself, leading to income inequality, cultural decline, atomization, nihilism, the erosion of freedoms, and the growth of powerful, centralized bureaucracies. The book also argues that liberalism has replaced old values of community, religion and tradition with self-interest.

== Reviews ==
Former US president Barack Obama wrote in 2018 that while he disagrees with many of the conclusions of the book, Why Liberalism Failed "offers cogent insights into the loss of meaning and community that many in the West feel, issues that liberal democracies ignore at their own peril."

Jennifer Szalai for The New York Times wrote that it "speaks to a profound discontent with the political establishment" and that Deneen echoes the popular 2016 election sentiment that both parties were the same. She adds that the book attributes liberalism not only to one side but mostly to political elites' orthodoxy dating to 500 years ago. She describes the book as "a deeply exasperating volume that nevertheless articulates something important in this age of disillusionment." Deneen proposes a more traditional society in which "preferably religious communities tend to the land and look after their own," and is critical of women's liberation that pushed them into capitalism.

In a review for The New York Review of Books, Robert Kuttner described the book as "convenient for conservatives looking to blame all ills on liberals" to oppose globalization and market fundamentalism and to perceive liberalism as "a dangerous betrayal of deeper sources of culture and civilization such as the family, the tribe, the nation, and the church," Kuttner also argued that Deneen engaged in "exaggerations, omissions, and misrepresentations of liberalism" and added that "the acclaim his book initially received is startling, even scandalous."

In its review of the book, The Economist argued that Deneen "does an impressive job of capturing the current mood of disillusionment, echoing left-wing complaints about rampant commercialism, right-wing complaints about narcissistic and bullying students, and general worries about atomisation and selfishness" but criticized him for failing to actually convince that the only way to solve the problem is abandoning liberalism. The magazine concludes that "the best way to read Why Liberalism Failed is not as a funeral oration but as a call to action: up your game, or else."

Writing in The Week, Damon Linker described it as "the most electrifying book of cultural criticism published in some time." He added that Deneen argues that liberalism failed because it succeeded. But Linker wrote that he did not find "especially persuasive" the claim made in the book that the Western liberal world was nearing its end.

Park MacDougald wrote for New York that Deneen criticizes liberalism not because of its materialist failures but from a philosophical standpoint and for "what he sees as a liberal redefinition of the ancient and medieval concept of freedom, or libertas." "Liberalism's big innovation was to reject this classical understanding as unrealistic, unscientific, and oppressive," writes MacDougald. He concludes that "Why Liberalism Failed is a polemic, if an elegantly argued one, and it contains some of the drawbacks of the genre."

The paleoconservative Paul Gottfried wrote in The Independent Review that, while he agrees with much of the criticism of liberalism, he also finds several idiosyncrasies in the book, describing it as "an anti-modernist Catholic polemic that has elicited praise and support from unexpected admirers."

Writing for the National Review, Christian Alejandro Gonzalez was critical of the book, arguing that "Deneen's critique of liberalism exhibits an undue nostalgia for the past and ingratitude for the virtues of the present." He added that the book "combines Marxist economic protestations with social-conservative moral sensibilities to produce a critique of the classical liberal project."

Writing for Newsweek, Jonah Goldberg agreed with Deneen: "There are a myriad downsides to radical individualism. America's troubles today are inextricably linked with the breakdown of the family, local institutions, communities, organized religion and social trust." However, Goldberg concluded, "An illiberal order that allows people to say and think what they want, innovators to create what they want and citizens to maintain loyalties to things other than the perpetuation of the regime is an oxymoron. Which is why I would rather live in a society that often fails to live up to its Liberal ideals than in one that succeeds in forcing me to bow down to illiberal ones."

In a review for The Washington Times, Aram Bakshian wrote that the book "lucidly explains how liberalism has trapped itself in its own labyrinth" but fails to offer a credible alternative to it. Bakshian is particularly critical of Deneen's propositions for a new post-liberal society. Bakshian argues that such vision "totters on the edge of New Age absurdity" and compares them to Jean-Jacques Rousseau's ideal of the "noble savage."

Writing for Jacobin, Lyle Jeremy Rubin said that the book is "a bold, seasonable, and at times, welcome estimation of the liberal status quo — yet one that nonetheless suffers from the significant blind spots and prejudices of its author." He argued that the book's "anticapitalist conservatism" comes "far short of liberation."

The conservative political journal American Affairs has published commentaries on the book by Polish philosopher Ryszard Legutko and Harvard University law professor Adrian Vermeule.

Jackson Lears and Cornel West have praised the book.
