= Mehrsa Baradaran =

American law professor (born 1978)

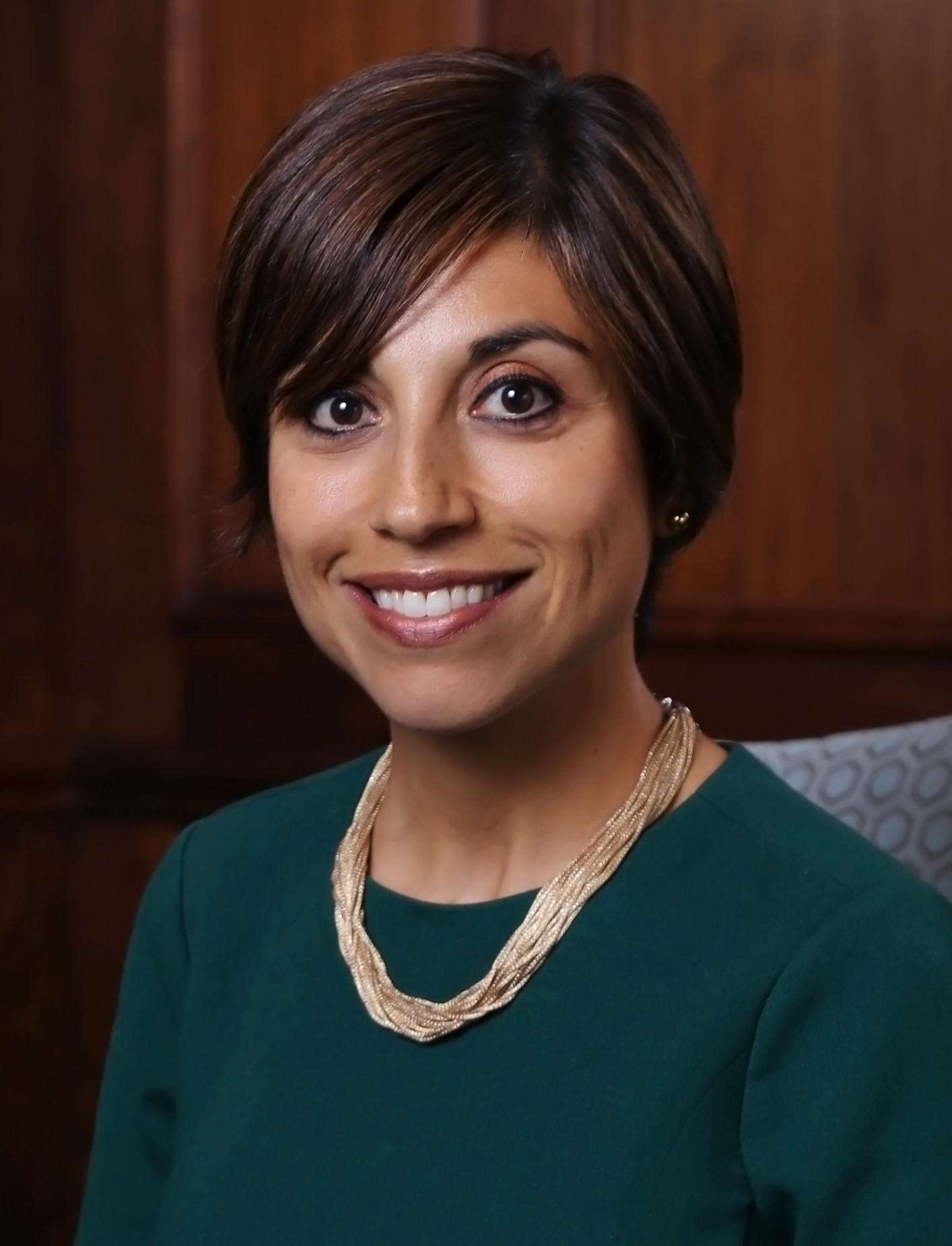
- Born: April 3, 1978 (age 48); Orumieh, Imperial State of Iran
- Education: Brigham Young University (BA); New York University (JD)
- Employer: University of California, Irvine School of Law
- Notable work: How the Other Half Banks: Exclusion, Exploitation, and the Threat to Democracy; The Color of Money: Black Banks and the Racial Wealth Gap

Mehrsa Baradaran (born April 3, 1978) is an Iranian-American legal scholar known for her studies of banking law. She is a professor of law at the University of California, Irvine. Baradaran is a noted proponent of postal banking to expand financial services to underserved communities. Baradaran has also stated that postal banking will not be enough to close the racial wealth gap and more recently, has proposed the necessity of a "Black New Deal."

== Early life and education ==
Baradaran was born on April 3, 1978, in Orumieh, Iran. Her mother spent several years as a political prisoner in Iran. Baradaran and her family immigrated to the United States in 1986, settling in Los Angeles. She and her younger sister Shima did not speak English when they began elementary school, but learned the language within three months. Baradaran and her family also converted from Islam and joined The Church of Jesus Christ of Latter-day Saints.

Baradaran graduated from Brigham Young University in 2002 with a Bachelor of Arts, magna cum laude, in English literature. She then attended the New York University School of Law, where she was an editor of the New York University Law Review and graduated in 2005 with a Juris Doctor, cum laude. Baradaran spent 18 months giving service to Latino immigrants in Houston, which led to her becoming fluent in Spanish.

== Legal career ==
After law school, Baradaran was in private practice in New York City in the financial institutions group of the law firm Davis, Polk & Wardwell. She was an academic fellow at the NYU School of Law from 2009 to 2010, then became a professor at Brigham Young University's J. Reuben Clark Law School.

In 2012, Baradaran joined the law faculty at the University of Georgia School of Law in 2012, where she was the J. Alton Hosch Associate Professor, teaching contracts and banking law. At the University of California, Irvine (UCI) School of Law, she has taught courses such as "Banking Law, Property, Race, Law & Capitalism" that explore the intersection of racism, inequality, and the law.

== Political activity ==
In November 2020, Baradaran was named a volunteer member of the Joe Biden presidential transition's Agency Review Team to support transition efforts related to the Department of Treasury and the Federal Reserve.

In 2021, Baradaran was mentioned as a possible contender for the position of Comptroller of the Currency. Baradaran's nomination was supported by progressives in the Democratic Party, including Representative Jamaal Bowman. In the end, Cornell Law Professor Saule Omarova was chosen for the role instead. Since then, she has been mentioned as a possible candidate to serve on the Federal Reserve.

== Personal life and recognition ==
Baradaran spoke about her experience as a refugee from Iran in Slate in January 2017. She pointed out that she was one of the "immigrants and refugees from 'terrorist countries' that soon will be banned by executive order from coming [to America]". She concluded:

"The irony for me is that it was Iran's tribalism and nationalism that put my family out in the first place. Ayatollah Ruhollah Khomeini's regime had said 'Iran First', too. They silenced the press, kicked out all the 'others', and ran the liberal intellectuals out of the country. I hope that's not what happens here. But even if it does, this is my home and I will keep working to make America great because I have so much hope in America".

== Bibliography ==
Baradaran's first book, How the Other Half Banks: Exclusion, Exploitation, and the Threat to Democracy, was published in 2015. In the book, she proposes postal banking, an idea that was endorsed by Bernie Sanders and Elizabeth Warren. On October 15, 2015, Baradaran gave a speech on the book to the American Postal Workers Union and the National Association of Letter Carriers, where she again proposed a return to postal banking, which was discontinued in 1967. The book has been featured in a number of publications, including the New York Times, The Atlantic, the Financial Times.

In 2017, Baradaran published her second book, The Color of Money: Black Banking and the Racial Wealth Gap, the Harvard University Press. The book, which explores how a racially-segregated financial system built and maintained the racial wealth gap, inspired Netflix to commit $100 million to support Black communities.

Baradaran's third book, The Quiet Coup: Neoliberalism and the Looting of America was published in 2024. In a starred review, Kirkus called it "essential reading to understand the state of the nation."

Baradaran's fourth book, The Racial Wealth Gap: A Brief History, was published in 2026.
