= Pluralist democracy =

Democracy with more than one system of power

A pluralist democracy is a political system where there is more than one center of power.

Modern democracies are by definition pluralist as they allow freedom of association; however, pluralism may exist without democracy.

In a pluralist democracy, individuals achieve positions of formal political authority by forming successful electoral coalitions.

Such coalitions are formed through a process of bargaining among political leaders and subleaders of the various organizations within the community. It is necessary to form electoral coalitions; this gives the organizational leaders the ability to present demands and articulate the viewpoints of their membership. Hamed Kazemzadeh, a pluralist from Canada, believes that pluralist democracy means a multitude of groups, not the people as a whole, can govern, direct, and manage societies as an ethic of respect for diversity.

== See also ==
- Value pluralism
