= Postliberalism =

Political philosophy

Postliberalism is a political philosophy which rejects liberal views on market economics, globalization, and individualist views on society. Postliberalism instead posits a communitarian worldview that promotes social solidarity, fraternal relations, and economic reciprocity. Postliberalism has adherents on both the political left and right.

Patrick Deneen's 2023 book Regime Change: Toward a Postliberal Future argues that liberalism should be replaced with a form of postliberal conservatism that strives for the "common good". Deneen describes the postliberal future as a mixed regime that rejects democratic pluralism and an "invasive progressive tyranny". He advocates a return to "traditional" views on marriage, family and sexual identity along with a renewal of Christianity. He describes this as brought about by a "self-conscious aristoi" dispensing with liberal notions of freedom and equality and advancing aristopopulism. He advocates for the "blending" of a conservative elite over a non-liberal populace until it becomes "one thing", to be achieved through the "raw assertion of political power".

== People ==
=== Intellectual sources ===
- John Gray
- John Milbank
- Giles Fraser
- Patrick Deneen
- Danny Kruger
- Sohrab Ahmari
- Adrian Vermeule
- Jeremy Christiansen
- Adrian Pabst

=== Politicians ===
- JD Vance
