= Patrick Deneen =

American political theorist (born 1964)

- Born: July 21, 1964 (age 62)
- Spouse: Inge Deneen

Academic background
- Education: Rutgers University, New Brunswick (BA, PhD); University of Chicago
- Thesis: The Odyssey of Political Theory (1995)
- Doctoral advisor: Wilson Carey McWilliams
- Other advisor: Benjamin Barber
- Influences: Wendell Berry; Christopher Lasch; Alexis de Tocqueville

Academic work
- Discipline: Political science
- Sub-discipline: Constitutional studies; political theory
- School or tradition: Communitarianism; conservatism; participatory democracy; postliberalism; Roman Catholicism
- Institutions: Princeton University; Georgetown University; University of Notre Dame
- Notable works: Why Liberalism Failed (2018)
- Website: patrickjdeneen.com

Patrick J. Deneen (born July 21, 1964) is an American political theorist and author, known for his critical examination of liberalism and its effect on contemporary society. He is a professor of political science at the University of Notre Dame, where his work emphasizes the interrelations of political philosophy, culture, and religion.

Deneen's most notable book, Why Liberalism Failed, argues that the principles of liberalism have caused societal fragmentation and the erosion of communal bonds. His scholarship often explores the philosophical underpinnings of modern political thought and advocates for more traditional and localized forms of governance. His 2023 book, Regime Change: Toward a Postliberal Future, extends his critique of liberalism and develops a broader view of a postliberal politics.

== Life and career ==
Patrick J. Deneen was born on July 21, 1964, the son of an insurance executive. He grew up in a Catholic household in Windsor, Connecticut. Deneen is of Irish ancestry. Deneen was educated at Rutgers University, earning a BA in English literature in 1986. He began his doctoral work in political science at the University of Chicago's Committee on Social Thought, studying there for one year before returning to Rutgers in 1995. His dissertation, "The Odyssey of Political Theory", was awarded the 1995 American Political Science Association Leo Strauss Award for Best Dissertation in Political Philosophy.

From 1995 to 1997, Deneen was a speechwriter and special advisor to Joseph Duffey, the director of the United States Information Agency, appointed by President Clinton.

Deneen taught at Princeton University from 1997 to 2005 as an assistant professor. Deneen joined the faculty at Georgetown University in 2005 and was the Tsakopoulos-Kounalakis Associate Professor of Government until 2012. Deneen was founding director of the Tocqueville Forum on the Roots of American Democracy housed in the Government Department at Georgetown University from 2006 to 2012. The Tocqueville Forum was founded in 2006 "to promote civic knowledge and promote inquiry".

Deneen joined the faculty at Notre Dame in 2012, and was promoted to full professor in 2018.

=== Written work and influence ===
Deneen is a scholar of democracy, liberalism, classical and modern political thought, and American political thought. He has been considered as being among prominent conservative intellectuals, particularly for his argument that liberalism—in both its modern and Enlightenment expressions—has failed America.

He is the author of five monographs, co-editor of three volumes, and author of numerous academic articles. He has written for publications such as First Things, The American Conservative, The New Atlantis, and Front Porch Republic. Deneen's 2018 book Why Liberalism Failed was recommended by former President Barack Obama as part of his summer reading list. Obama wrote that "I found [Why Liberalism Failed] thought-provoking. I don’t agree with most of the author’s conclusions, but the book offers cogent insights into the loss of meaning and community that many in the West feel, issues that liberal democracies ignore at their own peril."

Deneen's 2023 book Regime Change: Toward a Postliberal Future discusses how liberalism can be replaced with a form of post-liberal conservatism that strives for the "common good". Deneen describes the postliberal future as a mixed regime that rejects democratic pluralism and an "invasive progressive tyranny". He advocates a return to "traditional" views on marriage, family and sexual identity along with a renewal of Christianity. He describes this as brought about by a "self-conscious aristoi" dispensing with liberal notions of freedom and equality and advancing aristopopulism. He advocates for the "blending" of a conservative elite over a non-liberal populace until it becomes "one thing", to be achieved through the "raw assertion of political power".

Deneen was a founding editor of the internet magazine Front Porch Republic, for which he continues to serve as a contributing editor. The journal drew inspiration from the writings of Wendell Berry, represented by its motto: "Place. Limits. Liberty." Deneen wrote first posting of the website, published March 2, 2009, entitled "A Republic of Front Porches", which was later re-published in revised form in the 2018 book Localism in the Mass Age: A Front Porch Republic Manifesto. David Brooks in 2012 grouped Front Porch Republic with The American Conservative as "paleoconservative" publications influencing the future of conservatism. He described contributors to The American Conservative as "suspicious of bigness: big corporations, big government, a big military, concentrated power and concentrated wealth. Writers at that Web site, and at the temperamentally aligned Front Porch Republic, treasure tight communities and local bonds. They're alert to the ways capitalism can erode community. Dispositionally, they are more Walker Percy than Pat Robertson."

Deneen has cited a number of influences for his form of Catholic communitarianism, including his doctoral advisor Wilson Carey McWilliams, Wendell Berry, Christopher Lasch, and Alexis de Tocqueville.

== Political engagements ==
Deneen was a featured speaker at the 2019 National Conservatism Conference in Washington, DC. In his address, he was in part critical of national conservatism, arguing that American nationalism had been a major objective and achievement of progressives such as Woodrow Wilson, Theodore Roosevelt, and Herbert Croly. He endorsed a nation that promoted more local forms of association: "The nation should be above all devoted to efforts to sustain, foster and support the communities that comprise it, and to combat, where necessary and possible, the modern forces that have proven to be so destructive of those constitutive communities."

In September 2019 Deneen lectured on "The Crisis of Democracy" in the Senate of the Czech Republic as part of an international conference arranged by the voting reform group Institute H21. In November 2019, Deneen met Hungarian Prime Minister Viktor Orbán as part of a visit to Budapest to discuss the Hungarian translation of Why Liberalism Failed in the Hungarian Academy of Sciences.

In June 2020, Deneen responded to charges by libertarians of a lack of loyalty to American liberal founding principles. Accused of hostility to the individualism of American founding principles by George Will, he pointed to a non-liberal, more communitarian strand in the American tradition.

In July 2020, Deneen engaged in two public debates with libertarian conservatives. At the website The American Compass, Deneen debated with former CKE Restaurants CEO Andrew Puzder on the social responsibilities of corporations, in which Deneen argued for greater civic, consumer, and environmental corporate responsibility. He also debated conservative columnist Jonah Goldberg on the consequences of liberalism, arguing that liberalism had increased social isolation, political fragmentation, and economic inequality.

In November 2020, he joined the American Solidarity Party Board of Advisors.

== Works ==
External videos
- Naval Academy Discussion on Liberalism's Past and Present
- Regime Change

- Deneen, Patrick J. (2000). The Odyssey of Political Theory. Lanham, United States: Rowman & Littlefield. ISBN 978-0-8476-9622-2.
- Deneen, Patrick J. (2005). Democratic Faith. Princeton, United States: Princeton University Press. ISBN 9780691118710.
- Deneen, Patrick J. (2016). Conserving America? Essays on Present Discontents. South Bend, United States: St Augustine's Press. ISBN 9781587319150.
- Deneen, Patrick J. (2018). Why Liberalism Failed. New Haven, United States: Yale University Press. ISBN 9780300223446.
- Deneen, Patrick J. (2023). Regime Change: Toward a Postliberal Future. New York City: Sentinel. ISBN 9780593086902.
