= Daniel Gordis =

American-born Israeli author and speaker (born 1959)

- דניאל גורדיס
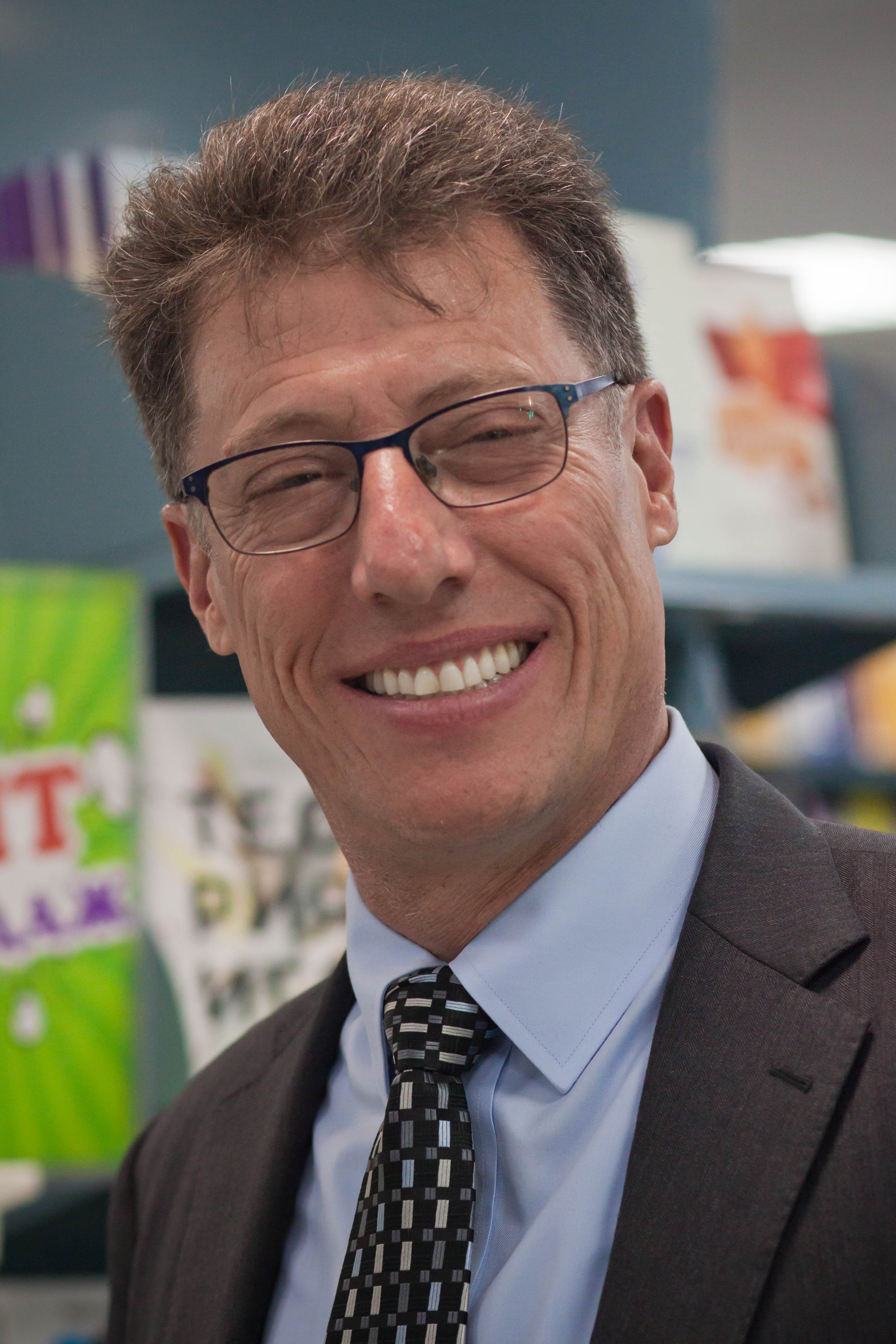
- Daniel Gordis, 2018
- Born: July 5, 1959 (age 67); New York City, New York, U.S.
- Education: Columbia University (BA); Jewish Theological Seminary of America (MA); University of Southern California (PhD)
- Occupation: Author
- Employer: Shalem College
- Father: Leon Gordis
- Relatives: Robert Gordis (grandfather)
- Awards: National Jewish Book Award (2009, 2016)

Daniel Gordis (Hebrew: דניאל גורדיס; born 1959) is an American-born Israeli author. He is Koret Distinguished Fellow at Shalem College in Jerusalem, where he previously was Senior Vice President and Chair of the Core Curriculum.

Gordis is the author of a dozen books on Judaism and Israel. He has received the National Jewish Book Award twice, including Book of the Year for Israel: A Concise History Of A Nation Reborn. The Forward has called Gordis "one of the most influential Israel analysts around."

== Biography ==
Gordis was born on July 5, 1959, in New York City, and was raised in Baltimore where he attended public high school. His father was Leon Gordis, an epidemiologist at the Johns Hopkins School of Hygiene and Public Health. His mother, Hadassah Gordis, was a clinical social worker. His grandfather was Rabbi Robert Gordis, a noted biblical scholar and one of the leaders of the Conservative Movement. His uncle (his mother's brother) was Professor Gerson D. Cohen, who served as Chancellor of the Jewish Theological Seminary. Gordis himself was once recognized as a leading Conservative rabbi, but is no longer publicly associated with that movement.

== Academic career ==
Gordis earned a bachelor's degree from Columbia University in 1981. He then received a master's degree and rabbinic ordination from the Jewish Theological Seminary of America. Gordis and his wife moved to California in 1984, and while there, he received his Ph.D. from the University of Southern California. He immigrated to Israel in 1998.

Gordis was the founding dean of the Ziegler School of Rabbinic Studies at the University of Judaism, the first rabbinical school on the West Coast of the United States.

From 1998 to 2007, he worked at the Mandel Foundation and the Mandel Leadership Institute in Jerusalem. He joined the Shalem Center in 2007 as Senior Vice President and Koret Distinguished Fellow at Shalem College.

In 2007, after nine years as vice president of the Mandel Foundation and director of its Leadership Institute, Gordis joined the Shalem Center to join the team founding Israel's first liberal arts college.

== Writing career ==
Gordis has written for The New York Times, The New Republic, The New York Times Magazine, Moment, Tikkun, the Jerusalem Post, Haaretz and Conservative Judaism. He was a regular columnist for the Jerusalem Post, for which he wrote a regular column called "A Dose of Nuance" until 2019, and for Bloomberg View until 2021. Gordis has been publishing his own column about five times a week via Substack, called Israel from the Inside, since May 2021. The publication states that "Israel from the Inside is meant to understand the soul of Israel."

In 2016, Gordis won the Jewish Book of the Year from the Jewish Book Council for Israel: A Concise History Of A Nation Reborn.

== Positions ==
Gordis has been harshly critical of American Jews who criticize Israeli government policies, sometimes publicly accusing them of either betraying Israel and the Jewish people (as in the case of Rabbi Sharon Brous), having insufficient love for Israel (Rabbi Jill Jacobs) or being a traitor to the Jewish people (Peter Beinart). He has also extended this assessment to rabbinical seminaries and their students.

== Published works ==
=== Books ===
- God Was Not in the Fire: The Search for a Spiritual Judaism (Scribner, 1995)
- Does the World Need the Jews: Rethinking Chosenness and American Jewish Identity (Scribner, 1997)
- Becoming a Jewish Parent: How to Explore Spirituality and Tradition with Your Children (Random House, 1999)
- If a Place Can Make You Cry (Crown, 2002)
- Home to Stay: One American Family’s Chronicle of Miracles and Struggles in Contemporary Israel (Random House, 2003)
- Coming Together, Coming Apart (Wiley, 2006)
- Saving Israel: How the Jewish People Can Win a War That May Never End (Wiley, 2009)

The book won the 2008 National Jewish Book Award under the Contemporary Jewish Life and Practice category.

- Pledges of Jewish Allegiance: Conversion, Law, and Policymaking in Nineteenth- and Twentieth-Century Orthodox Responsa (Stanford U Press, 2012)
- The Promise of Israel: Why Its Seemingly Greatest Weakness Is Actually Its Greatest Strength (Wiley, 2012)
- Menachem Begin and the Battle for Israel's Soul (Nextbook, 2014)

The book has been called by UK-based freelance writer and critic Stephen Daisely "the gold standard text in Begin studies". Critics beg to disagree, such as Samuel Thrope who writes "The book is a paragon of overweening pride: smug, self-satisfied, convinced of its own conclusions, and disdainful of its presumed critics" and that the "black-and-white picture of [Ben-Gurion and Begin] is a caricature that does not do justice to either figure."

- Israel: A Concise History of a Nation Reborn (Ecco/Harper Collins, 2016)
- We Stand Divided (Ecco, 2019)
- Impossible Takes Longer: 75 Years After Its Creation, Has Israel Fulfilled Its Founders' Dreams? (Ecco, 2023)

=== Articles ===
- 'E-mail from an Anxious State,' in The New York Times Magazine, September 30, 2001, pp. 42–47. E-mail from an Anxious State
- 'Needing Israel,' in The New York Times, Op-Ed Page, April 13, 2002, page A17. Needing Israel Subsequently entered into the Congressional Record by Representative Anthony Weiner (D-NY) on April 17, 2002, Volume 148, No. 43, pp. H1401-1403.
- 'Taking Risks After the Gaza War,' on the New York Times On-Line Opinion Section, January 12, 2009, Taking Risks After the Gaza War
- He's a Religious Leader, Not a Diplomat
- Forcing Clarity on Israel
- 'The Tower of Babel and the Birth of Nationhood,' in Azure 40 (Spring 2010)]
- 'The Shape and Meaning of Biblical History,' in Azure 45 (Summer 2011)]

=== Films ===
Gordis participated in the documentary film Indestructible about a man suffering from amyotrophic lateral sclerosis, in which he discussed theological explanations for human suffering.
