= Hazony =

Hazony is a surname. Notable people with the surname include:

- David Hazony (born 1969), American-born Israeli writer, translator, and editor
- Yoram Hazony (born 1964), Israeli-American philosopher, Bible scholar, and political theorist
