= Ofir Haivry =

Israeli political philosopher and historian

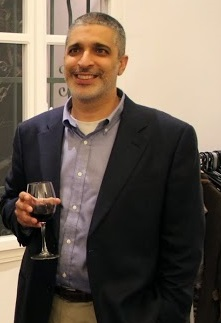

Ofir Haivry (Hebrew: אופיר העברי; born 1964) is an Israeli political philosopher and historian. He is vice president of the Herzl Institute in Jerusalem and leads the Center for Study of The Dispersed of Israel at Yad Ben Zvi.

Haivry is on the boards of the Edmund Burke Foundation and the Working Group for Conservatism in Europe. He was one of the founders of both Shalem Center and Shalem College in Jerusalem. He was founding editor-in-chief of the magazine Azure: Ideas for the Jewish Nation (1996–2012).

== Education and career ==
Haivry holds a BA and MA in history from Tel Aviv University, and a PhD in intellectual history from University College London.

Haivry was one of the founders of the Shalem Center in Jerusalem in 1994, and of Shalem College in 2009. In 1996, he became the founding editor-in-chief of Azure: Ideas for the Jewish Nation.

In 2007 he was awarded the annual fellowship co-sponsored by the Folger Institute and the American Society for Eighteenth-Century Studies.

Haivry's writing has appeared in scholarly and popular publications, and he wrote the book, John Selden and the Western Political Tradition (Cambridge University Press, 2017).

Haivry is currently a member of Israel's Council for Higher Education, Israel's Council for Archeology, and a bilateral steering team to promote academic collaboration between Israel and Italy. He was a member of the 2010, close committee to assess the Israel Prize regulations, and the 2009-2010 steering committee of the TAMAR project to restore Israel’s National Heritage Infrastructure.

== Publications ==
=== Books ===
- John Selden and the Western Political Tradition (Cambridge University Press, 2017)

=== Articles ===
- “Israel in the Eye of the Hurricane” in Mosaic Magazine, January, 2014.
- “Between reason and imagination: Gilliam’s vision and European Nationalism” in J. Birkenstein, The Cinema of Terry Gilliam: It's a Mad World (Columbia University Press, New York, 2013).
- “John Selden and the early modern debate over the foundations of political order” in Annuaire de l’Institut Michel Villey 3/2011 (Paris University Press, 2012) – volume on John Selden.
- “Il declino demografico, un mito duro a morire” in Limes – Rivista Italiana di Geopolitica 5/2011 (Gruppo Editoriale L’Espresso) [Italian]
- “Introduction” first complete Hebrew translation of: A. de Tocqueville, Democracy in America (Shalem Press, Jerusalem, 2008) [Hebrew].
- “On Zion: A Reality That Fashions Imagination” in M. Oren et al. (Eds.) New Essays On Zionism (Shalem Press, Jerusalem, 2006).
