= Paul P. Bernstein =

American businessman and philanthropist (1934–2026)

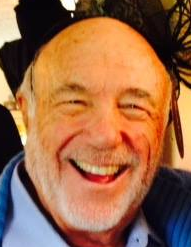
- Born: 1934; Bronx, New York
- Died: May 23, 2026 (aged 91–92)
- Occupation: Investor
- Known for: Co-founder of Sanford C. Bernstein Company
- Family: Zalman Bernstein (brother)

Paul P. Bernstein (1934 – May 23, 2026) was an American businessman and philanthropist.

== Biography ==
Bernstein was born to a Jewish family in 1934 in The Bronx, the son of Jack and Martha Bernstein, who were born and raised in Berlin. His father worked in a jewelry store eventually becoming a minor partner. He went to William Howard Taft High School. He had an older brother Zalman Bernstein. In 1956, he graduated with a bachelor's degree in Economics from New York University where he was a member of the Jewish fraternity Alpha Epsilon Pi. He joined the United States Army after school where he was assigned to Fort Dix and later Fort Benjamin Harrison where he was enrolled in a typing and shorthand school; he avoided going to Korea because he graduated first in his class.

In 1957, his brother secured him a job as a broker with Dreyfus Funds. In 1960, he moved to Oppenheimer Holdings after Dreyfus reduced the commissions and was able to secure a job for his brother. In the 1960s, Zalman left Oppenheimer, eventually starting his own firm with two partners, and soon after hired Bernstein as a salesman. The two partners left after six months for other opportunities, and the firm was renamed Sanford Bernstein. Zalman was able to convince former Oppenheimer associates, Shepard D. Osherow, Roger Hertog, Lewis A. Sanders, and Shelly Lawrence to join his firm.

Sanford C. Bernstein's assets under management grew to over $80 billion from more than 25,000 private and institutional clients. The firm was eventually sold to Alliance Capital Management and is part of what is known as AllianceBernstein today.

== Philanthropy ==
Bernstein was involved in charitable work of various kinds, including Seeds of Peace, The Seeing Eye, and K-9 Companions. Bernstein had a role in the movie Serendipity, and produced a movie and book about Muslims who risked their lives to save Jews during the Holocaust.

== Personal life and death ==
Bernstein most recently lived in Manhattan with his wife. The couple have a daughter. His previous two marriages ended in divorce and he had a daughter Stephanie Brown (died 2004) and son David H. Bernstein.

Bernstein died on May 23, 2026, at the age of 91–92.
