= Roger Hertog =

American businessperson, publisher, philanthropist

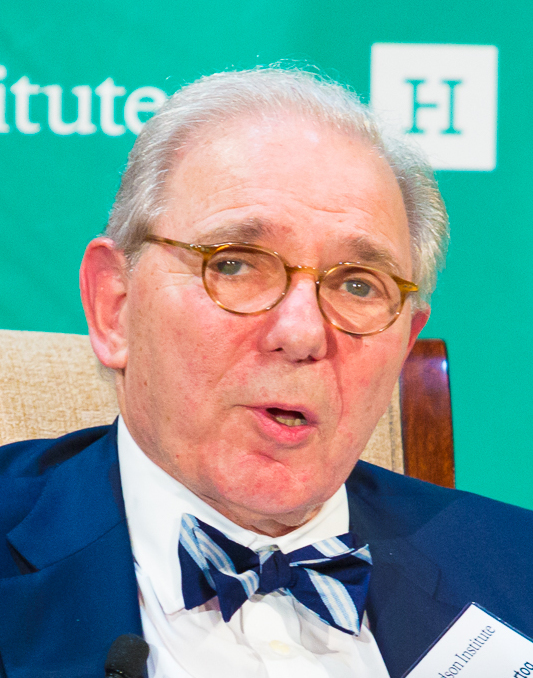
Roger Hertog

Roger Hertog (born July 5, 1941) is an American businessman, financier, and conservative philanthropist. Hertog pursued a career in business, later becoming president of Sanford Bernstein (now AllianceBernstein). He currently serves as president of the Hertog Foundation and chairman of the Tikvah Fund, which promotes Jewish thought and ideas.

== Personal life and career ==
Born to German Jewish immigrants, Hertog was raised in the Bronx and attended public schools. His first job was in the mail room of a financial company while attending City College at night. Eventually, he joined Oppenheimer & Co. in a clerical position. At Oppenheimer, he met his future business partner, Sanford Bernstein. In 1967, Hertog joined Sanford C. Bernstein, & Co. Hertog remained president of the firm until its merger with Alliance Capital Management in 2000. He retired in 2006 from AllianceBernstein L.P. and remains Vice-Chairman Emeritus.

His wife, Susan Hertog, graduated from Hunter College and earned her M.F.A. from Columbia University School of the Arts in 1993. Roger and Susan Hertog have three grown children.

== Philanthropy ==
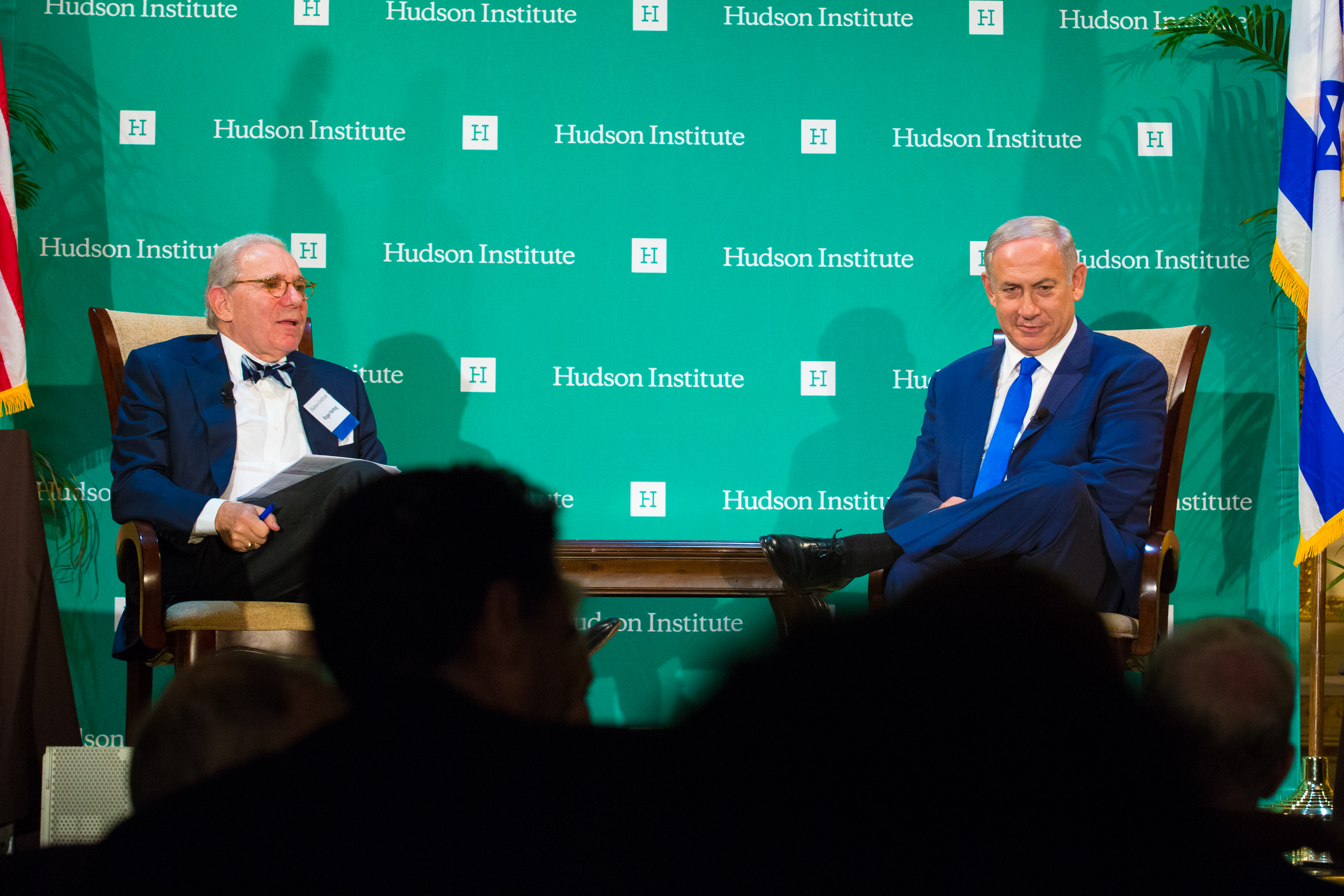
Hertog with Benjamin Netanyahu at Hudson Institute

Hertog is co-president of the Hertog Foundation. He currently serves as the executive committee chairman for the New York Historical Society’s board of directors, and as a board member at the Alexander Hamilton Society. Hertog has spent time on the boards of the American Enterprise Institute, New York Public Library,Thomas Jefferson Foundation, the Washington Institute for Near-East Policy, and is a chairman emeritus of the Manhattan Institute for Policy Research. He was a part-owner of now-defunct The New York Sun and The New Republic, and is a board member at Commentary. He is also a major supporter of National Affairs magazine, edited by Yuval Levin.

His family foundation supports several educational fellowships for college students and young professionals. In 2010, the foundation launched the Political Studies Program, a full-scholarship summer program for undergraduates in the theory and practice of politics. In 2013, in partnership with the Institute for the Study of War, Hertog expanded by launching a two-week summer seminar on warfare and military doctrine for advanced undergraduates, the War Studies Program. The Foundation offers other programs and seminars in three main areas: Political Thought and Philosophy; War and Foreign Affairs; and Economics and Domestic Policy.

Hertog often donates to Jewish and Israeli organizations, and is the chairman of the Tikvah Fund. As part of his work with Tikvah, Hertog helped fund the Shalem Center in Israel, which has since become the Shalem College. Hertog has also given money to the Anti-Defamation League, Taglit-Birthright Israel, and American Friends of Shalva.

Apart from his educational work, Hertog has supported arts and culture in New York City. He is credited with helping spur modernization at the New York Historical Society, joining the board in 2003. In 2004, Hertog and fellow board members Lewis E. Lehrman and Richard Gilder helped fund an Alexander Hamilton exhibit at N-YHS. He sponsored the creation of the Bronx Library Center, which opened in 2006.

In the 1990s, Hertog, along with other investors, launched one of the first privately funded school-voucher programs, funding 1,000 scholarships annually for poor families interested in sending their children to private schools. Over 25,000 applied for the scholarships. He has invested in the Success Charter Network and Families for Excellent Schools in New York, and funded a study on the charter school movement in New York City.

On November 15, 2007, Hertog was awarded a National Humanities Medal in a White House ceremony with U.S. President George W. Bush. He won the William E. Simon Prize for Philanthropic Leadership in 2010.

== See also ==
- List of philanthropists
- List of people from the Bronx
