= Leon Gordis =

American epidemiologist, professor and author

- Born: July 19, 1934; New York City, New York, U.S.
- Died: September 7, 2015 (aged 81); New York City, New York, U.S.
- Education: Columbia University (BA); Jewish Theological Seminary; State University of New York (MD); Johns Hopkins University (MPH, DrPH)
- Occupation: Epidemiologist
- Employer: Johns Hopkins School of Hygiene and Public Health
- Notable work: Epidemiology
- Children: 3, including Daniel Gordis
- Father: Robert Gordis

Leon Gordis (July 19, 1934 – September 7, 2015) was an American epidemiologist, professor and author, whose textbook Epidemiology provided a foundation for the understanding of epidemiologic principles and clinical applications.

== Early life and education ==
The son of Fannie and Robert Gordis, Leon was born in New York City and raised in Far Rockaway, Queens. Robert was a prominent Conservative rabbi and biblical scholar at the Jewish Theological Seminary in New York. Gordis moved to Baltimore in the 1960s after earning degrees from Columbia University and the Jewish Theological Seminary, and a medical degree at the State University of New York Downstate College of Medicine. He earned a master's degree in public health (MPH) in 1966 and a doctorate of public health (DrPH) in 1968 from the Johns Hopkins School of Hygiene and Public Health (later named the Bloomberg School of Public Health). Abraham Lilienfeld, prominent public health pioneer, served as Gordis’ advisor.

== Professional experience ==
Gordis completed his pediatrics training at Hopkins while also a member of the U.S. Public Health Service. He joined the faculty of the Hopkins School of Hygiene and Public Health in 1971, teaching epidemiology. Gordis then became chair of the Department of Epidemiology in 1975, a position he held until 1993.

During his tenure at Hopkins, Gordis designed and taught courses at both the School of Public Health and the Johns Hopkins School of Medicine, where he became Associate Dean for Admissions and Academic Affairs. He also authored Epidemiology, now in its fifth edition, and considered by many as the seminal textbook on epidemiologic principles and clinical practice applications. PowerPoint slides taken directly from the book have been translated for public health students around the world.

He established a cardiovascular fellowship program in 1980 with an institutional grant from the National Heart, Lung, and Blood Institute. More recently, Leon was named a visiting professor at Tel-Aviv University School of Medicine and School of Public Health in 2007. The Welch Center for Prevention, Epidemiology and Clinical Research, which has enriched the schools of public health, medicine and nursing, is in no small part a culmination of Leon’s vision and commitment to collaboration.

Gordis faced controversy from many in the health care industry in the 1990s when he served as chairman of a National Institutes of Health (NIH) expert panel, suggesting that women in their 40s may not require routine mammograms but instead, should weigh the tests' risks and benefits and decide for themselves.

== Personal life ==
Gordis died of a subdural hematoma on September 7, 2015, at Mount Sinai Roosevelt Hospital in New York. His funeral and burial were held the next day in Jerusalem. Gordis and his wife, Hadassah, were long-time residents of Pikesville, Maryland, and in later life, also lived in Israel. They have three sons, eight grandchildren, and two great-grandchildren. His son, Daniel Gordis, is an educator in Israel, serving as vice president of Shalem College.

== Honors and awards ==
- 2007, 2000, 1992, 1988, 1981, 1975 – Golden Apple Awards for Excellence in Teaching, Awarded by Students at the Johns Hopkins Bloomberg School of Public Health
- 1999 – Invited Lecturer, American Epidemiological Society, Harry A. Feldman Lecture
- 1998 – Ernest Lyman Stebbins Medal for outstanding contributions to the teaching programs of the Johns Hopkins School of Hygiene and Public Health
- 1995 – Elected to Phi Beta Kappa
- 1993 – Abraham Lilienfeld Award for Outstanding Contributions to the Teaching of Epidemiology, Awarded by the Epidemiology Section of the American Public Health Association
- 1993 – Teaching Quality Award for Excellence in Teaching, Awarded by the Student Assembly of the Johns Hopkins School of Hygiene and Public Health
- 1989 – Professor’s Award for Excellence in Teaching in the Preclinical Sciences, Johns Hopkins School of Medicine
- 1988 – Certificate for Excellence in Teaching, Awarded by the Students of the Johns Hopkins School of Medicine
- 1988 – Visiting Professor, Department of Community Medicine, St. Thomas’ Hospital, London, England
- 1986, 1984, 1980 – Visiting Professor of Epidemiology, Ben Gurion University, Beer Sheva, Israel
- 1988 – Elected Fellow, American Association for the Advancement of Science
- 1986 – Invited Lecturer, Society for Epidemiologic Research, Annual Scientific Meeting
- 1986 – Elected Member, Institute of Medicine, National Academy of Science
- 1984 – T. Duckett Jones Lecturer at the American Heart Association Annual Scientific Sessions

== Society memberships ==
- 1983-1984 – President, American Epidemiological Society
- 1979-1980 – President, Society for Epidemiologic Research
- Member, American Epidemiological Society
- Member, American Pediatric Society
- Member, Society for Pediatric Research
- Member, American Public Health Association
- Fellow, American Academy of Pediatrics
- Member, Association of Teachers of Preventative Medicine
- Member, American Society for Preventative Oncology
