= Cognitive activism =

Cognitive activism is a type of activism that aims to bring about social change by evolving the way we think about things, often by reframing debates or redefining terms. Frank Luntz and George Lakoff are exemplary cognitive activists, although most activists participate in cognitive activism to some degree.
