= Fania Oz-Salzberger =

Israeli historian & writer (born 1960)

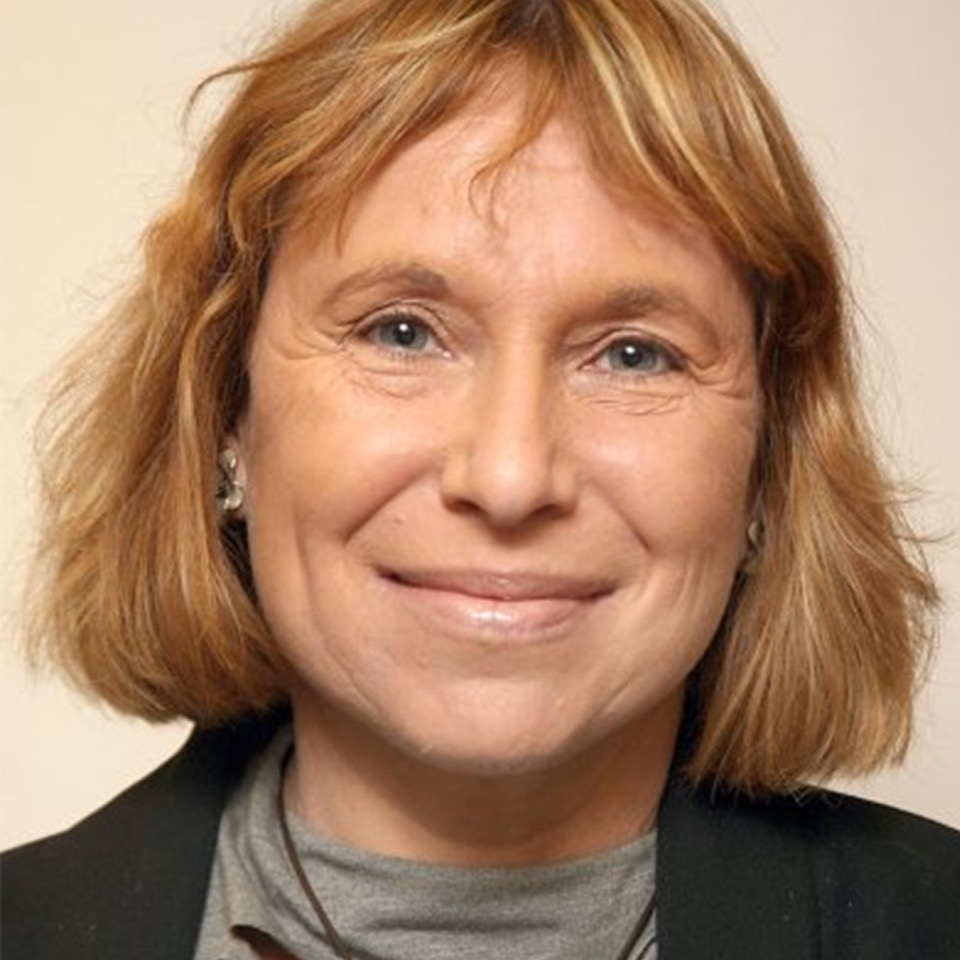
Fania Oz-Salzberger

Fania Oz-Salzberger (Hebrew: פניה עוז-זלצברגר; born 28 October 1960) is an Israeli historian and writer, Professor Emerita of history at the University of Haifa School of Law and the Haifa Center for German and European Studies (HCGES).

== Early life and education ==
Oz-Salzberger was born in 1960 in Kibbutz Hulda, the eldest daughter of writer Amos Oz and his wife Nily. She is the great-great-niece of historian and literary scholar Joseph Klausner. Oz-Salzberger was educated in kibbutz schools and served as an officer in the Israel Defense Forces.

She completed her B.A. in history and philosophy (magna cum laude) and M.A. in modern history (summa cum laude) at Tel Aviv University. Her doctoral thesis, on the Scottish and German Enlightenments (1991), was written at the University of Oxford, supervised by Dr. John Robertson and mentored by philosopher Isaiah Berlin. She was a Senior Scholar at Lincoln College, Oxford in 1988–1990, and a Hornik Junior Research Fellow in Intellectual History at Wolfson College, Oxford in 1990–1993.

== Career ==
Teaching at the University of Haifa since 1993, Oz-Salzberger was appointed associate professor in 2009. Her book Israelis in Berlin, which was published in 2001 in Hebrew and German, became a prism of Israeli–German dialog. She has taken part in media panels and interviews, commenting on politics, culture and literature, and contributed opinion articles to major newspapers and journals in Israel and globally. She is active on advisory boards of the Israel Democracy Institute and the German-Israeli Future Forum.

Oz-Salzberger served as joint editor in chief of the Haifa University Press (1996–99). She is director (since 2003) of the Posen Research Forum for Jewish European and Israeli Political Thought.

Oz-Salzberger was Fellow of the Institute for Advanced Study, Berlin (1999–2000). Between 2007 and 2012, she held the Leon Liberman Chair in Modern Israel Studies at Monash University's Australian Centre for Jewish Civilisation. In 2009–10 she was the Laurance S. Rockefeller Visiting Professor for Distinguished Teaching at the University Center for Human Values, Princeton University.

In November 2012, the book Jews and Words (ISBN 9780300156478), co-authored by Oz-Salzberger and her father, was published by Yale University Press. The book is an essay on Jewish history from a secular Israeli vantage point, reflecting an ongoing dialog between father and daughter, novelist and historian.

Oz-Salzberger has published essays in the history of ideas and political thought, translation in the European Enlightenment, the biblical sources of John Locke, and intercivilizational conflict. Her opinion pieces on politics, culture, and current affairs have been published in Newsweek, the International Herald Tribune, The Wall Street Journal, Le Figaro, Frankfurter Allgemeine Zeitung, and Ha’aretz.

Between 2016 and 2019 Oz-Salzberger was the director of Paideia – The European Institute for Jewish Studies in Sweden. In 2020 she became an honorary doctor at Uppsala University.

== Personal life ==
Oz-Salzberger is married to Professor Eli Salzberger. They have twin sons: Dean and Nadav.

== Published works ==
=== Books ===
- Oz-Salzberger, Fania (13 April 1995). Translating the Enlightenment: Scottish Civic Discourse in Eighteenth Century Germany (Reprint ed.). USA: Oxford University Press. ISBN 9780198205197.
- Oz-Salzberger, Fania (March 1997). Hebrew Phrase Book. Hunter Pub Inc. ISBN 9780852851814.
- Oz-Salzberger, Fania (1 October 2001). Israelis in Berlin (in German) (1. Aufl. ed.). Frankfurt am Main: Jüdischer Verlag im Suhrkamp-Verlag. ISBN 9783633541713.
- Oz, Amos; Oz-Salzberger, Fania (20 November 2012). Jews and Words. New Haven: Yale University Press. ISBN 9780300156478.
- (ed.) Adam Ferguson, An Essay on the History of Civil Society (Cambridge University Press, 1995)
- (ed.) with Adam Hofri, Adam Smith: Philosopher of the Enlightenment (Mapa, 2005)
- (ed.) with Eveline Goodman-Thau, Das jüdische Erbe Europas (Philo, 2005)
- (ed.) with Gordon Schochet and Meirav Jones, Political Hebraism: Judaic Sources in Early Modern Political Thought (Shalem, 2008)
- (ed.) with Thomas Maissen, The Liberal-Republican Quandary in Israel, Europe, and the United States: Early Modern Political Thought Meets Current Affairs (Academic Studies Press, 2012)
- (ed.) with Yedidia Stern, The Israeli Nation – State: Political, Constitutional and Cultural Challenges (Academic Studies Press, 2014)

=== Articles ===
- "The Secret German Sources of the Israeli Supreme Court", 3.2 Israel Studies 159-192 (Co-authored with Eli Salzberger) (1998)
- "Civil Society in the Scottish Enlightenment", Civil Society: History and Possibilities, 58-83 (S. Kaviraj and S. Khilnani Eds., Cambridge University Press, 2001)
- "Intellectual History", International Encyclopedia of the Social Sciences 7605-7612 (Elsevier, 2001)
- "The Jewish Roots of Western Freedom", 13 Azure 88-132 (2002)
- "The Political Theory of the Scottish Enlightenment", The Cambridge Companion to the Scottish Enlightenment (Alexander Broadie ed., Cambridge University Press, 2003)
- "Ferguson, Adam (1723–1816)", Oxford Dictionary of National Biography (2004)
- "The Political Thought of John Locke and the Significance of Political Hebraism", 1(5) Hebraic Political Studies 568–592 (Shalem, 2006)
- "The Enlightenment in Translation: Regional and European Aspects", 13:3 European Review of History 385 – 409 (2006)
- "On Rosenzweig, Israelis and Europe Today", 3 Rosenzweig Yearbook: The Notion of Europe 38-50 (2008)
- "Intercivilizational Conflict: Some Guidelines and Some Fault Lines", 1 The Israel Journal of Conflict Resolution 13-28 (2009)
- "Political Uses of the Hebrew Bible in Current Israeli Discourse: Transcending Right and Left", XXV Australian Journal of Jewish Studies 11-35 (2012)

=== Commentary ===
- History's Obligations : Europe Should Step in – and Look Israelis in the Eye, International Herald Tribune (29 March 2002)
- An Absurd Link? Europe Forgets Israel’s Origins, New York Times (27 June 2003)
- The Haifa and Bar Ilan Boycott, The Wall Street Journal (2 May 2005)
- Spain Before Poland, Haaretz (16 April 2007)
- With Friends Like These …, The Wall Street Journal (1 June 2007)
- Middle Israel to Middle Palestine, The Vienna Review (June 2008)
- Enter Livni, Forbes (18 September 2008)
- Infantry Among Infants, Forbes (29 December 2008)
- Go Ahead and Boycott Israel, The Guardian (15 January 2009)
- Israel's Baffling Election Explained, Forbes (11 February 2009)
- But Is It Good for Democracy? Israel's Dilemma, World Affairs (May/June 2010)
- Ashamed of My Country, Newsweek (1 June 2010)
- Israel's Inferno, Newsweek (5 December 2010)
- Fighting for minority rights is a sign of Israel's strength, Haaretz (28 January 2011)
- Pharaoh, Let My People Go: Are Egyptians the New Israelites?, Newsweek (6 February 2011)
- Goodbye to a Cross-Border Dreamer, Newsweek (10 April 2011)
- The Collective Has Come Apart, Haaretz (22 July 2011)
- A Still-Relevant Miracle, Haaretz (24 June 2011)
- With Friends Like These ..., Newsweek (18 September 2011)
- Debate on Shalit deal honors the Israeli public, Haaretz (23 October 2011)
- Resigned To Loss, But Optimism On The Center-Left, Newsweek (22 January 2013)
- Who’s a Jew?, Newsweek (5 February 2013)
- Why Obama Will Address Israelis, Not Their Politicians, Newsweek (19 March 2013)
- Habemus Papam? Habemus Controversy!, Newsweek (25 March 2013)
- For 21st-century patriots, tough love is the only love, Haaretz (4 April 2013)
- What America Means to Israel, Newsweek (22 April 2013)
- Can Religious Pluralism and an Official Rabbinate Coexist in Israel?, Moment Magazine (5 May 2014)
- Why bother delving into history?, Die Zeit (6 August 2014); Times of Israel (12 August 2014)
- Gaza-Krieg: Wo is der Blick für das Leid der Anderen?, Die Zeit (10 August 2014)
- The New Generation of Wired Hebrew Nomads, i24news (26 October 2014)
- Israel’s Right and Left Need a Common Refuge Away From This Vile, Dumbed-Down Campaign, Ha’aretz (17 February 2015)
- No, Prime Minister, Politico Europe (24 April 2015)
- [Netanyahu's Three Sins], i24News (28 April 2015)

== Awards and recognition ==
- 'The Scratch' – First prize in the Ha'aretz Short Story Competition, 1999.
- Honorary doctor, Uppsala University, 2020.
- Cross of the Order of Merit of the Federal Republic of Germany, 2021.

== See also ==
- Women of Israel
