= Herut (disambiguation) =

Herut was the major right-wing party in Israel until its merger into Likud.

Herut (Hebrew: חרות, lit. Freedom) may also refer to:

- Herut (newspaper), the name of a four different newspapers in Palestine and Israel between 1909 and 1965
- Herut, Israel, a moshav in central Israel
- Beit Herut, a moshav in central Israel
- Herut – The National Movement, a new Herut party created in 1998 by dissenting Likud members
- Herut Center for Israeli Liberty, the Israeli arm of the Jewish-American Tikvah Fund
