= David Hazony =

Israeli journalist (born 1969)

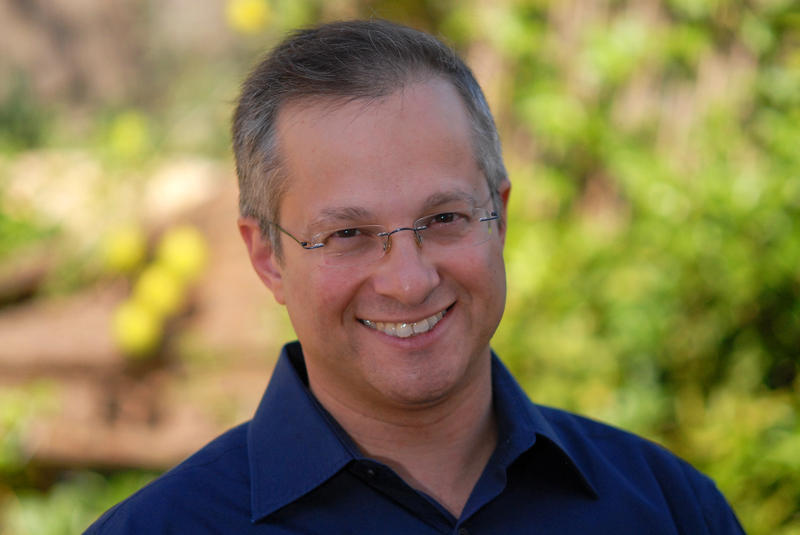
David Hazony

David Yair Hazony (Hebrew: דוד יאיר חזוני; born 1969) is an American-born Israeli writer, translator, and editor. He was the founding editor of The Tower Magazine from 2013 to 2017, and from 2017 to 2020 served as executive director of the Israel Innovation Fund. In 2020 he became an independent editor with Wicked Son Books. Since 2024, he serves as director and senior fellow at the Z3 Institute.

== Education ==
Hazony studied at Columbia University, received a B.A. and M.A. from Yeshiva University, and completed his Ph.D. at the Hebrew University of Jerusalem.

== Literary and publishing career ==
Hazony has written for the New Republic, CNN.com, The Forward, Commentary, Moment, The Jerusalem Post, the Jewish Chronicle, the New York Sun, Jewish Ideas Daily, and has appeared on CNN, MSNBC, and Fox News.

He was a fellow at the Shalem Center in Jerusalem, founded by his older brother Yoram Hazony, until 2007. In 2004–2007, he served as editor in chief of Azure, its quarterly.

From 2013 to 2017, he served as founding editor of The Tower Magazine, an online publication about Israel and the Middle East published by the Washington, D.C.–based Israel Project.

== Published works ==
Books:

- Editor of Young Zionist Voices: A New Generation Speaks Out (Wicked Son, November 2024).
- Editor of Jewish Priorities: Sixty-Five Proposals for the Future of Our People (Wicked Son, October 2023).
- Author of The Ten Commandments: How Our Most Ancient Moral Text Can Renew Modern Life (Scribner, September 2010), a finalist for the 2010 National Jewish Book Award.
- Edited Eliezer Berkovits, Essential Essays on Judaism (Shalem Press, 2002); Eliezer Berkovits, God, Man, and History (Shalem Press, 2004); and (together with Michael B. Oren and Yoram Hazony, eds.), New Essays on Zionism (Shalem Press, 2007).
- Translated Emuna Elon's novel If You Awaken Love (Toby, 2007), a finalist for the 2007 National Jewish Book Award.
- Translated Uri Bar-Joseph, "The Angel" (HarperCollins, 2016), winner of the 2017 National Jewish Book Award.
