= Bibi: My Story =

Autobiographical work by Benjamin Netanyahu

- Cover of the Hebrew edition
- Author: Benjamin Netanyahu
- Translator: Shaul Lilov (Hebrew edition)
- Language: English
- Subject: Autobiography
- Publisher: Threshold Editions
- Publication date: October 2022
- Publication place: United States
- Pages: 736 (English) 592 (Hebrew)

Bibi: My Story (Hebrew: ביבי:סיפור חיי) is an autobiography written by Israeli Prime Minister Benjamin Netanyahu, and published in October 2022. Published in English by Threshold Editions and in Hebrew by Sella Meir, it is Netanyahu's fourth book, written 25 years after his previous one.

The book recounts his personal life, military service, diplomatic and political career, and outlines his views on Israel's security and foreign policy.

Upon its release, the book achieved notable commercial success in Israel, while also generating public controversy and criticism regarding some of its content.

== Background ==
Netanyahu began working on the book while serving as leader of the opposition in Israel, following his departure from office in June 2021. According to reports, the writing process lasted about nine months.

The project was supported in part by the Tikvah Fund, which helped finance production, translation, and distribution costs.

Marketing of the book in both Hebrew and English editions began in August 2022 through advance sales. Its official release was moved up to October, weeks before the 2022 Israeli legislative election.
