= The Virtue of Nationalism =

2018 book by Yoram Hazony

- First edition
- Author: Yoram Hazony
- Publisher: Basic Books
- Publication date: 2018

The Virtue of Nationalism is a 2018 book by Israeli-American political theorist Yoram Hazony.

== Contents ==
Hazony argues that the nation state is the best form of government that humans have yet invented, contrasting both with historical empires and modern forms of global governance including United Nations affiliated institutions such as the International Court of Justice. In particular, Hazony argues that nationalism uniquely provides "the collective right of a free people to rule themselves."

According to Hazony, national identity is based not on race or biological homogeneity, but on "bonds of mutual loyalty" to a shared culture and a shared history that bind diverse groups into a national unit. Hazony argues that the social cohesion enabled by a nation-state where a common language and history are shared by the majority of the population can produce a level of trust that enables the production of social and moral goods, such as civil and political liberties.

He argues that, in contrast with systems like the European Union where member states are bound by measures taken by the Union, each nation state sets up unique systems, standards and administrative procedures, effectively producing a series of experiments that other nation states can freely copy as they strive for improvement.

Hazony asserts that it is a matter of historical fact that the rights and freedoms of individuals have been protected best by nation states, especially in England and in the United States. This, in his view, contrasts sharply with attempts at "universal political order . . . in which a single standard of right is held to be in force everywhere, tolerance for diverse political and religious standpoints must necessarily decline." Hazony argues that globalizing politically progressive elites have promoted a “global rule of law” that is intolerant of cultural differences, of patriotism, and of religious faith. Hazony writes that globalists promulgate "anti-nationalist hate," and are aggressively intolerant of cultural particularism. In Hazony's words, "liberal internationalism is not merely a positive agenda . . . It is an imperialist ideology that incites against . . . nationalists, seeking their delegitimization wherever they appear."

=== Israel and the European Union ===
In a juxtaposition that book reviewer Ira Stoll describes as the book's "strongest case" for nationalism, Hazony discusses the conflicting understanding held by Europeans and by Israelis.

In November 1942, as word seeped out of Europe about mass killings of Jewish families, Israel's founding Prime Minister Ben Gurion said that Jews were being "buried alive in graves dug by them . . . because the Jews have no political standing, no Jewish army, no Jewish independence, and no homeland."

== Criticism ==
John Fonte, writing in the National Review, described Virtue as a book "that will become a classic." In February 2019, the book won the Paolucci Book Award from the Intercollegiate Studies Institute.

Reviewing the book for The New York Times, Justin Vogt called Hazony's narrative a "reductive approach (that) poses a false choice between an idealized order of noble sovereign nations and a totalitarian global government." In Vogt's opinion, "The world could use a less moralistic, more nuanced defense of nationalism. This book is a missed opportunity." In that vein, critics of the book largely faulted Hazony's use of terms and categorizations. For instance, one review by Park MacDougald for New York magazine's the Intelligencer commented: "The book’s major flaw is that Hazony tends to define his terms as ideal types and then argue from those definitions." Likewise, another review by George Washington University professor Samuel Goldman in Modern Age stated that Hazony's argument "rests on a confusing and counterproductive use of terms."

Some reviewers commented that Hazony's theory and defense of nationalism does not appear to take into account the historical body of nationalist thought, possibly to make his position more palatable to his readership. For instance, an essay by Michael Shindler in Jacobite, notes that Hazony's theory is heavily derived from recent scholarship from Israel and the anglosphere (particularly Fania Oz-Salzberger's "The Jewish Roots of Western Freedom", and Philip Gorski's The Mosaic Moment), which depicts "nationalism as a descendant of the biblical Israeli model," as opposed to the "robust body of nationalist theory that’s been developing since the 19th century." This lack of engagement, Shindler claims, is "conspicuous" since that body of literature, though it is "quite cogent...admits that nationalism is culpable of precisely what it is accused of by its liberal critics."

== See also ==
- National conservatism
