= Eli Salzberger =

Israeli legal scholar (born 1960)

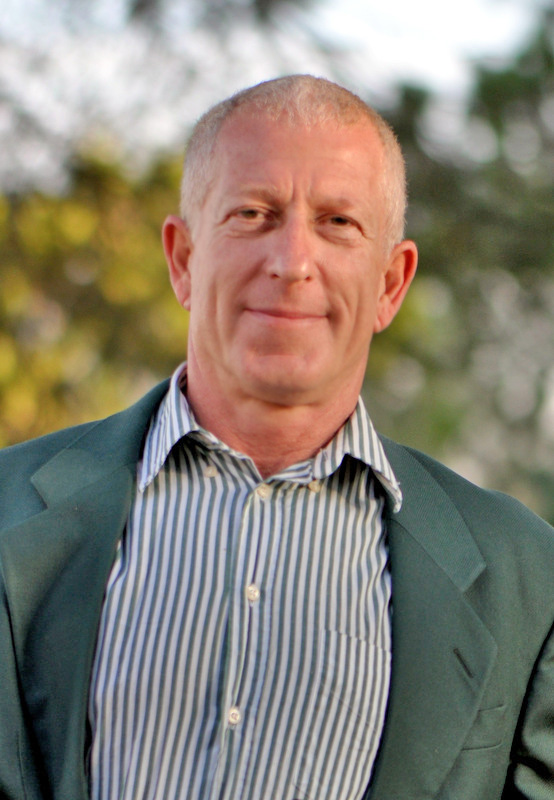
Eli Salzberger, 2013

Eli Mordechai Salzberger (Hebrew: עלי זלצברגר; born 12 March 1960), is a Law Professor at the University of Haifa Faculty of Law and former Dean of the faculty. From 2008 to 2011, he served as President of the European Association for Law and Economics.

== Biography ==
Salzberger was born in 1960 in Jerusalem, the son of Maccabi Salzberger (well-known gynecologist and Director of the Misgav Ladach maternity hospital), and Charlotte (Wreschner) Salzberger (co-founder of the school for Social Work at the Hebrew University of Jerusalem and Deputy Mayor of Jerusalem 1980–1990). He attended the Gymnasia Rehavia high school, and served as an officer in the intelligence corps of the Israel Defense Forces from 1978 to 1983. During his military service he studied Social Science at Tel Aviv University (1982–1983). Salzberger received his LL.B from the Hebrew University Faculty of Law in 1987 (first in his class) and concomitantly obtained a B.A. in economics. Subsequently, he clerked for Justice Aharon Barak of the Israeli Supreme Court and for deputy State Attorney Dorit Beinish (both of whom later became Presidents of Israel's Supreme Court); during that time he pursued a direct program towards Ph.D. at the Hebrew University.

From 1988 to 1993, Salzberger studied at Oxford University, where he was awarded a Senior Scholarship at Lincoln College. His doctoral dissertation, "Economic Analysis of the Doctrine of Separation of Powers: The Independence of the Judiciary", included an empirical study of judicial promotions in the UK.

Salzberger was the Jerusalem branch coordinator and an elected member of the board of directors of the Association for Civil Rights in Israel (1984–1988). Other public activities include membership in the public council of the Israeli Democracy Institute, a state commission for reforming performers' rights in Israel, and membership in a Ministry of Education supervisory committee for the civics curriculum. He is a member of the University of Haifa Board of Governors, Senate, and Executive Committee.

Salzberger is married to Professor Fania Oz-Salzberger. They have twin sons: Dean and Nadav.

== Academic career ==
Salzberger has taught at the Faculty of Law at the University of Haifa since 1993 (tenured senior lecturer in 1999, associate professor in 2004 and full professor in 2011). He was elected vice Dean (2002–2005) and Dean of the Faculty of Law (2005–2008).

Salzberger was the founder and a co-director of the Center for the Study of Crime, Law, and Society. He also served as co-editor of the Haifa Law Faculty's journal "Mishpat Umimshal" (Law and Government) for four years. Recently (2012), a team led by him won a competition for a new Minerva research center on the rule of law under extreme conditions. Salzberger's research and teaching areas are legal theory and philosophy, economic analysis of law, legal ethics, intellectual property and cyberspace, and the Israeli Supreme Court. He was a visiting professor at Princeton University, the University of Connecticut School of Law, UCLA Law School and a number of European law schools including Humboldt University in Berlin, Hamburg, Utrecht, Torino, Aix-Marseilles, St. Gallen, and Munich.

He was the first Israeli to serve as a member of the steering committee, and subsequently as the President, of the European Association for Law and Economics (EALE). He also served on the EALE board of European master's degree in Law and Economics.

Salzberger received numerous fellowships and prizes, notably the Rothschild, Fulbright, and British Council Fellowships, and research grants from the Minerva Foundation, the Israel Science Foundation, EU 7th research program, and the German-Israeli Foundation. He received an honorary doctorate from the University of Hamburg in June 2019.

== Published work (selection) ==
=== Books ===
- Law, Economics And Cyberspace: The Effects of Cyberspace on the Economic Analysis of Law (co-authored with Niva Elkin-Koren, Edward Elgar, 2004)
- Economic Analysis of Intellectual Property in the Digital Age: The Limits of Analysis (co-authored with Niva Elkin-Koren, Routledge-Cavendish, 2012)
- The Law and Economics of Innovation (ed., Edward Elger, 2012)

=== Academic articles ===
- "A Positive Analysis of the Doctrine of Separation of Powers, or: Why Do We have an Independent Judiciary?, 13 The International Review of Law and Economics (1993)
- "The Secret German Sources of the Israel Supreme Court" (co-authored with Fania Oz-Salzberger), Israel Studies (1998) (in German): 31 Kritische Justiz (1998)
- "Judicial Independence: Some Evidence from the English Court of Appeal" (co-authored with Paul Fenn), 42 The Journal of Law and Economics (1999)
- "Towards An Economic Theory of Unjust Enrichment Law" (co-authored with Niva Elkin-Koren), 20 International Review of Law and Economics (2000)
- "The Israeli Jurists Conspiracy – On the Israeli Bar and its Allies" 32 Mishpatim (2001)
- "On The Delegation Of Powers – With Special Emphasis on Central and Eastern Europe" (co-authored with Stefan Voigt), Constitutional Political Economy (2002)
- "Choosing Not To Choose: When Politicians Choose To Delegate Powers" (co-authored with Stefan Voigt), Kyklos 55 (2002)
- "Cyberspace, Governance and the New Economy: How Cyberspace Regulates Us and How Should We Regulate Cyberspace" in Economic Policy Issues in the New Economy (Horst Siebert, ed.) Springer, Berlin/Heidelberg (2002)
- "Temporary Appointments and Judicial Independence: Theoretical Thoughts and Empirical Findings from the Supreme Court of Israel," Israel Law Review 35 (2004)
- "The Prosecution of Public Figures and the Separation of Powers: Confusion within the Executive Branch – A Conceptual Framework" (co-authored with Anne van Aaken and Stefan Voigt), Constitutional Political Economy (2004)
- "The Independence of the Judiciary: An Economic Analysis of Law Perspective”, in Judicial Integrity (Andras Sajo, ed.), Koninklijke Brill NV, (2004)
- "Judicial Appointments and Promotions in Israel – Constitution, Law and Politics", in APPOINTING JUDGES IN THE AGE OF JUDICIAL POWER: CRITICAL PERSPECTIVES (Kate Malleson, Peter Russell, eds.) Toronto University Press (2005)
- "The Effects of Cyberspace on the Economic Theory of the State", in: How to Shape A Democratic State (Alain Marciano and Jean Michel Josslin, eds.) Edward Elgar, (2005)
- "Economic Analysis of the Public Domain", in: THE FUTURE OF THE PUBLIC DOMAIN (Bernt Hugenholtz, ed.), Kluwer Law International (2006)
- “The Economic Analysis of Law - The Dominant Methodology for Legal Research?!", 4 Haifa Law Review (2008)
- "Judicial Activism in Israel: Sources, Forms and Manifestations", in: Judicial Activism in Common Law Supreme Courts (Brice Dikson, ed.), Oxford University Press (2008), Oxford University Press (2008)
- "The Law and Economics Analysis of Intellectual Property: Paradigmatic Shift from Incentives to Traditional Property", Review of Law and Economics 7 (2010)

=== Current-Affairs and Opinion Articles ===
- The attorney general is not a judge – Haaretz (4.4.04)
- A constitutional blitz – Haaretz (11.7.07)
- War Crimes In Gaza – Forbes (16.9.09)

=== See also ===
- Hila Raz & Ido Baum, A profession in crisis – Haaretz (22.1.09)
- Salzberger Profile at Princeton University
- Salzberger Profile at the University of Haifa School of Law
