= Jewish Ideas Daily =

Former news and culture website

- Available in: English
- Founded: 2010
- Headquarters: {{{location_country}}}
- Website: jewishideasdaily.com

Jewish Ideas Daily was an American website that reported on the news, culture, and political issues relating to Judaism and Israel. Its mission was to be "the premier aggregator and originator of Jewish ideas on the web". It was founded in January 2010 under the editorship of Neal Kozodoy. Jewish Ideas Daily was a "sister" publication to the Jewish Review of Books.

Until December 2012, Jewish Ideas Daily was edited by Margot Lurie, who is an expert in Jewish culture and ideals. From December 2012 on its editor was Suzanne Garment.

In addition to original articles and reviews of scholarly Jewish books, Jewish Ideas Daily also included five "daily picks", linking to external articles, and podcasts on the weekly Torah portion by Michael Carasik. Essays originally published in Jewish Ideas Daily would frequently appear in The Jerusalem Post. A box highlighting the site's content appeared daily on many Jewish websites, including that of the Jewish Telegraphic Agency.

Jewish Ideas Daily drew notice for controversial features including one accusing Christopher Hitchens of antisemitism, and the public resignation of one of Peter Beinart's bloggers from the "Open Zion/Zion Square" blog.

John Podhoretz described Jewish Ideas Daily as "a peerless examination of intellectual, political, and cultural trends in Jewish life". According to British journalist Daniel Johnson, "Jewish Ideas Daily is among many manifestations of new intellectual life in the American Jewish world—a world that has always been marked by intensity and enlightenment".

In June 2013 Jewish Ideas Daily was succeeded by Mosaic. A free online magazine, it offers daily summaries and links to stories around the web of interest to readers, as well as an extensive "... full-length monthly essay on an issue or theme of pressing significance for Jews, Judaism, or the Jewish state". Issue topics range from cultural or religious questions through to social and philosophical topics with in depth responses appended throughout the month for the benefit of both Jewish and gentile readers.

Like Jewish Review of Books, and Jewish Ideas Daily, Mosaic is funded by the Tikvah Fund, a philanthropic foundation established by the late Zalman Bernstein.
