= Asher Crispe =

American Orthodox rabbi

Asher Crispe is an American Orthodox rabbi affiliated with the Chabad movement. A technology expert, futurist, and media enthusiast, he is the executive director of the Interinclusion website.

== Early life and family ==
Crispe is a ninth-generation native of Vermont. He and his wife Sara Esther returned to live in the state with their four children in 2015.

== Career ==
Crispe spent the years 1997 to 2004 in Israel, including one year as a research fellow for the Shalem Center in Jerusalem, a research institute for political theory and social thought. During this time, Crispe also served as the Educational Director of Torat Chesed.

Crispe founded Interinclusion in 2011. The nonprofit enterprise includes classes and group retreats at Crispe's Vermont home.

Crispe teaches and lectures in Jewish centers and academic institutions around the world on Hasidut and Kabbalistic philosophy. Some of his lectures focus on: music, film, architecture, gender studies, psychology, education, economics, regenerative medicine and physics. Crispe has lectured on Kabbalah on television and radio programs. He was an executive on the board of content for Chabad.org. He is also affiliated with Vermont Future Now, which supports students in the state.

Crispe has served as a financial, medical and technological consultant for projects that relate to future trends. He studied for a PhD in religious philosophy from New York University. Before founding Interinclusion, Crispe served as Chief Technology Officer of the hedge fund Link Capital Group.
