= Hebraic Political Studies =

- Discipline: Political history
- Language: English
- Edited by: Gordon Schochet, Arthur Eyffinger

Publication details
- History: 2005-2009
- Publisher: Shalem Press (Israel)
- Frequency: Quarterly
- Open access: Yes

Standard abbreviations
- ISO 4: Hebr. Political Stud.

Indexing
- ISSN: 1565-6640
- OCLC no.: 61480010

Links
- Journal homepage; Online access

Hebraic Political Studies was a quarterly peer-reviewed academic journal published by the Shalem Press, funded by the Tikvah Fund-sponsored Shalem Center, and devoted to recovering the Hebraic political tradition and evaluating its place in the history of political thought.

== History ==
According to Carlin Romano, the Journal emerged from a 2004 conference on Jewish Sources in Early Modern Political Thought held at Jerusalem's Mishkenot Sha'ananim convention center.

In 2004, the Shalem Center announced a call for papers for a conference on political Hebraism and, according to Gordon Schochet (Rutgers University), "the enthusiastic response convinced us there was a need for a journal." The journal was established in 2005 with Schochet and Arthur Eyffinger (Huygens Institute for the History of the Netherlands) as editors-in-chief. The journal was devoted to the recovery and exploration of the Hebraic political tradition, that is, the uses of biblical, Talmudic, rabbinic, and other Jewish and Judaic sources by Christian and Muslim as well as Jewish authors in the history of political thought.

The journal's last issue appeared Fall 2009, and its website states that it is no longer accepting submissions.

== Reception ==
Allan Arkush (Binghamton University) compared the journal with the other Shalem Center publication "Azure", which, Arkush argued, was seen by many as a "neoconservative" political magazine. Despite different editorship and stated goals, the two magazines shared many characteristics, with both sharing characteristics of the reputation of each. In the end, Arkush argues,

...Hebraic Political Studies may turn out to be a journal of more interest to students of forgotten corners of modern intellectual history than to people who aspire to revitalize liberalism in Israel in particular or in the Western world in general.

== Abstracting and indexing ==
The journal is abstracted and indexed in:

- International Political Science Abstracts
- Political Science Complete
- Social Services Abstracts
- Sociological Abstracts
- Worldwide Political Science Abstracts
