= Israel: A Concise History of a Nation Reborn =

2016 book by Daniel Gordis

- Author: Daniel Gordis
- Genre: Nonfiction, history, Israel
- Publisher: Ecco (HarperCollins)
- Publication date: October 18, 2016
- Publication place: United States
- Pages: 560
- ISBN: 978-0062368744 (US)

Israel: A Concise History of a Nation Reborn is a 2016 non-fiction book by U.S.-born and Jerusalem-based author and scholar Daniel Gordis. The book was Gordis's 11th and preceded his 2019 book We Stand Divided: The Rift Between American Jews and Israel.

Israel: A Concise History received generally positive reviews from critics, and it was named the 2016 Jewish Book of the Year by the Jewish Book Council.

== Content ==
In the book, Gordis aims to provide the first accessible narrative history of the Jewish people and the state of Israel to a general readership, seeking to explain how Israel became a cultural, economic, and military powerhouse. Gordis also identifies where he believes Israel made mistakes. According to Gordis, other volume histories of Israel only tell what happened, rather than explain why.

Gordis begins by recounting Theodor Herzl's vision of a Jewish homeland. He then narrates through the leaders and pioneers of the Zionist movement, such as Ahad Ha'am, Hayim Nahman Bialik, A. D. Gordon, Ze'ev Jabotinsky, and Max Nordau, writing portraits alongside historical context such as the 1921 Cairo Conference. Gordis describes the rise of the "new Jew" concept and describes Zionism as "a conversation, not an ideology." Gordis discusses Israel's ability to absorb millions of immigrants, even when the Israeli economy was weak. He also discusses Israel's wars and their respective consequences. Speaking of the Six-Day War in 1967, Gordis explains the state of domestic euphoria following Israel's victory.

Later, Gordis discusses the Arabs and, later, the Palestinians' refusal to accept terms for peace and the ensuing violence after each refusal. Throughout the book, Gordis moves toward present-day Israel to explain modern Israeli moods and realities, eventually admitting that Israelis in contemporary times have "no choice" but to overcome the challenges from a conflict that "grinds on endlessly."

== Reception ==
The book was Gordis's 11th and preceded his 2019 book We Stand Divided: The Rift Between American Jews and Israel.

The book was named the 2016 Jewish Book of the Year by the Jewish Book Council. It was Gordis's second Jewish Book of the Year Award. He won in 2009 for Saving Israel.

In the Jerusalem Post, Seth Franzman said that Gordis was "well-placed to write a book like this" and had written a "fast-flowing, convincing narrative." Franzman highlighted Gordis's strength in providing "corrective to the typical Labor Zionist narrative" and "discussing the role and importance of Mizrahi Jewish immigration, the increasing role of religion in society and how Israelis have become 'hungry for meaning, yearning for roots.'" However, Franzman noted that Gordis was light on providing reasons for the current state of affairs and solutions to the problems that Gordis identifies in the book.

Author Philip K. Jason suggested in the Jewish Book Council that the book " should become a standard for years to come, perhaps even a classic."

Karl Wolff, in the New York Journal of Books, recommended the book "for those interested in an introductory volume about the Jewish people and Israeli history." He notes Gordis's attempt to correct revisionist history while also discussing Israel's more egregious acts. Wolff praises the book for striking a delicate balance between the stories of everyday Israelis and "Great Man" profiles. However, Wolff noted the omission of Arab citizens of Israel.

== TV adaptation ==
In 2021, production company Stone Canyon Entertainment acquired the rights to adapt the book into a six-episode television docuseries directed by Matthew Mishory. The producers planned to film content around subsequent events since the book's release, such as the Abraham Accords, Israel's green economy, Israeli diversity, and the Middle East's shifting geopolitics.
