= Conservatism: A Rediscovery =

2022 book by Yoram Hazony

- US first edition cover
- Author: Yoram Hazony
- Audio read by: Richard Ferrone
- Language: English
- Subjects: Political philosophy; History
- Publisher: Regnery Gateway (USA); Forum (UK)
- Publication date: May 17, 2022 (USA); August 25, 2022 (UK)
- Publication place: United States
- Media type: Print, digital, audiobook
- Pages: 480 (hardcover); 489 (ebook)
- ISBN: 978-1684511099 (USA); 978-1800752337 (UK)

Conservatism: A Rediscovery is a 2022 book by Israeli political philosopher Yoram Hazony. It outlines his philosophy of national conservatism by examining its history, legal tradition, and philosophical commitments. He outlines the history of a distinctive Anglo-American tradition of political conservatism which he argues should be restored and renewed in order to meet the challenges of the current age.

== Overview ==
Hazony traces the history of what he calls ‘Anglo-American Conservatism’ from the jurisprudence of English judge John Fortescue to Richard Hooker, Edward Coke, John Selden, and Edmund Burke through to many of the leaders of the American Revolution, particularly George Washington, John Jay, Gouverneur Morris, John Adams, and Alexander Hamilton.

According to Hazony,

"The Anglo-American tradition is rooted in the ideal of a free and just national state, whose origin is in the Hebrew Bible. This ideal includes a conception of the nation as arising out of diverse tribes, its unity anchored in a common traditional language, law, and religion."

He critiques liberalism, arguing that

"To the extent that Anglo-American conservatism has become confused with liberalism, it has, for just this reason, become incapable of conserving anything at all. Indeed, in our day conservatives have largely become bystanders, gaping in astonishment as the consuming fire of cultural revolution destroys everything in its path."

In place of liberalism, Hazony argues for the centrality of societal hierarchies, loyalty, honor, and the conservation and renewal of traditional institutions such as the traditional family and public religion. Hazony argues that an alternative political paradigm to the liberal one is offered by conservatism, which he summarises in the following way:

1. Men are born into families, tribes, and nations to which they are bound by ties of mutual loyalty.
2. Individuals, families, tribes, and nations compete for honor, importance, and influence, until a threat or a common endeavor recalls them to the mutual loyalties that bind them to one another.
3. Families, tribes, and nations are hierarchically structured, their members having importance and influence to the degree they are honored within the hierarchy.
4. Language, religion, law, and the forms of government and economic activity are traditional institutions, developed by families, tribes, and nations as they seek to strengthen their material prosperity, internal integrity, and cultural heritage and to propagate themselves through future generations.
5. Political obligation is a consequence of membership in families, tribes, and nations.
6. These premises are derived empirically from experience, and they may be challenged and improved upon in light of experience.
