= Suzanne Garment =

American scholar, writer, editor and attorney

- Born: Suzanne Rose Bloom
- Other names: Suzanne Rose Garment; Suzanne Weaver
- Education: Radcliffe College (A.B.); University of Sussex (M.A.); Harvard University (PhD); Georgetown University (J.D.)
- Occupations: Scholar, writer, editor and attorney
- Spouse(s): Paul Harold Weaver Leonard Garment (died 2013)
- Children: 1

Suzanne Garment (née Bloom) is an American scholar, writer, editor and attorney.

Garment is best known for her book Scandal: The Culture of Mistrust in American Politics, and for her work as an aide to Ambassador Daniel Patrick Moynihan working to block the 1975 United Nations General Assembly Resolution 3379 of the United Nations that "Zionism is a form of racism and racial discrimination".

== Education and career ==
Garment holds an A.B. degree from Radcliffe College, an M.A. from the University of Sussex in the United Kingdom, a PhD in political science from Harvard University, the J.D. and a master of laws degree in taxation from Georgetown University

She has served as a visiting scholar at the Indiana University Center on Philanthropy at Indiana University; special counsel to Richard Ravitch, New York Lieutenant Governor and as counsel to the Task Force on the State Budget Crisis, co-chaired by Ravitch and former Federal Reserve chairman Paul Volcker. Before earning the J.D., she was a scholar at the American Enterprise Institute; associate editorial page editor of The Wall Street Journal; author of the "Capital Chronicle" column at The Wall Street Journal; and special assistant to Daniel Patrick Moynihan, U.S. ambassador to the United Nations. Garment has taught politics and public policy at Yale and Harvard universities. She was the executive editor of Jewish Ideas Daily.

== Personal life ==
She was married to Leonard Garment; they have a daughter, Ann.

== Books ==
External videos
- Booknotes interview with Garment on Scandal, November 17, 1991, C-SPAN

- Scandal: The Culture of Mistrust in American Politics (Anchor; 1991)
- A Dangerous Place co-author with Daniel P. Moynihan (Little Brown)
