= Yoram Hazony =

Israeli-American philosopher (born 1964)

- יורם חזוני
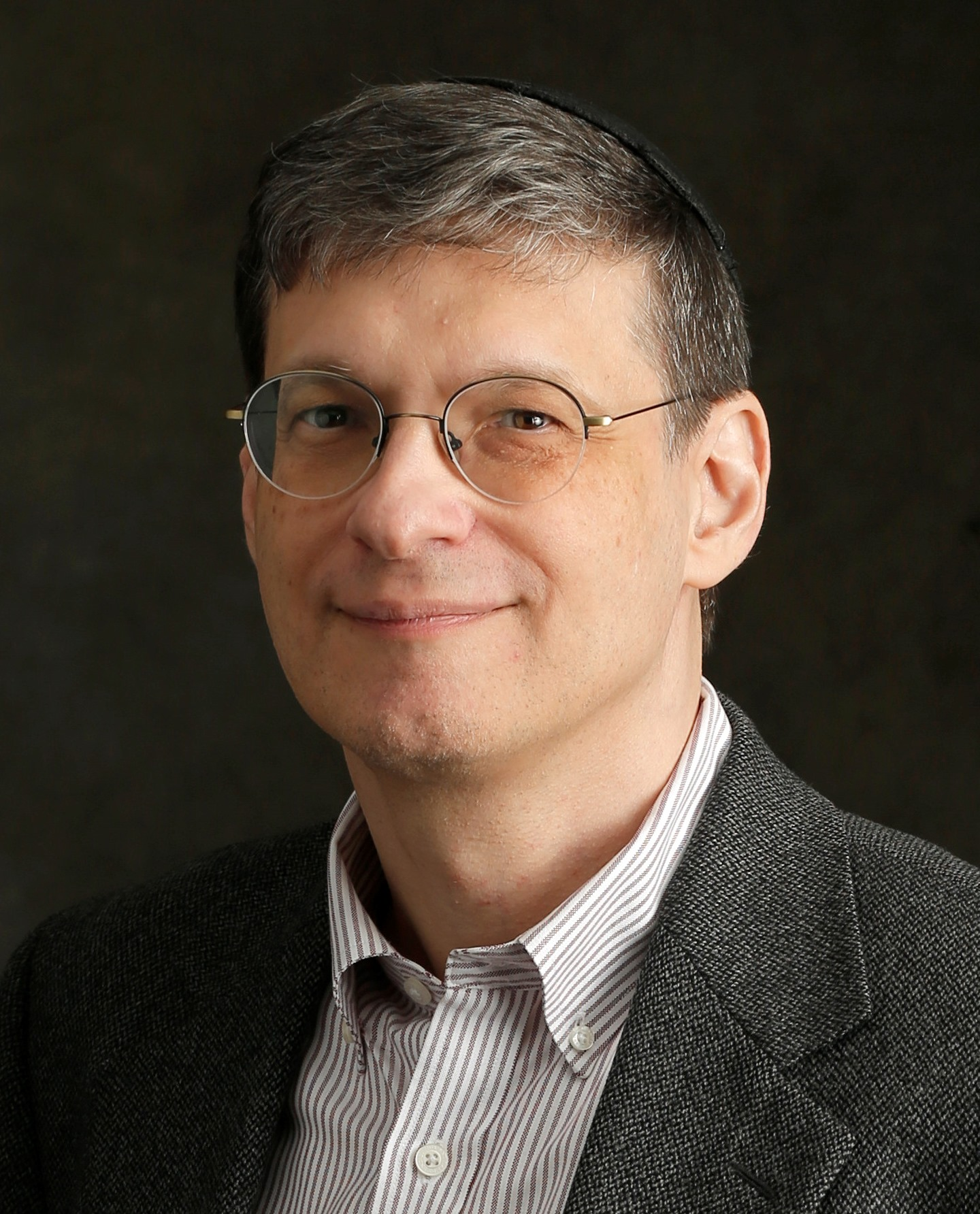
- Hazony in 2018
- Born: Yoram Reuben Hazony; 1964 (age 61–62); Rehovot, Israel
- Citizenship: American; Israeli
- Education: Princeton University (BA); Rutgers University (PhD)
- Notable work: The Virtue of Nationalism (2018); Conservatism: A Rediscovery (2022)
- Movement: National conservatism, Jewish conservatism
- Spouse: Yael Hazony
- Children: 9
- Relatives: David Hazony (brother)
- Website: yoramhazony.org

Yoram Reuben Hazony (Hebrew: יורם חזוני; born 1964) is an Israeli-American philosopher, Bible scholar, and political theorist. He is president of the Herzl Institute in Jerusalem and serves as the chairman of the Edmund Burke Foundation. He has argued for national conservatism in his 2018 book The Virtue of Nationalism and 2022's Conservatism: A Rediscovery.

== Biography ==
Yoram Hazony was born in Rehovot, Israel, and moved with his family to Princeton, New Jersey, US. He was raised and educated in the United States and returned to live in Israel after finishing university. Hazony received his BA from Princeton University in East Asian studies in 1986 and his PhD from Rutgers University in political philosophy in 1993. While a junior at Princeton, he founded The Princeton Tory, a magazine for conservative thought. He is the brother of David Hazony. He married Yael Fulton, an American whom he met at Princeton, and she moved to Israel with him. The couple live in Jerusalem and have nine children.

== Academic and journalistic career ==
Hazony founded the Shalem Center in Jerusalem in 1994 and was president and then provost until 2012. He helped design the curriculum for Shalem College, Israel's first liberal arts college, established in 2013. Hazony has served as director of the John Templeton Foundation's project in Jewish Philosophical Theology and as a member of the Israel Council for Higher Education committee examining general studies programs in Israel's universities and colleges.

He authors a blog on philosophy, politics, Judaism, Israel, and higher education, called Jerusalem Letters. Hazony has published in outlets including The New York Times, Wall Street Journal, and American Affairs.

== Religious and political views ==
Hazony is a Modern Orthodox Jew and relates his views on Open Orthodoxy in an article published in 2014. In it, he states that he fears that Open Orthodoxy is acting as an ideological echo chamber in which any unapproved views are ridiculed and quashed without debate. Hazony describes his concern that elements of Open Orthodoxy have seemingly decided to accept all conclusions of academic Bible critics as indisputable fact, without even going through the motions of investigating whether these conclusions are true.

Hazony is an outspoken Judeo-nationalist and has written that nationalism uniquely provides "the collective right of a free people to rule themselves". In 2018, his book, The Virtue of Nationalism was released by Basic Books. In 2019, it was named "Conservative Book of the Year" by the Intercollegiate Studies Institute. It has been read and recommended by heads of state, including Viktor Orbán and Giorgia Meloni. It has been called a "key text of the nationalist right", and Hazony has been cited as an intellectual influence on American vice president JD Vance.

Some critics maintain that The Virtue of Nationalism is theoretically inconsistent or incoherent and that it bears little relation to the historical body of nationalist thought. Writing for the Tel Aviv Review of Books, Yair Wallach argued that Hazony's 2020 book, A Jewish State: Herzl and the Promise of Nationalism, is characterised by "intellectual dishonesty", in part for presenting a selective account of Theodor Herzl's understanding of Zionism and nationalism.

Hazony organized and spoke at the National Conservatism Conference in England in May 2023, where he stated that the United Kingdom was plagued with woke "neo-Marxist" agitators who want to detach Britons from their entire past, and called for the return of mandatory military service.

In a 1990 issue of The Jerusalem Post, Hazony wrote an obituary praising the religious-ultranationalist politician, rabbi, writer, and convicted terrorist Meir Kahane. He stated that he and other American Jewish students were inspired by Kahane's speeches and books to believe that Judaism and their Jewish identity "could be something we didn't have to be embarrassed about, that we should be proud to wear a kipa and make our stand on the world stage as Jews". Hazony said that he and many other Jews did not adopt Kahane's political beliefs because of Kahane's "predilection for violent solutions to problems" and his "abusive manner of presenting his case", but he expressed gratitude to Kahane for being someone who "changed our lives, thrilled and entertained us, helped us grow up into strong Jewish men and women".

After first hearing Kahane speak in 1984, Hazony began to quote him in political debates. Some critics believe Hazony adopted some of Kahane's extremist beliefs, such as his racist views towards Arabs and his opinions on how Israel should be governed. In 2024, Hazony described Benjamin Netanyahu as the greatest statesman Israel had seen since David Ben-Gurion.

== Published works ==
Books

- The Political Philosophy of Jeremiah: Theory, Elaboration, and Applications, (doctoral dissertation, 1993)
- The Dawn: Political Teachings of the Book of Esther (1995)
- The Jewish State: The Struggle for Israel's Soul (New York: Basic Books and The New Republic, 2000)
- The Philosophy of Hebrew Scripture (Cambridge: Cambridge University Press, 2012)
- God and Politics in Esther (Cambridge: Cambridge University Press, 2016)
- The Virtue of Nationalism (New York: Basic Books, 2018)
- A Jewish State: Herzl and the Promise of Nationalism [Hebrew] (Sella Meir and Tikvah Fund, 2020)
- Conservatism: A Rediscovery (Washington: Regnery, 2022)

Edited books

- David Hazony, Yoram Hazony, and Michael Oren, eds., New Essays on Zionism (Jerusalem: Shalem Press, 2006).
- Introduction to Aaron Wildavsky, Moses as Political Leader (Jerusalem: Shalem Press, 2005).
- Yoram Hazony and Dru Johnson, eds., The Question of God's Perfection (Leiden: Brill, 2018).
- Yoram Hazony, Gil Student, and Alex Sztuden, eds., The Revelation at Sinai: What Does 'Torah from Heaven' Mean? (New York: Ktav, 2021).

Translated books

- Iddo Netanyahu, Yoni's Last Battle: the Rescue at Entebbe, 1976 Yoram Hazony, trans. (Jerusalem: Gefen, 2001).
