= National conservatism =

Nationalist strand of conservatism

National conservatism is a variant of conservatism that prioritises the defense of national and cultural identity, often based on a theory of the family as a model for the state. It is oriented towards upholding national sovereignty, which includes opposing illegal immigration or immigration per se and having a strong military. National conservatism departs from economic liberalism and libertarianism and takes a more pragmatic approach to regulatory economics, national capitalism, and protectionism.

National conservatism opposes the basic precepts of enlightenment liberalism such as individualism and the universality of human rights, and in America and Europe, is majoritarian populist. National-conservative parties often have roots in rural environments, contrasting with the more urban support base of liberal-conservative parties.

National conservatives usually embrace some form of Euroscepticism. In post-communist central and eastern Europe specifically, most conservative parties since 1989 have followed a national conservative ideology.

Viktor Orbán in Hungary explicitly had his government fund national conservative institutions across Europe and the United States, such as the Danube Institute, the Mathias Corvinus Collegium, The European Conservative magazine, and the National Conservatism Conference.

In the United States, Trumpism can be considered a variety of national conservatism, which also gives its name to the National Conservatism Conference, organised by the Edmund Burke Foundation.

== Ideology ==
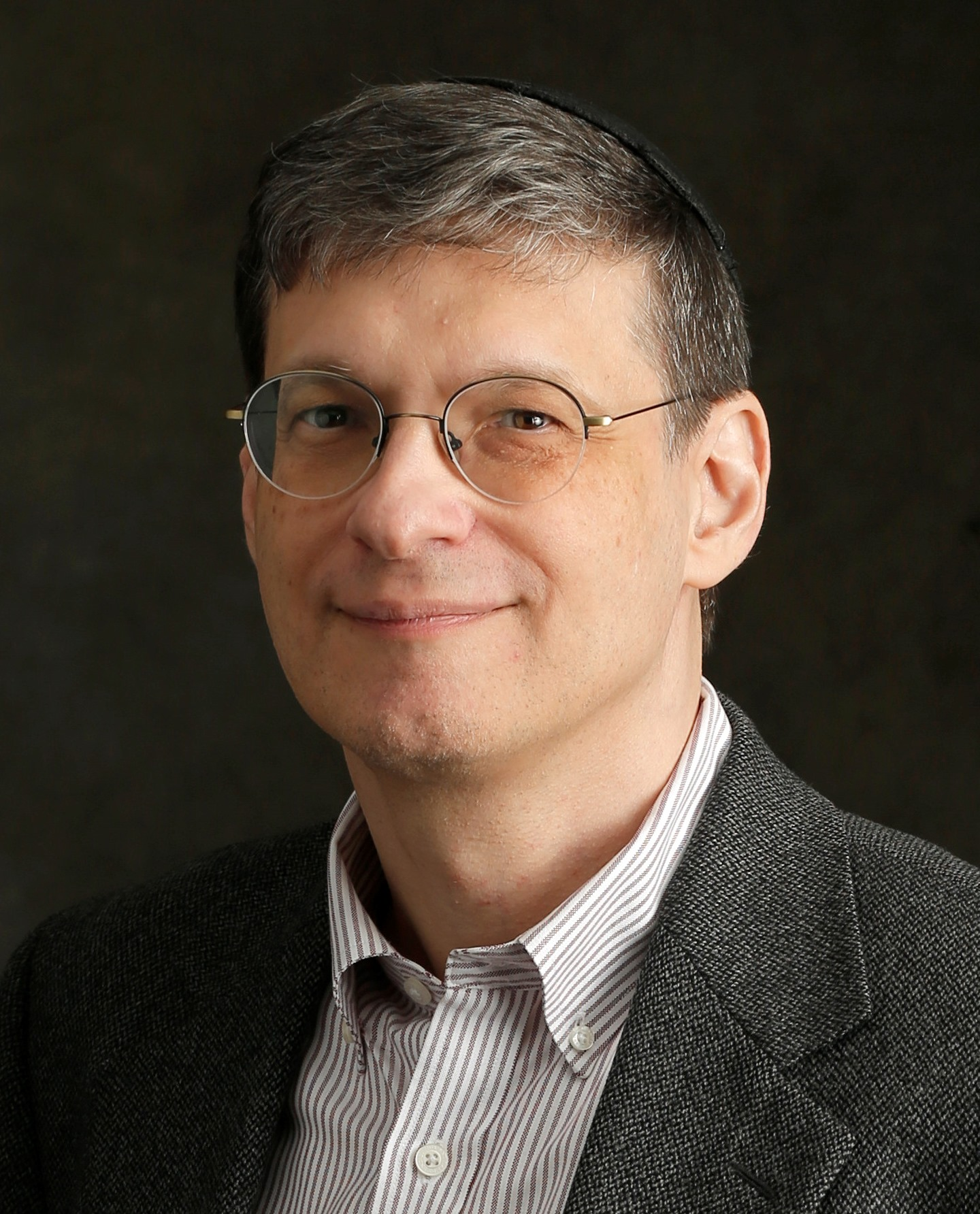
Yoram Hazony in 2018

National conservatism focuses on "threats to moral order and the loss of moral bearing due to liberalism's relativism". It rejects the basic precepts of enlightenment liberalism, such as individualism and the universality of human rights. In America and Europe, national conservatives are majoritarian populists and advocate for fewer limits on the power of elected representatives to "smash the liberal state".

National conservatism opposes modernity, secularism, liberalism, socialism, communism and anarchism, instead valuing Europe's Christian heritage and "defending" Western civilization.

National conservatism is similar to conservatism in Europe before World War I, epitomized by statesmen such as Otto von Bismarck and Franz Joseph I.

=== Criticism of liberalism ===
In The Virtue of Nationalism, Yoram Hazony criticises Jean-Jacques Rousseau and John Locke for creating a "dream world" in which the "Jewish and Christian world" have "no place to exist". Patrick Deneen argues that the "current elite" should be replaced with "a better aristocracy brought about by a muscular populism" to advance the "common good", with the common good loosely defined as "integration" that includes the reunification of church and state.

National conservatism disagrees with liberalism and socialism over the interpretation of key historical developments, such as the Enlightenment, modernization, and emancipation, and key political events like those that occurred in 1789, 1968, and 1989. National conservatism is silent on classical conservative thought expressed by Michael Oakeshott and Edmund Burke.

=== Comparison with fascism ===
While national conservatism distances itself from fascism, some forms of what scholars like Roger Griffin term "para-fascism"—a type of authoritarian nationalism that seeks to preserve traditional structures rather than pursue a palingenetic ultranationalism—are seen as aligning more closely with the tenets of national conservatism than with pure fascism. In his 2022 book Conservatism: A Rediscovery, Hazony wrote that "in the political arena, conservatism refers to a standpoint that regards the recovery, restoration, elaboration, and repair of national and religious traditions as the key to maintaining a nation and strengthening it through time."

National conservatism distances itself from fascism, viewing it—along with liberalism and socialism—as aspects of modernity that "disconnect human designs from normative order", instead calling for the "restoration and order" of social, moral, and political structures.

=== Contemporary leaders ===
In the 2010s and particularly the 2020s, national conservatism has become the ideology of many world leaders, including the United States under Donald Trump, Israel under Benjamin Netanyahu, Russia under Vladimir Putin, and India under Narendra Modi.

== Policies ==
=== Social policies ===
Ideologically, national conservatism is not uniform. Adherents have broadly expressed support for nationalism, patriotism, cultural assimilationism, and monoculturalism. At the same time, there is expressed opposition to internationalism, racial politics, multiculturalism, and globalism. National conservatives adhere to a form of cultural nationalism that emphasizes the preservation of national identity as well as cultural identity. As a result, many favor assimilation into the dominant culture, restrictions on immigration and strict law and order policies. National conservative parties support traditional family values, gender roles, and the public role of religion, being critical of the separation of church and state. According to the Austrian political scientist Sieglinde Rosenberger, "national conservatism praises the family as a home and a center of identity, solidarity, and tradition." It opposes the "1968 agenda" of gender-related emancipation.

=== Economic policies ===
National conservatives in different countries do not necessarily share a common position on economic policy. Their views may range from support of corporatism, mixed economy, national capitalism (mostly), economic nationalism, protectionism to a more laissez-faire approach. In the first, more common case, national conservatives can be distinguished from liberal conservatives, for whom free market economic policies, deregulation, and tight spending are the main priorities.

Some commentators have indeed identified a growing gap between national and economically liberal conservatism: "Most parties of the Right [today] are run by economically liberal conservatives who, in varying degrees, have marginalised social, cultural and national conservatives." National conservatism developed its economic alternative to liberalism through political representatives in post-communist Europe, most notably Poland and Hungary, and the emergence of "pro-worker conservatism" in the United States. Throughout the 1990s, economic positions of national conservatives were largely fusionist. The works of Leo Strauss and Eric Voegelin have served as building blocks for the modern national conservative movement's socio-economic policies. Strauss's indictment of capitalism as 'economism' through the reduction of individual needs to consumption plays a role in national conservative thought, which argues for solidarism and an increased statist role in the economy to bring about a moralizing "financial nationalism" in opposition to communism and the individualism of liberalism. Depending on the country, this can include increased support of protectionism, increased state social spending for "pro-worker" and "pro-family" conservatism, the re-nationalization of banks and strategic enterprises, and opposing tax breaks. It supports "social nativism" in East Asian state-led development as a socio-economic policy paradigm.

=== Foreign policy ===
National conservatives usually support a foreign policy that upholds the interests of their nation. They lean towards militarism, unilateralism, and isolationism. They reject the internationalism and multilateralism that have characterized the modern age. They often have a negative view of the United Nations, feeling that its multinational agenda erodes their unique national identity, as well as the European Union and other international organizations.

== Geography and demographics ==
National conservatism has gained ground across the Western world in recent decades, but has been particularly strong in certain countries and among certain demographic groups. Costas Panayotakis has argued that the economic inequality engendered by neoliberalism contributed to the rise of national conservatism.

In the 2020s, national conservatism was described as causing a "new global divide", particularly in the Western world. Several very close elections pitted a national conservative candidate against a liberal candidate, with national conservative candidates sometimes winning. These included the 2024 United States presidential election (Donald Trump defeated Kamala Harris by 1.5%) and the 2025 Polish presidential election (Karol Nawrocki defeated Rafał Trzaskowski by 1.8%). Conversely, in the 2025 Romanian presidential election centrist Nicușor Dan defeated the far-right national conservative George Simion by 7.2%, though the Financial Times still described this as a close election.

National conservatism has gained notable ground in post-communist Eastern Europe (east of the former Iron Curtain). The national conservative and far-right Alternative for Germany is strongest in former East Germany. The Law and Justice party in Poland is strongest in Poland B, with Poland considered a post-communist European country. Russia, under the rule of Vladimir Putin, has waged an irredentist invasion of Ukraine since 2022. Putin has implemented and espoused national conservatism through his affiliated United Russia party.

Regional or regionalist parties can be nationalist or national conservative, without aligning with the country to which the region belongs. South Tyrol is one example, as "national conservative" parties there represent its German-speaking majority and identify with neighbouring Austria, with which South Tyrol shares cultural and historical ties.

== Political parties ==
Political parties or political parties containing factions characterised as being ideologically influenced by national conservatism:

=== Current ===
- Albania: Democratic Party of Albania,
- Argentina: Democratic Party,
- Austria: Freedom Party of Austria, Alliance for the Future of Austria
- Australia: Pauline Hanson's One Nation
- Belgium: Flemish Interest
- Bosnia and Herzegovina: Party of Democratic Progress
- Bulgaria: Union of Democratic Forces, Democrats for a Strong Bulgaria, Democratic Party,
- Cambodia: Cambodian People's Party,
- Croatia: Croatian Democratic Union,
- Czech Republic: ANO 2011
- Denmark: Danish People's Party, The New Right,
- Estonia: Isamaa
- Finland: Finns Party
- France: National Rally, France Arise, Action Française,
- Germany: Alternative for Germany, The Republicans,
- Greece: Greek Solution, New Right,
- Hungary: Fidesz, Christian Democratic People's Party, Our Homeland Movement, Independent Smallholders Party, Jobbik
- India: Bharatiya Janata Party, Hindu Mahasabha
- Indonesia: Great Indonesia Movement Party, Golkar
- Israel: Likud,
- Italy: South Tyrolean Freedom
- Japan: Liberal Democratic Party
- Latvia: National Alliance,
- Lithuania: Homeland Union,
- Malaysia: United Malays National Organisation
- Malta: Aħwa Maltin
- Monaco: Monegasque National Union
- Netherlands: Forum for Democracy,
- North Macedonia: VMRO-DPMNE,
- Norway: Progress Party,
- Panama: Panameñista Party
- Paraguay: Colorado Party
- Philippines: Nacionalista Party
- Poland: United Right, (Law and Justice and United Poland), Confederation Liberty and Independence (factions, mainly National Movement), Right Wing of the Republic
- Portugal: CDS – People's Party, Chega
- Romania: National Identity Bloc in Europe (Greater Romania Party and United Romania Party), Alliance for the Union of Romanians, People's Movement Party, Christian Democratic National Peasants' Party, Romanian National Conservative Party
- Russia: All-Russia People's Front (United Russia and Rodina), Great Russia, Russian All-People's Union
- Serbia: Democratic Party of Serbia, Serbian Radical Party, Serbian Patriotic Alliance, United Serbia, Serbian People's Party, People's Peasant Party, New Serbia, Better Serbia, Fatherland, People's Freedom Movement, Serbian Party Oathkeepers, Serbian Right, Obraz, Movement for the Restoration of the Kingdom of Serbia
- Singapore: People's Action Party
- Slovakia: Slovak National Party, Republic, We Are Family
- Slovenia: Slovenian Democratic Party
- South Korea: People Power Party
- Spain: Vox
- Sweden: Sweden Democrats
- Switzerland: Swiss People's Party, Federal Democratic Union
- Taiwan: Kuomintang (Chinese Nationalist Party), New Party, Taiwan Solidarity Union
- Thailand: Palang Pracharath Party, United Thai Nation Party
- Turkey: People's Alliance (Justice and Development Party, Nationalist Movement Party and Great Union Party), Nation Alliance (factions, mainly Good Party) and Homeland Party, National Path Party, Key Party, Victory Party, Nation Party, New Turkey Party
- Ukraine: Congress of Ukrainian Nationalists, People's Front, Svoboda, National Corps, Right Sector
- United Kingdom: Democratic Unionist Party, UK Independence Party
- United States: Republican Party (factions) Alaskan Independence Party, American Party of the United States
- Uruguay: Open Cabildo

=== Defunct ===
- Armenia: Law and Unity
- Australia: Fraser Anning's Conservative National Party
- Belgium: Rexist Party, Vlaams Blok
- Brazil: Brazilian Integralist Action
- Canada: Union Nationale
- Czech Republic: Realists
- Czechoslovakia: Czechoslovak National Democracy, Party of National Unity
- France: Rally for the Republic
- Germany: German National People's Party, Deutsche Rechtspartei, The Blue Party, German People's Union
- Hungary: Hungarian Democratic Forum, Unity Party
- India: Bharatiya Jana Sangh
- Iran: Rastakhiz Party
- Israel: National Union (Hatikva), Union of Right-Wing Parties
- Italy: National Alliance, The Right
- Moldova: Șor Party
- Norway: Fatherland League
- Poland: National Democracy, League of Polish Families, Kukiz'15
- Portugal: National Union
- Romania: Conservative Party,
- Slovakia: Slovak People's Party, Slovak National Party, People's Party – Movement for a Democratic Slovakia, Conservative Democrats of Slovakia
- South Africa: National Party
- South Korea: Democratic Republican Party Democratic Justice Party, New Korea Party, Liberty Korea Party
- Spain: CEDA, People's Alliance
- Yugoslavia: Yugoslav Radical Union, Yugoslav National Movement

=== European Parliament ===
- European Conservatives and Reformists Party, European Conservatives and Reformists
- Patriots.eu, Patriots for Europe
- Europe of Sovereign Nations, Europe of Sovereign Nations

== See also ==
- Traditionalist conservatism
- Paleoconservatism
- Right-wing populism
- Souverainism
- State nationalism
- Trumpism
- European Conservatives and Reformists Party
- European Alliance for Freedom
- Europe of Nations and Freedom
- Patriots.eu
