= The Israel Project =

United States-based non-profit organization

- Founded: 2002; 24 years ago
- Founder: Jennifer Laszlo Mizrahi
- Type: 501(c)(3) non-profit, non-government organization
- Purpose: Press
- Location(s): Jerusalem and Washington, DC
- Method: Education
- Leader: Josh Block
- Website: www.theisraelproject.org

The Israel Project (TIP) was a US-based non-profit, non-government organization. According to TIP, it was not affiliated with any government.

TIP had offices in the United States and Israel, and regularly hosted press briefings featuring Israeli spokespeople and analysts.

== History ==
The Israel Project (TIP) was a nonpartisan educational group.

TIP was founded by philanthropist Jennifer Laszlo Mizrahi in 2003 in the wake of negative press Israel endured after the launch of the Second Intifada. Mizrahi served as president until 2012. Initially started to change US and European perceptions of Israel, it had worked in English, French, German, Spanish, Russian, Arabic, and Chinese to reach a global audience. However, from the end of 2012, TIP decided to shut down its 'Global Affairs' unit to focus more on social media outreach and perceptions in both the U.S. and Israel. TIP operated offices in Washington, D.C., and Jerusalem.

TIP was the first Jewish or pro-Israel group to host Palestinian Prime Minister Salam Fayyad in the United States.

Josh Block became CEO and President in 2012. Block was previously press secretary on Bill Clinton's 1996 presidential campaign and director of strategic communications at the American Israel Public Affairs Committee (AIPAC). Block took a more pugnacious approach than Mizrahi and focused the organization more on U.S. advocacy. During his tenure, TIP lobbied for anti-BDS laws. Block resigned in July 2019, citing the difficulties of fundraising for a nonprofit group in a polarized era. The group faced declining donations, from $8.7 million in 2015 to $5 million in 2016.

In July 2019, Haaretz reported that TIP could soon cease to exist due to a funding crisis. A month later, its offices in both Jerusalem and Washington were closed, with Vice President Lion Weintraub citing polarization among Zionists as the reason. A former senior staffer attributed the group's declining support was due to its nonpartisan stance and that the organization's "apolitical bipartisan middle line" was a victim of polarization in the pro-Israel camp.

== Activities ==
=== Press information ===
TIP enagaged with the media and public institutions on Israel issues, initially emphasizing outreach to media outlets perceived as hostile to Israel. It offered reporters backgrounders, tours of Israel, and access to Israeli officials. It also used polling to test language, including for Israeli governments.

TIP conducted polling and public opinion research with US focus groups and advised Israeli experts and political leaders on the most effective factual ways to present their views to US audiences: "We share [our] information with all the political leaders across the political spectrum because they're the ones being interviewed on television" TIP also provided information to journalists by offering background material, press conferences, and one-on-one interviews with these experts and political figures, such as Shimon Peres. TIP has supplied information for thousands of news stories around the world, as part of their "pro-Israel media advocacy" efforts. TIP also bought commercial time to air pro-Israel advertising on CNN, MSNBC, Fox News and other cable networks.

TIP's president and CEO, Josh Block, a former official in the Clinton Administration and spokesman for AIPAC, published an op-ed in 2016 critical of the "increasingly isolationist wing of the Democratic party", which he called "neo-progs".

=== Publications ===
During Block's tenure, TIP launched TheTower.org, a publishing platform, and The Tower magazine, a long-form online magazine published monthly. David Hazony was editor-in-chief of the publications.

The Tower Magazine was established in 2013. Founding editor-in-chief David Hazony served until leaving in 2017. In 2013, The Forward described TIP under Block's predecessor as having had a reputation as "Israel’s most effective nongovernmental public relations agency." Mark Dubowitz, the CEO of think tank Foundation for Defense of Democracies, described The Israel Project's publications, of which The Tower Magazine was one, as "unique and credible."

=== 2007 Iran Focus Group ===
A participant in a 2007 focus group commissioned by TIP reported that she had been "called in for what seemed an unusual assignment: to help test-market language that could be used to sell military action against Iran to the American public". The final question in the study was reportedly "How would you feel if George Bush, Hillary Clinton, or Israel bombed Iran"? TIP founder, Mizrahi, said that her group had commissioned the focus group and had "shared information" produced by the focus group with Freedom's Watch. She claimed that the focus group was designed to help TIP promote "our belief in pushing sanctions" against Iran. TIP repeatedly went on the record in support of sanctions which eventually were passed by the United Nations Security Council.

=== Global Language Dictionary ===
In 2009, TIP commissioned a study by pollster Frank Luntz to determine the best language to use to promote Israeli settlements to the American public. The study was marked, "Not for distribution or publication" and was leaked to Newsweek. It recommends being positive, framing the issue as being about peace not settlements, noting that religious, ownership and "scapegoat" arguments failed to sway listeners and that Arab housing is being demolished in East Jerusalem because it fails to meet the building code.

== Reception ==
Critics such as J Street describe the advice as "If you get a question about settlements, change the subject. If pressed, say stopping settlements is 'a kind of ethnic cleansing'." J Street sent a mailing to their organization asking their members to send letters to TIP asking them to "remove pro-settlement fear-mongering talking points from The Israel Project's materials".

An op-ed by Matthew Duss, a National Security reporter of the ThinkProgress blog, in The Jewish Daily Forward said several groups, including the Israel Project, "seem to exist for no other reason than to spotlight the very worst aspects of Muslim societies."
