= Lewis A. Sanders =

American businessman

- Education: Columbia University
- Occupation: Investor
- Known for: former chairman and CEO of AllianceBernstein
- Spouse: Alice

Lewis A. "Lew" Sanders is an American investment manager, who is the founder, CEO and Co-CIO of Sanders Capital, a value-oriented investment manager serving institutional and high-net-worth clients. Formerly, he was the Chairman of the Board and Chief Executive Officer of AllianceBernstein. He left this position in December, 2008.

Sanders became AllianceBernstein's Chairman in January, 2005; he became CEO in July, 2003. He had been Vice Chairman and CIO since October, 2000.

Before the acquisition of Sanford C. Bernstein & Co., Inc. by Alliance Capital in October, 2000, Sanders served for seven years as CEO of Sanford C. Bernstein. In his 32 years at Sanford C. Bernstein, he also served as president and Chief Operating Officer, with senior responsibility for all research and investment management operations (1981–1993); Executive Vice President (1979–1981); and Research Director (1972–1981). Sanders joined Bernstein in 1968 as a Research Analyst, establishing credentials that would lead to his being named to the Institutional Investor All-America Research team four times. As noted in his BusinessWeek executive profile, during his 32-year tenure at Bernstein, "More than any other individual, he shaped the Bernstein approach to in-depth fundamental research and to disciplined, value investing implemented on a centralized basis."

Before joining Bernstein, Sanders worked at Oppenheimer & Co for two years as a research assistant. He holds a BS in operations research from Columbia University and a CFA designation. Sanders serves as a trustee of The Rockefeller University board and on the board of Memorial Sloan Kettering Cancer Center.
