= National Conservatism Conference =

Right-wing political conference

- Frequency: Annual
- Inaugurated: 2019; 7 years ago
- Most recent: September 2–4, 2025
- Organizer: Edmund Burke Foundation
- Website: nationalconservatism.org

The National Conservatism Conference (NatCon) is a conference dedicated to the ideology of national conservatism. It is run by the Edmund Burke Foundation, a Washington D.C. based think-tank led by Yoram Hazony.

== History ==
The conferences developed between May 2019 and February 2020 when they were held in London, Washington, and Rome. Subsequent conferences were held in Orlando (2021), Brussels (2022), Miami (2022), London (2023) and Brussels (2024). Speakers billed to appear included Tucker Carlson, Josh Hawley, JD Vance, Giorgia Meloni, Marco Rubio, Peter Thiel, Kevin Roberts, the British MP Daniel Kawczynski, Florida Governor Ron DeSantis, Jonathan Isaac and the Hungarian prime minister Viktor Orbán.

== 2023 conference ==
In 2023, the National Conservatism Conference was held in the Emmanuel Centre in London, attracting widespread media attention. Speakers included the British Home Secretary Suella Braverman, Conservative government ministers Michael Gove and Jacob Rees-Mogg and the historian David Starkey. In Starkey's speech, he spoke about the “symbolic destruction of white culture.” Head teacher Katharine Birbalsingh in her speech placed schools at the forefront of the fight for conservative values and culture.

In her speech, Braverman stated that uncontrolled immigration threatened the country's "national character", and that Britons should be trained to do the jobs where immigrants are currently employed. She also expressed opposition to what she referred to as "radical gender ideology".

The MP Miriam Cates was criticised for her use of the term "cultural Marxism" in her speech. The journalist Douglas Murray was criticised for saying that he could "see no reason why every other country in the world should be prevented from feeling pride in itself because the Germans mucked up twice in a century".

During his speech at the conference, Jacob Rees-Mogg stated that the Elections Act 2022 was an attempt at gerrymandering that backfired.

== 2024 conference ==
The 2024 conference, held at the Claridge event space in Brussels, made headlines for being shut down by the Belgian police on April 16 following an order by district Mayor Emir Kir. Kir cited public safety as a concern. Two other Brussels-area venues had previously backed out of hosting the conference due to pressure from local mayors. Police barricaded the entrance and allowed participants to leave, but did not let anyone enter; the event partially took place with those already in the building. Scheduled speakers included Prime Minister of Hungary Viktor Orbán, British politicians Suella Braverman and Nigel Farage, and French politician Eric Zemmour. Prime Minister of Belgium Alexander De Croo condemned the shutting-down of the event, calling police's actions "unacceptable" and in violation of free speech protections in the Belgian Constitution. A spokesperson for United Kingdom Prime Minister Rishi Sunak called the decision "extremely disturbing". Orbán and Farage compared the shutting-down of the conference to the actions of communists.

The conference resumed on April 17, after the Council of State overturned the decision to shut it down. The Council ruled that there was no evidence of a threat to public order from the conference itself, and that the shutdown seemed to have been based on the reactions its opponents might have.

On the second day of the conference Hungarian Prime Minister Viktor Orbán called for a change of leadership in Brussels as he criticised the European Union’s policies on migration and Ukraine.
