= Tikvah Fund =

Politically conservative Jewish-American organization

- Established: 1992; 34 years ago
- Type: Nonprofit
- Headquarters: 165 East 56th Street
- Location: New York City, New York, United States
- Chairman: Elliott Abrams
- Key people: Zalman Bernstein
- Subsidiaries: Herut Center for Israeli Liberty (Israel)
- Website: tikvah.org

The Tikvah Fund (Hebrew: קרן תקווה) is an American politically conservative nonprofit charitable foundation whose stated mission is to promote Jewish thought and ideas.

== Activities ==
As of 2011, the Tikvah Fund held assets worth more than $162 million. That year, it provided a four-year $12.5 million grant to the Shalem Center to form an American-style liberal arts university in Israel, now Shalem College. The fund had supported the Shalem Center for the previous decade as well.

The Tikvah Fund has funded several publications, including Commentary, Mosaic and its predecessor Jewish Ideas Daily, the Jewish Review of Books, and Mida. Shalem Center also sponsored neo-conservative magazine Azure and the Fund was behind academic journals Hebraic Political Studies and Toronto Journal of Jewish Thought.

The Fund also organizes the Jewish Leadership Conference, a politically conservative Jewish conference. Invitees in 2022 included Mike Pompeo, who served as Secretary of State under Donald Trump, former Israeli Ambassador to the United States Ron Dermer, and Governor of Florida Ron DeSantis. Picketers attended to oppose DeSantis' speech.

It runs a fellowship programme named after Charles Krauthammer which is awarded to aspiring writers, journalists, scholars, and policy analysts.

In September 2025, despite mass cancellations of other grants related to Jewish studies by DOGE, the Tikvah Fund was awarded $10.5 million by the National Endowment for the Humanities "to combat antisemitism". It was the largest single grant in NEH history. In March 2026, a federal judge ruled in a lawsuit by the ACLS, AHA, and MLA that the grant cancellations were unconstitutional. In the process of the lawsuit, it was found that acting NEH chair Michael Patrick McDonald proactively solicited Tikvah for the grant application. The application was voted down by the NEH's outside scholarly council, but McDonald intervened against standard procedure to directly approve the grant.

In September 2026, Haaretz published an investigation into Tikvah's Herut Center for Israeli Liberty, established as "the latest incarnation of the Jewish-American Tikvah Fund's operations in Israel".

== Leadership ==
Roger Hertog (director of Alliance Capital Management) was chairman of the Tikvah Fund in 2011. Neal Kozodoy was senior director as of 2010. As of 2022, Eric Cohen was chief executive and Elliott Abrams was chairman.
