= Frank Luntz =

American political consultant, author, and pollster (born 1962)

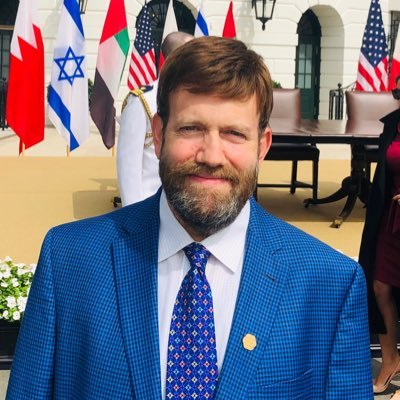
- Luntz in 2020
- Born: Frank Ian Luntz; February 23, 1962 (age 64); West Hartford, Connecticut, U.S.
- Education: University of Pennsylvania (BA); Trinity College, Oxford (DPhil)
- Occupations: Republican Party strategist, communication consultant, and political pollster
- Political party: Republican
- Website: www.filuntz.com

Frank Ian Luntz (born February 23, 1962) is an American political and communications consultant and pollster. His work has included developing talking points and other messaging for Republican causes, assistance with messaging for Newt Gingrich's Contract with America, and public relations support for The Israel Project. He is a former climate denier and has advocated use of vocabulary crafted to produce a desired effect, including use of the term death tax instead of estate tax, and climate change instead of global warming.

Luntz has frequently contributed as a commentator and analyst to Fox News and CBS News and to CNN since 2021. He has run focus groups on Fox News and CBS News during and after presidential debates. Luntz describes his specialty as "testing language and finding words that will help his clients sell their product or turn public opinion on an issue or a candidate." He is also an author of business books dealing with communication strategies and public opinion.

== Early life and education ==
Luntz was born and raised in West Hartford, Connecticut, the son of Phyllys (née Kelmenson) and Lester Luntz, who together wrote the first American forensic dentistry textbook. His family is Jewish. He graduated from Hall High School and earned a Bachelor of Arts degree in history and political science from the University of Pennsylvania. Funded by the Thouron Award, Luntz received a doctorate in politics from Trinity College, Oxford where he was a contemporary of future British Prime Minister Boris Johnson. Luntz's doctoral thesis formed the basis for his first book, Candidates, Consultants, and Campaigns: The Style and Substance of American Electioneering. published in 1988.

== Career ==
Luntz has appeared as a consultant or panel member on a number of television news shows, including The Colbert Report, Capital Gang, Good Morning America, Hannity, Hardball with Chris Matthews, Meet the Press, PBS NewsHour, Nightline, The O'Reilly Factor, Real Time with Bill Maher, and The Today Show. He has written op-eds for publications such as The Financial Times, The Los Angeles Times, The New York Times, The Wall Street Journal, and The Washington Post. In addition to his work in the United States, Luntz also provides analysis for British news programmes such as Newsnight.

He was an adjunct professor at the University of Pennsylvania from 1989 until 1996 and also taught at George Washington University and Harvard University as well as New York University Abu Dhabi campus for January terms.

== Health issues ==
Luntz has experienced multiple strokes, which he has openly discussed in several interviews. The first occurred on January 10, 2020, followed by a second on April 17, 2023. He has stated that he believes that stress over not speaking out more forcefully against President Donald Trump played a role in the life-threatening health events he experienced.

== Use of language ==
Luntz frequently tests word and phrase choices using focus groups and interviews. His stated purpose in this is the goal of causing audiences to react based on emotion:

"80 percent of our life is emotion, and only 20 percent is intellect. I am much more interested in how you feel than how you think. ... If I respond to you quietly, the viewer at home is going to have a different reaction than if I respond to you with emotion and with passion and I wave my arms around. Somebody like this is an intellectual; somebody like this is a freak."

In an article in The New Yorker, Luntz said:

The way my words are created is by taking the words of others.... I've moderated an average of a hundred plus focus groups a year over five years... I show them language that I've created. Then I leave a line for them to create language for me.

In a 2007 interview on Fresh Air with Terry Gross, Luntz argued that the term "Orwellian" could be considered in a positive sense, saying that if one reads George Orwell's essay Politics and the English Language, "To be 'Orwellian' is to speak with absolute clarity, to be succinct, to explain what the event is, to talk about what triggers something happening… and to do so without any pejorative whatsoever." Luntz suggested that Orwell would not have approved of many of the uses of the term, given that his essay derides the use of cliché and dying metaphors.

Luntz's description of his job revolves around exploiting the emotional content of language. "It's all emotion. But there's nothing wrong with emotion. When we are in love, we are not rational; we are emotional. ... my job is to look for the words that trigger the emotion. ... We know that words and emotion together are the most powerful force known to mankind."

Additionally in his 2007 interview on Fresh Air, Luntz discussed his use of the term "energy exploration" to refer to oil drilling. His research on the matter involved showing people a picture of current oil drilling and asking if in the picture it "looks like exploration or drilling." He said that 90 percent of the people he spoke to said it looked like exploring. "Therefore I'd argue that it is a more appropriate way to communicate." He went on to say, "if the public says after looking at the pictures, that doesn't look like my definition of drilling—it looks like my definition of exploring—then don't you think we should be calling it what people see it to be, rather than adding a political aspect to it all?" Terry Gross responded, "Should we be calling it what it actually is, as opposed to what somebody thinks it might be? The difference between exploration and actually getting out the oil—they're two different things, aren't they?"

James L. Martin, chairman of the conservative 60 Plus Association, described Luntz's role as being that of pollster and popularizer of the phrase "death tax."

Martin gained an important ally in GOP pollster Frank Luntz, whose polling revealed that 'death tax' sparked voter resentment in a way that 'inheritance tax' and 'estate tax' couldn't match. After all, who wouldn't be opposed to a 'tax on death'? Luntz shared his findings with Republicans and included the phrase in the GOP's Contract with America. Luntz went so far as to recommend in a memo to GOP lawmakers that they stage press conferences 'at your local mortuary' to dramatize the issue. 'I believe this backdrop will clearly resonate with your constituents,' he wrote. 'Death is something the American people understand.' Apparently, he's right. Spurred by Luntz, Republicans have employed the term 'death tax' so aggressively that it has entered the popular lexicon. Nonpartisan venues like newspapers and magazines have begun to use it in a neutral context—a coup for abolitionists like Martin.

In a confidential memo to the Republican party, Luntz is credited with advising the Bush administration that the phrase "global warming" should be abandoned in favour of "climate change", which he called a "less frightening" phrase than the former.

== Publications ==
Luntz is the author of the 2007 New York Times Best Seller, Words That Work: It's Not What You Say, It's What People Hear. His second book, What Americans Really Want ... Really: The Truth About Our Hopes, Dreams and Fears, climbed to #6 on the New York Times Business Best Sellers list. In March 2011, Luntz released his book, Win: The Key Principles to Take Your Business From Ordinary to Extraordinary.

== Work ==
=== U.S. politics, 1990s ===
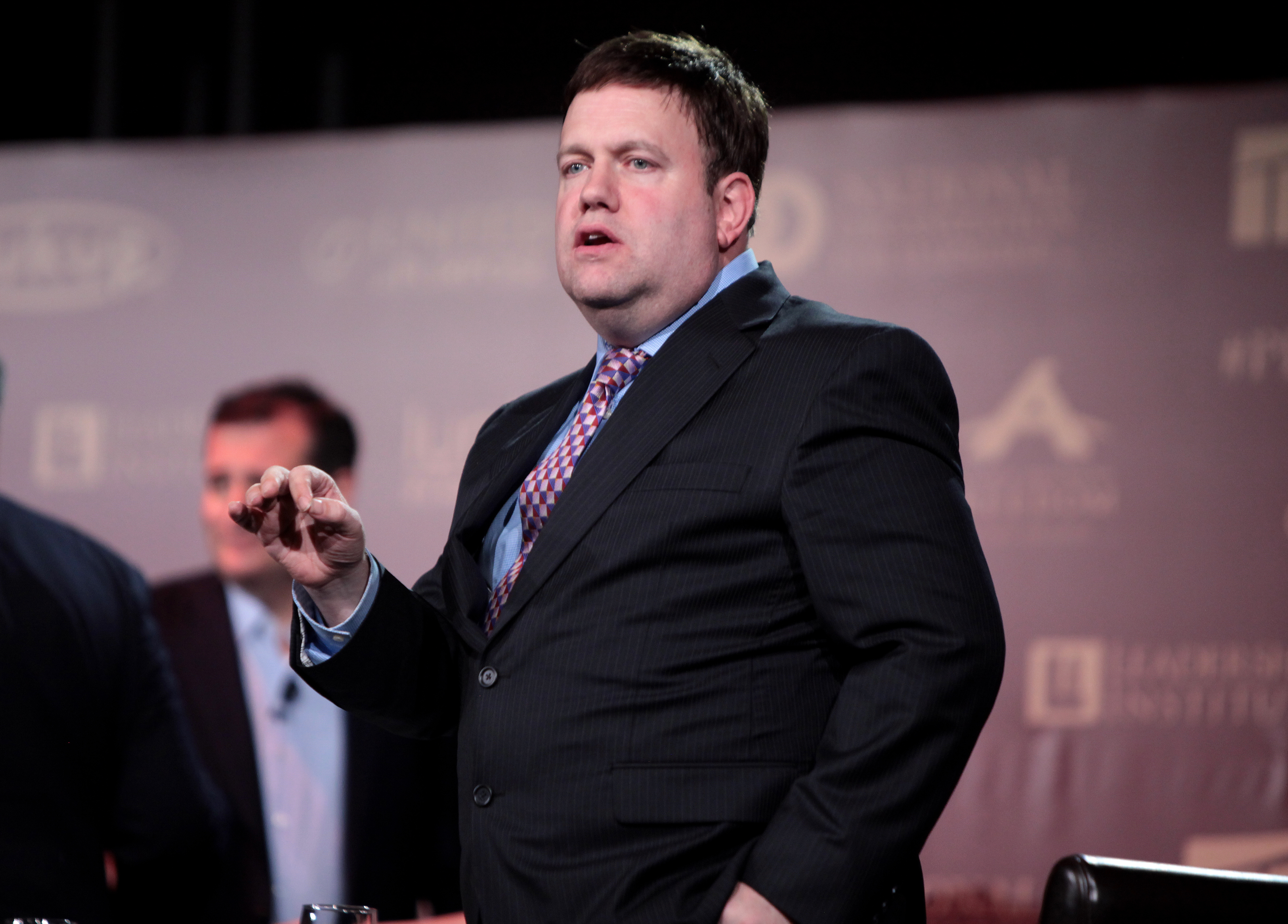
Luntz speaking at a Republican event in Des Moines, Iowa.

Luntz was Pat Buchanan's pollster during the 1992 U.S. Republican presidential primary, and later that year served as Ross Perot's pollster in the general election.

Luntz also served as Newt Gingrich's pollster in the mid-1990s for the Contract with America. During that time, he helped Gingrich produce a GOPAC memo that encouraged Republicans to "speak like Newt" by describing Democrats and Democratic policies using words such as "corrupt," "devour," "greed," "hypocrisy," "liberal," "sick," and "traitors."

In 1993 and 1997 Luntz served as pollster and strategist for the successful mayoral campaigns of Rudolph Giuliani in New York City.

=== Israel and the Palestinians ===
In December 2008 to January 2009, Luntz wrote a report titled "The Israel Project's 2009 Global Language Dictionary". It was commissioned by The Israel Project and meant to advise media spokespeople to use specific language that Luntz believed would create a more favorable impression of Israel in the United States and the rest of the international community. For example, when discussing the contours of a two-state solution, the report advised describing Palestinian negotiating points as "demands" because Americans dislike people who make "demands." The report was marked "not for distribution or publication", but it was leaked to Newsweek shortly after it was written.

=== Global warming ===
Although Luntz later tried to distance himself from the Bush administration policy, it was his idea that administration communications reframe global warming as climate change since "climate change" was thought to sound less severe. The term "climate change" was not altogether new, as in 1956, the physicist Gilbert Plass published a seminal study called "The Carbon Dioxide Theory of Climatic Change", and in 1978 the journal Climatic Change debuted. Luntz has since said that he is not responsible for what the Bush administration did after that time. Though he now believes humans have contributed to global warming, he maintains that the science was in fact incomplete, and his recommendation sound, at the time he made it.

In a 2002 memo to President George W. Bush titled "The Environment: A Cleaner, Safer, Healthier America", obtained by the Environmental Working Group, Luntz wrote: "The scientific debate is closing [against us] ... but not yet closed. There is still a window of opportunity to challenge the science. ... Voters believe that there is no consensus about global warming within the scientific community. Should the public come to believe that the scientific issues are settled, their views about global warming will change accordingly. Therefore, you need to continue to make the lack of scientific certainty a primary issue in the debate, and defer to scientists and other experts in the field."

In 2010, Luntz announced new research that shows the American people are eager for Congress to act on climate legislation that would promote US energy independence and a healthier environment. "Americans want their leaders to act on climate change—but not necessarily for the reasons you think," Luntz said. "A clear majority of Americans believe climate change is happening. This is true of McCain voters and Obama voters alike. And even those that don't still believe it is essential for America to pursue policies that promote energy independence and a cleaner, healthier environment." In reference to recent political events, Luntz added: "People are much more interested in seeing solutions than watching yet another partisan political argument."

On July 25, 2019, Luntz spoke in front of the United States House Select Committee on the Climate Crisis where he shared his advice to people pushing for action on the climate crisis. Furthermore, he stated that "I'm here before you to say that I was wrong in 2001", "That was a lifetime ago", and "I've changed." He promised to help the Democrats on the climate committee, provided that they put "policies ahead of politics" and commit to nonpartisan solutions. He had his change of heart after a wildfire, the Skirball Fire, threatened and forced him to evacuate his home in 2017.

=== 2005 UK Conservative leadership election ===
In 2005, Luntz conducted a focus group broadcast on the Conservative leadership race on the BBC current affairs show Newsnight. The focus group's overwhelmingly positive reaction to David Cameron was seen by many as crucial in making him the favorite in a crowded field. Cameron was the eventual victor. In March 2007, Newsnight invited him back to gauge comparative opinions on Cameron, Gordon Brown and Sir Menzies Campbell in the city of Birmingham.

=== 2007 Irish general elections ===
Luntz led a focus group telecast with the Irish state broadcaster RTÉ to gather the opinions of the Irish people before the May 24, 2007, general elections. RTÉ hoped to show viewers some of the campaign techniques the political parties were using without their knowledge.

=== 2007 Australian federal election ===
Another focus group of swing voters was analysed by Luntz in the lead-up to the November 2007 poll between the ruling Coalition and the opposition Labor party. Luntz noted that, like the Irish scenario, the Coalition was well established, presiding over the country for 11 years and overseeing continued economic growth for much of that period; and that unlike the lead-up to the Irish elections, Australia had a stronger and more popular opposition leader in Kevin Rudd: "This is much closer to the Irish election where the leader just barely scraped in, Bertie Ahern, because the economy was so good. But the big difference there was the opposition leader was not as good as Kevin Rudd." Luntz was brought in to conduct his research in a collaborative effort by Sky News Australia and The Australian newspaper.

=== 2010 UK general election ===
During the 2010 UK general election, Luntz led focus groups during the Prime Ministerial debates between Gordon Brown, David Cameron and Nick Clegg, and also appeared on the BBC's Daily Politics.

Luntz predicted that the next election in 2015 would result in a hung parliament (it ultimately produced a Conservative majority government).

=== Gun control ===
In 2012, Luntz conducted a poll that found that sizable majorities of gun owners supported gun control measures such as mandatory criminal background checks, minimum age restrictions, and eligibility requirements for concealed weapon permits.

=== U.S. politics, 2010–2022 ===
==== Occupy Wall Street movement, 2011 ====
In November 2011, during the height of the Occupy Wall Street movement, Luntz had a meeting with the Republican Governors Association to discuss how to respond to the Occupy movement. He was quoted as saying, "I'm so scared of this anti-Wall Street effort. I'm frightened to death. They're having an impact on what the American people think of capitalism."

==== Depression and sale of LuntzGlobal, 2012–2014 ====
According to a 2014 article in The Atlantic, Luntz became frustrated with the contention and argumentation of voters after the 2012 presidential election and, at the time of the interview for the article, was in psychological turmoil: "Something in his psyche has broken, and he does not know if he can recover."

==== State of the Republican Party ====
In August 2020, Luntz was asked what the defining principles of the Republican Party were, to which he responded, "You know, I don't have a history of dodging questions. But I don't know how to answer that. There is no consistent philosophy. You can't say it's about making America great again at a time of Covid and economic distress and social unrest. It's just not credible."

==== Midterm election 2022 ====
On November 8, 2022, Luntz tweeted his prediction: "When the dust settles from the 2022 midterms, the GOP will have between 233–240 House seats – outdoing their total from 1994. Republicans also will take control of the Senate, but that won't be clear until Friday. Top issues for 2022 voters: 1. The economy 2. Inflation and rising prices 3. Crime... 6. Abortion... 10. Donald Trump. This year, Democrats ran on abortion and Trump while ignoring Americans' growing economic hardship." Instead, Republicans narrowly won control of the House, but failed to win control of the Senate.

== Controversies ==
=== Refusal to release poll data ===
In 1997, the American Association for Public Opinion Research, of which Luntz was not a member, criticized Luntz for refusing to release poll data to support his claimed results "because of client confidentiality". Diane Colasanto, who was president of the AAPOR at the time, said:

It is simply wanting to know, How many people did you question? What were the questions? We understand the need for confidentiality, but once a pollster makes results public, the information needs to be public. People need to be able to evaluate whether it was sound research.

In 2000 he was censured by the National Council on Public Polls "for allegedly mischaracterizing on MSNBC the results of focus groups he conducted during the [2000] Republican Convention." In September 2004, MSNBC dropped Luntz from its planned coverage of that year's presidential debate, saying "[W]e made a decision not to use focus groups as part of our debate coverage. This decision had nothing to do with Frank's past work or politics." Luntz disagreed, believing that MSNBC "buckled to political pressure" from activist David Brock.

=== 2010 "Lie of the Year" award ===
Luntz was awarded the 2010 PolitiFact Lie of the Year award for his promotion of the phrase 'government takeover' to refer to healthcare reform, starting in the spring of 2009. "'Takeovers are like coups,' Luntz wrote in a 28-page memo. 'They both lead to dictators and a loss of freedom.'" In an editorial response, the Wall Street Journal wrote that "PolitiFact's decree is part of a larger journalistic trend that seeks to recast all political debates as matters of lies, misinformation and 'facts,' rather than differences of world view or principles." The editors of PolitiFact announced "We have concluded it is inaccurate to call the plan a government takeover."

=== Leaked tape from the University of Pennsylvania ===
On April 25, 2013, The American Spectator, a conservative news outlet, published a scathing article about Luntz titled "The Problematic Frank Luntz's Stockholm Syndrome".

In fact, what Luntz has done is simply reveal the kind of thinking that goes on in the minds of too many on the right who, whether they realize it or not, have been intellectually and culturally bullied that there is some sort of 'right way'—'right' as in 'correct'—to think. Resulting in some conservatives who suffer from what might be called a political version of Stockholm Syndrome—where the captives identify with their captors.

The article was a response to an April 22, 2013 leaked recording of Luntz at the University of Pennsylvania, where he said conservative radio personalities (specifically Rush Limbaugh and Mark Levin) were being "problematic" and "destroying" Republicans' ability to connect with more voters, or even maintain a majority in the House of Representatives in the 2014 mid-term elections.

As part of his critique Luntz said:

And they get great ratings, and they drive the message, and it's really problematic. And this is not on the Democratic side. It's only on the Republican side. ... [Democrats have] got every other source of news on their side. And so that is a lot of what's driving it. If you take—Marco Rubio's getting his ass kicked. Who's my Rubio fan here? We talked about it. He's getting destroyed! By Mark Levin, by Rush Limbaugh, and a few others. He's trying to find a legitimate, long-term effective solution to immigration that isn't the traditional Republican approach, and talk radio is killing him. That's what's causing this thing underneath. And too many politicians in Washington are playing coy.

After the leak, Luntz announced that he would no longer fund a scholarship to the University of Pennsylvania. The scholarship, which was in his father's name, supported student trips to Washington, D.C.

== Bibliography ==
- Candidates, Consultants, and Campaigns: The Style and Substance of American Electioneering. New York: Blackwell, 1988.
- Words That Work: It's Not What You Say, It's What People Hear. New York: Hyperion, 2007.
- What Americans Really Want ... Really. New York: Hyperion, 2009.
- Win: The Key Principles to Take Your Business from Ordinary to Extraordinary. New York: Hyperion, 2011.
