= Herut Center for Israeli Liberty =

- המרכז לחרות ישראלית
- Key people: Amiad Cohen (CEO)
- Parent organization: Tikvah Fund

Herut Center for Israeli Liberty (Hebrew: המרכז לחרות ישראלית) is the Israeli arm of the Jewish-American Tikvah Fund, a conservative organization that advocates for the replacement of Israel's leaders, including training IDF officers from the far-right for positions in the security establishment. In April 2024 Herut leaders claimed to have separated from the Tikvah Fund.

Herut was founded and led by Amiad Cohen.

== Operations ==
In November 2024, the Herut Center sponsored an event featuring Douglas Murray and Ben Shapiro in Jerusalem at the Freedom of Zion Conference.

=== Argaman Institute for Advanced Studies ===
Herut oversees the Argaman Institute for Advanced Studies, which is led by Ronen Shoval, a co-founder of right-wing Israeli activist group Im Tirtzu. The institute runs a variety of programming to prepare participants for political office, including the Churchill Program for Statecraft and Strategy. In September 2025, members of the Churchill Program published "The Paradigm Project: A New Strategic Agenda for Israel", a 274-page report advocating for a new vision for Israel's security.

=== Israel Law and Liberty Forum ===
Herut oversees the Israel Law and Liberty Forum, which trains legal professionals and judges to fill key judicial positions.
