= Zalman Bernstein =

American billionaire

Zalman Chaim Bernstein
- זלמן חיים ברנשטיין
- Born: Sanford Bernstein; 1926; Brooklyn, New York, United States
- Died: 1999 (age 72)
- Education: B.S. New York University; M.S. Harvard Business School
- Occupation: Investor
- Known for: Co-founder of Sanford C. Bernstein Company

Zalman Chaim Bernstein (Hebrew: זלמן חיים ברנשטיין; 1926–1999), originally known in his businesses as Sanford Bernstein, was an American billionaire businessman and philanthropist.

== Biography ==
Zalman Bernstein was born to a Jewish family in Brooklyn, New York, in 1926. At the age of eighteen, he joined the United States Navy and fought in the Second World War. He then received a bachelor's degree in economics from New York University, followed by a master's degree in economics from the Harvard Business School.

He worked as an economic advisor for the Marshall Plan. In 1967, he founded the investment management firm Sanford Bernstein. When he first founded Sanford C. Bernstein, his brother Paul P. Bernstein was his sole partner.

== Personal life ==
Bernstein married three times and had six children. His third wife was Mem Dryan Bernstein. He died of lymphoma in 1999.

In the 1980s, he became an Orthodox Jew and dropped his English name, Sanford, for his Hebrew one, Zalman. He attended Lincoln Square Synagogue and became a friend of its rabbi, Shlomo Riskin. In 1989, he immigrated to Israel. He also founded the Jewish organizations Avi Chai Foundation and Tikvah Fund.
