= AllianceBernstein =

American asset management firm

AllianceBernstein Holding L.P.

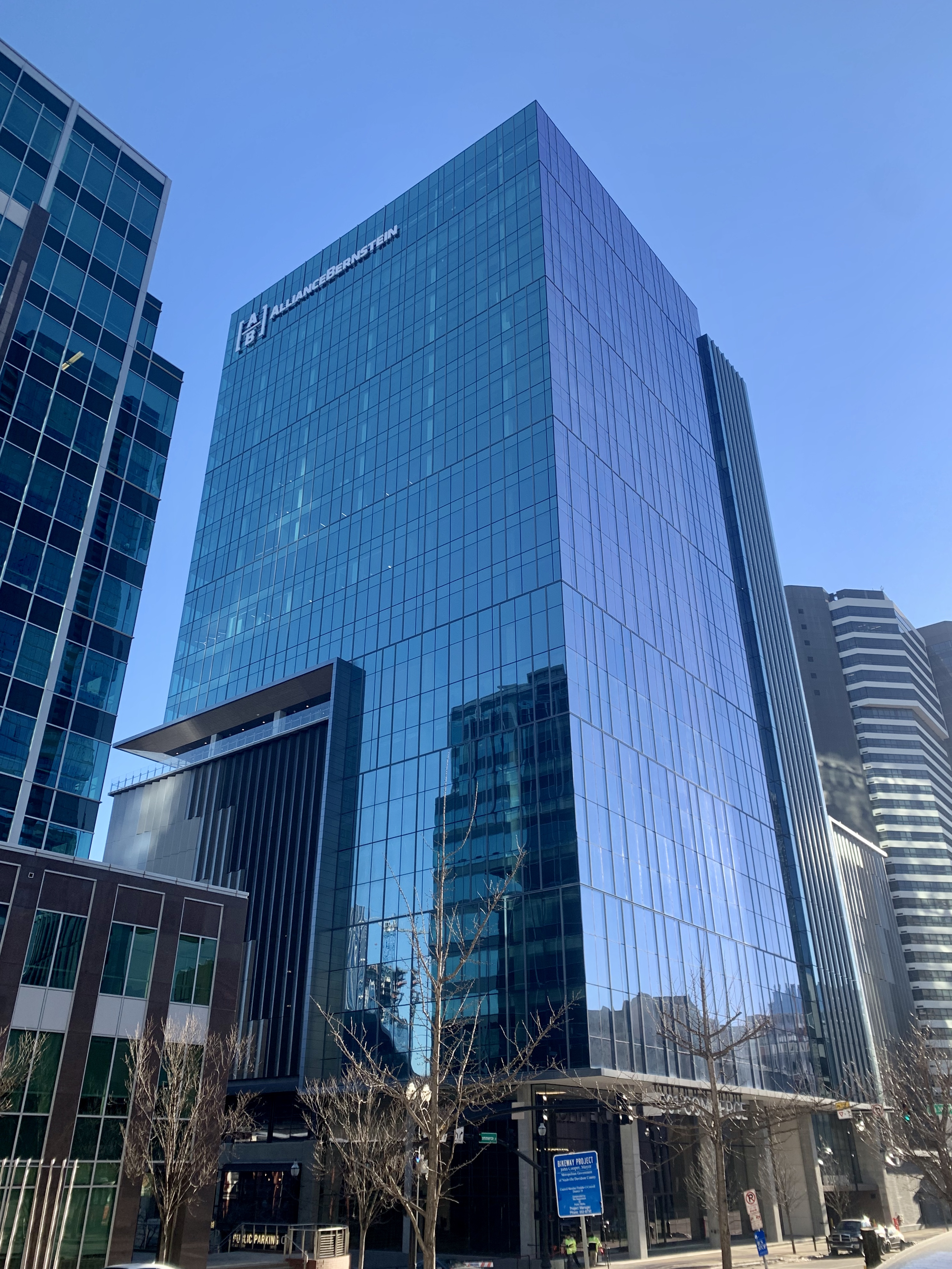
- Headquarters at 501 Commerce in Nashville, Tennessee
- Type: Public subsidiary
- Traded as: NYSE: AB
- Industry: Asset management
- Founded: 1967; 59 years ago
- Founders: Sanford C. Bernstein
- Headquarters: Nashville, Tennessee, U.S.
- Area served: Worldwide
- Key people: Seth Bernstein (CEO); Joan Lamm-Tennant (chair); Karl Sprules (COO); Tom Simeone (CFO)
- Products: Asset management, Mutual funds, Sell-side research, private wealth management
- AUM: ▲US$867 billion (2025)
- Number of employees: 4,856 (2025)
- Parent: Equitable Holdings (69%) (2025)
- Website: alliancebernstein.com

AllianceBernstein Holding L.P. (AB) is an American asset-management firm providing investment-management and research services worldwide to institutional, high-net-worth and retail investors.

AllianceBernstein's headquarters is located in Nashville, Tennessee; the firm also has locations throughout the world. It has approximately US$867 billion in assets under management as of 31 December 2025.

== History ==
=== Origins ===
AllianceBernstein traces its origins back to Sanford C. Bernstein and the founding of his eponymous private investment firm in 1967. Later in 1968, Bernstein partnered with Paul P. Bernstein, Shepard D. Osherow, Roger Hertog and Lewis A Sanders to form Sanford C. Bernstein & Company.

Alliance Capital was founded in 1971 when the investment-management department of Donaldson, Lufkin & Jenrette merged with the investment-advisory business of Moody's Investor Services.

=== 2000–2020 ===
In 2000, Alliance Capital acquired Sanford C. Bernstein. Alliance Capital's growth equity and corporate fixed-income investing, and its family of retail mutual funds, complemented Bernstein's value equity and tax-exempt fixed-income management and its private-client business.

In 2003, Alliance was charged with allowing improper trading in its mutual funds as part of the 2003 mutual fund scandal. Two executives were forced to leave the firm and Alliance settled with the SEC and NY attorney general Eliot Spitzer for a total of $600 million in restitution, penalties and reduced fees.

On January 20, 2015, AllianceBernstein announced a new brand name ("AB") and logo.

AllianceBernstein and Fidelity Investments took control of supermarket Winn-Dixie's parent company during the latter's 2018 bankruptcy.

In 2018, AllianceBernstein announced that it would move its global headquarters from New York City to Nashville, but still maintain a presence in New York City.

In 2019, AllianceBernstein partnered with Columbia University to provide training courses on sustainability and environmental sciences to its staff of investors.

In 2019, AllianceBernstein was flagged by the Boycott, Divestment and Sanctions movement as a subsidiary of AXA through which the French insurance group maintained indirect investments in Elbit Systems and Israeli banks despite a partial divestment by the parent company.

In June 2020, AllianceBernstein acquired investment-management firm AnchorPath for $400 million.

=== 2021–present ===
In April 2021, AllianceBernstein moved to its new headquarters in Nashville, Tennessee. In September 2021, AllianceBernstein gave a $100,000 gift to the Nashville-based Martha O'Bryan Center, a non-profit which helps individuals experiencing poverty, transform their lives through work, education, employment and fellowship.

In mid-August 2021, AllianceBernstein disclosed that it had entered a strategic partnership with LSV Advisors, LLC, in which AB would become the exclusive private wealth partner for LSV.

In March 2022, it was announced that AllianceBernstein had acquired the Minneapolis-headquartered CarVal Investors – a global private alternatives investment manager.

== See also ==
- Group Retirement Plan
- Individual Retirement Account
- Mutual fund
- Standard & Poor's
