= Robert Gordis =

American rabbi and author

Robert Gordis (February 6, 1908 – January 3, 1992) was an American leading conservative rabbi. He founded the first Conservative Jewish day school, served as President of the Rabbinical Assembly and the Synagogue Council of America, and was a professor at Jewish Theological Seminary of America from 1940 to 1992.

He wrote one of the first pamphlets explaining Conservative ideology in 1946, and in 1988 he chaired the Commission on the Philosophy of Conservative Judaism which produced the official statement of Conservative ideology "Emet Ve-Emunah".

Gordis was the founding editor in 1951 of the quarterly journal Judaism.

== Books ==
- Koheleth - The Man and His World: A Study of Ecclesiastes. Schocken Books. 1951.
- The Biblical Text in the Making: A Study of the Kethib-Qere. Ktav Publishing House. 1971. ISBN 0-87068-157-5.
- The Song of Songs and Lamentations: A Study, Modern Translation and Commentary. Ktav Publishing House. 1974. ISBN 0-87068-256-3.
- The Book of Job: Commentary, New Translation, Special Studies. Jewish Theological Seminary of America. 1978. ISBN 0-87334-003-5.
- Love & Sex: A Modern Jewish Perspective. Farrar, Straus and Giroux. 1978. ISBN 0-374-19252-9.

== Awards ==
- 1979: National Jewish Book Award in the Jewish Thought category for Love and Sex: A Modern Jewish Perspective
