= Shalem Center =

Former research institute in Jerusalem, Israel

Coordinates: 31°45′57.19″N 35°13′0.86″E

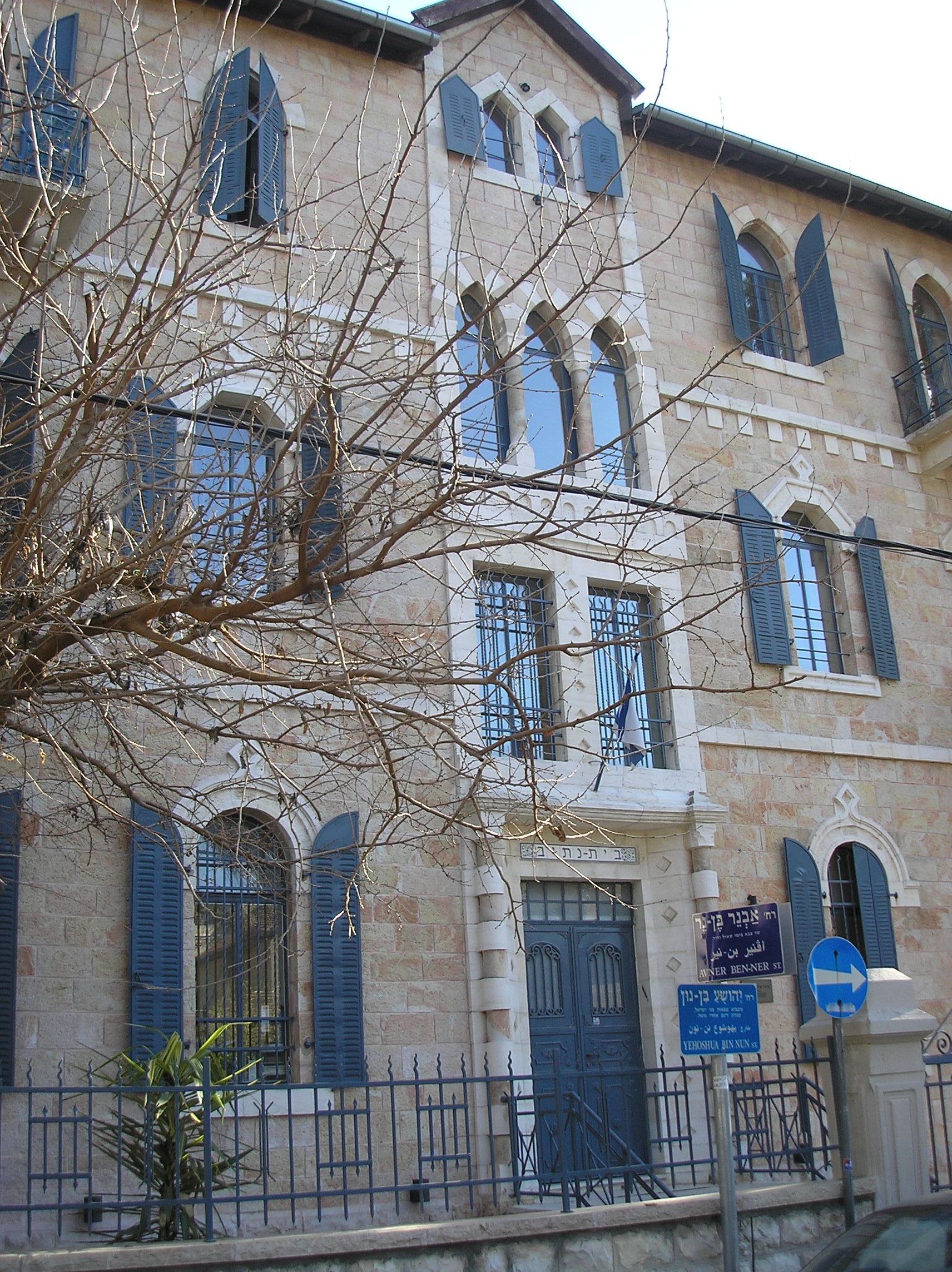
Mercaz Shalem, Jerusalem

The Shalem Center (Hebrew: מרכז שלם, Merkaz Shalem) was a Jerusalem research institute that supported academic work in the fields of philosophy, political theory, Jewish and Zionist history, Bible and Talmud, Middle East Studies, archaeology, economics, and strategic studies.

In its mission statement the Center wrote that "It seems that the entire Jewish people is suffering from an identity crisis", making its purpose to "provide a proper response to these processes". Due to the prestige the center was able to acquire, with time renowned academics of different political orientation have joined the ranks of its faculty.

The center became Shalem College in January 2013, when it received accreditation from the Council of Higher Education to offer Bachelor's degrees.

== History ==
The Shalem Center was established in 1994 by the young American Jewish scholar Yoram Hazony as a think tank "intended to confront what he saw as the dangers posed by post-Zionism", financed by conservative funders in the USA. Hazony had served as Benjamin Netanyahu's ghost writer and was one of his advisers.

In March 2009, the Shalem Center filed an application with the Council for Higher Education in Israel for the opening of an institution of higher learning that would be authorized to grant B.A. degrees in the liberal arts.

== Research fellows ==
Past fellows include Daniel Gordis, Asher Crispe, Yossi Klein Halevi, Martin Kramer, Ze'ev Maghen, Michael Oren, Natan Sharansky, and former Israel Defense Forces Chief of Staff Moshe Ya'alon. David Keyes worked at the center.

== Academic programs ==
Shalem's research programs supported scholarship in the areas of philosophy, political theory, Jewish and Zionist history, Bible and Talmud, Middle East Studies, archaeology, economics, and strategic studies. Shalem was also home to Shalem Press, one of Israel's leading academic publishing houses. The press specializes in the translation into Hebrew of classic and modern works of Western philosophy. The Center also conducted educational programs at the post-doctoral, undergraduate, and high-school levels for students from Israel and abroad.

== Publications ==
Between 1996 and 2011, the Center published the quarterly journal Azure: Ideas for the Jewish Nation, and between 2005 and 2009, it published Hebraic Political Studies a peer-reviewed scholarly journal. Azure (published in Hebrew as Techelet) was the largest-circulation general interest journal in Israel.

== Funding ==
The Center began to receive significant support from Sanford (Zalman) Bernstein and the Tikvah Fund in 1996. In 2007, the Sheldon Adelson Family Foundation announced a $4.5 million grant to enable the creation of the "Adelson Institute for Strategic Studies" at the Shalem Center, to be headed by Natan Sharansky. The Institute closed in 2009, with the departure of Sharansky to head the Jewish Agency. In 2010, the Center announced a $5 million gift from the Chicago-based Conduit Foundation, headed by long-time Shalem trustee David Messer, to seed the establishment of Shalem College. Other significant supporters of Shalem College include the Klarman Family Foundation of Boston, George and Pamela Rohr of New York, Harvey and Jayne Beker of New York, Larry and Judy Tanenbaum of Toronto, Warren and Debbie Kimel of Toronto, and the Ziegler Family Trust.
