= Azure (magazine) =

Quarterly Jewish magazine (1996–2012)

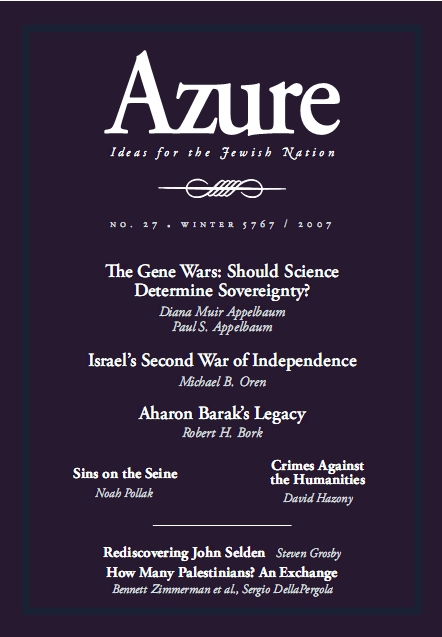
- Winter 2007 cover
- Editor: Assaf Sagiv
- Categories: Jewish affairs, Zionism, philosophy
- Frequency: Quarterly
- Founded: 1996
- Final issue Number: 2011; 46
- Company: The Shalem Center
- Country: Israel
- Based in: Jerusalem
- Language: English, Hebrew
- Website: http://www.azure.org.il
- ISSN: 0793-6664

Azure: Ideas for the Jewish Nation (Hebrew: תכלת, Techelet) was a quarterly magazine published 1996–2012 by the Shalem Center in Jerusalem, Israel. It published new writing on issues relating to Jewish thought and identity, Zionism, and the State of Israel. It was published in both Hebrew and English, allowing for the exchange of ideas between Israelis and Jews worldwide.

The magazine was established in 1996 and was originally published twice a year, but grew into a quarterly. The magazine's founding editor-in-chief was Ofir Haivry, followed by Daniel Polisar and David Hazony. Assaf Sagiv was editor-in-chief from 2007 to 2012.

The emphasis of the magazine was on strengthening Jewish and Zionist values. It was highly critical of post-national and radical trends in academia, opposed judicial activism in the Israeli legal system, and supported free-market reforms in the Israeli economy.

The publication ceased operations with the Autumn issue, no. 46, alerting its subscribers to this fact mid-2012. According to the letter sent to its subscribers, "circumstances and resources no longer enable [the magazine] to continue publication."
