= Vermeule =

Vermeule is a surname. Notable people with the surname include:

- Adrian Vermeule, American legal scholar
- Blakey Vermeule
- Cornelius Clarkson Vermeule I
- Cornelius Clarkson Vermeule II
- Cornelius Clarkson Vermeule III
- Emily Vermeule, American classical scholar and archaeologist
