= Trading of shareholder votes =

Trading corporate votes

Trading of shareholder votes is the practice of exchanging one's shareholder votes in corporate elections for cash or other forms of payment. Trades may involve multiple shareholders with varying interests in corporate matters, but may be of particular value to activist investors or a company's board of directors.

Several high-profile cases of vote trading have occurred in the United States, most notably Hewlett v. Hewlett-Packard Company in April 2002. In writing the ruling for that case, Chancellor William B. Chandler III of the Delaware Court of Chancery noted, "Shareholders are free to do whatever they want with their votes, including selling them to the highest bidder." Shareholder votes may be considered fundamentally different from political votes in the sense that political votes are often guaranteed as inalienable rights, while no such condition applies to shareholder votes. Similar to trading votes, proxy voting is when a voter appoints another person to vote on their behalf, the difference being whether an explicit economic value transaction accompanies the appointment or not.

== History ==
In Schreiber v. Carney (1982), the Delaware Court of Chancery concluded that "vote-buying was not illegal per se unless the object or purpose was to defraud or in some way disenfranchise the other stockholders."

A June 2005 article published in the Harvard Business Review by Luh Luh Lan and Loizos Leracleous titled Shareholder Votes for Sale explains how Carly Fiorina successfully used "vote buying" to get shareholders to approve Hewlett-Packard's merger with Compaq merger in 2002. While technique of buying votes is explicitly considered illegal in the political context, perhaps as a form of electoral fraud or bribery, "in the corporate arena, it is a legitimate, if controversial, strategic tool" according to Lan and Leracleous.

In July 2009, the Securities and Exchange Commission announced a settlement agreement with Perry Corporation regarding the hedge fund's failure to disclose its large stake in Mylan Laboratories. Activist investor Carl Icahn alleged that Perry had engaged in "vote buying" by purchasing shares in Mylan while using swap derivatives to reduce their economic exposure to changes in the stock price. The SEC did not address the "vote buying" argument in its $150,000 settlement with Perry, which admitted to no wrongdoing.

== Academic analysis ==
Various academics have commented about the value of shareholder votes and the concept of trading voting rights throughout the years. In the landmark paper Some Theoretical Aspects of Share Voting. An Essay in Honor of Adolf A. Berle, Dean of the George Mason University School of Law, Henry G. Manne, examines multiple aspects about shareholder voting and corporate structures. In this paper, Manne identifies four reasons why voting rights (and the power to affect corporate control) are valuable:

- The monopoly/market power one firm may achieve by controlling a competing firm
- The advantage from cost-saving technological efficiencies or other economies of sale which are unavailable to the single firm
- The desire for salaries and other perks normally associated with control of a corporation
- [Most importantly] The substantial gain that may be realized in the price of shares when the company receives improved management

Manne also states that the market for corporate votes serves two critical functions:

- It gives the advantage of someone else's information-gathering to all the shareholders willing to sell
- It causes the votes to move into the hands of those shareholders to whom the vote itself is most valuable, that is, those who know how to use it most profitably

He states that without a market for votes, many small shareholders might not have any idea of what their votes could actually be worth. Therefore, a market for votes may actually serve to inform shareholders (voters) of the value of their votes, and perhaps increase interest and engagement in the election versus what would otherwise exist.

The laissez-faire economist Milton Friedman introduced his shareholder theory of business ethics, known as the Friedman doctrine, in a 1970 essay for the New York Times. Friedman generally advocated for private property rights and specifically recommended that shareholders, rather than corporate executives or representatives, should be the ultimate decision makers for corporate matters. Friedman's argument essentially stated that those who own the corporation (i.e. the shareholders) should have the final say in the operations and conduct of the business, and can decide which social or environmental initiatives to pursue on their own. Friedman was a strong advocate of property rights and free markets, and perhaps would have supported the notion of a market for shareholder votes.

Robert Charles Clark, Harvard University Professor of Law, wrote a 1979 article titled Vote Buying and Corporate Law, in which he analyzes the benefits and dangers of vote buying in general. In general, Clark supports the notion of trading voting rights, unless someone objecting to the practice in a particular case can prove that:

- the trading of votes will present a substantial danger to that corporation or treat a specific subgroup shareholders unfairly, and
- those dangers and risks may outweigh any increase in the value of the corporation which results from the trading of its votes

In a 1998 lecture titled What Money Can't Buy: The Moral Limits of Markets, Harvard University professor Michael Sandel identifies three cases where he finds good reason that markets should be limited: military service, political voting, and the distribution of income and wealth. Sandel explores why vote buying in political elections (rather than in corporate matters) evokes moral hesitation. He concludes his analysis on the trading of political votes by claiming that democracy is not simply about aggregating the interests and preferences of voting constituents and translating them into policy. Sandel's argument is somewhat circular, as he states that citizenship in a democracy is something that money can't buy. While Sandel directs his moral argument to political voting in a democracy, the implication of his framework for voting in a corporation could be that being a shareholder is more than simply pursuing one's economic interest. In that regards, Sandel would advocate for stakeholder theory, although such a position may not necessarily support or oppose a market for shareholder voting rights.

University of Chicago Professor Eric Posner and co-author E. Glen Weyl discuss an alternative system of shareholder voting in their 2013 paper Quadratic Voting as Efficient Corporate Governance. Posner and Weyl criticize the current one-share-one-vote system as allowing large shareholders to exploit smaller ones. Under their proposed quadratic voting (QV) system, shareholders would not be entitled to voting rights along with their shares. Instead, a market for votes would be created where anyone could buy votes in a corporate election. Under QV, the price of the votes is set equal to the square of the number of votes already purchased. The proceeds paid by all the votes would be given to the corporate treasury, which would then redistribute the funds to all the shareholders (similar to a dividend), with certain limitations for shareholders who own more than 1% of the corporation (to prevent exploitation).

== Valuation ==
The pricing and value of shareholder votes has been analyzed by academics through a variety of methods. In particular, four methods have been used in academic research:

- The difference between voting shares and non-voting shares (dual-class approach).
- The difference between the price paid in a block-trade transaction and the subsequent price paid in a smaller transaction on exchanges (block-trade approach).
- The implied voting value obtained from option prices.
- The excess lending fee over voting events.

In The Source of Value of Voting Rights and Related Dividend Promises, Stephen Cox and Dianne Roden examine the difference in value between dual classes of shares in public company stock prices from 1984-1999. Pricing differentials may occur in different share classes as a result of differing voting rights and dividend rights to the owners, generally implying that shares with greater voting rights are worth more than those without such rights. Across the 98 firms analyzed, they found a mean price ratio of 1.077 of high-vote stock to low-vote stock. Cox and Roden identify several factors that contribute to the voting premium, such as:

- the presence of a takeover or control threat
- whether insiders hold controlling voting power or not
- whether the firm's recent performance has been poor or not

In a September 2009 article titled Mispricing of Dual-Class Shares: Profit Opportunities, Arbitrage, and Trading, Paul Schultz and Sophie Shive positively conclude that one could derive profits by employing a pairs trading approach for dual-class shares. In their paper, Schultz and Shive point out two examples of voting price discrepancies. From 1994-1997, Comcast voting stock exceeded its non-voting stock from 1-3%. In another case, the price of voting stock for Gray Television exceeded the price of non-voting shares by between 10-40% in 2002-2003. They explain that these discrepancies generally converge over time, and so one could profit by purchasing the under-valued stock while selling the over-valued stock.

== Marketplace ==
While the market for shareholder votes is immature, Shareholder Vote Exchange was created as “The World’s First Marketplace For Shareholder Voting Rights”. The marketplace utilizes an ascending-price auction for bidding on the aggregate number of listed votes for a particular shareholder meeting.
