= Adrian Vermeule =

American legal scholar (born 1968)

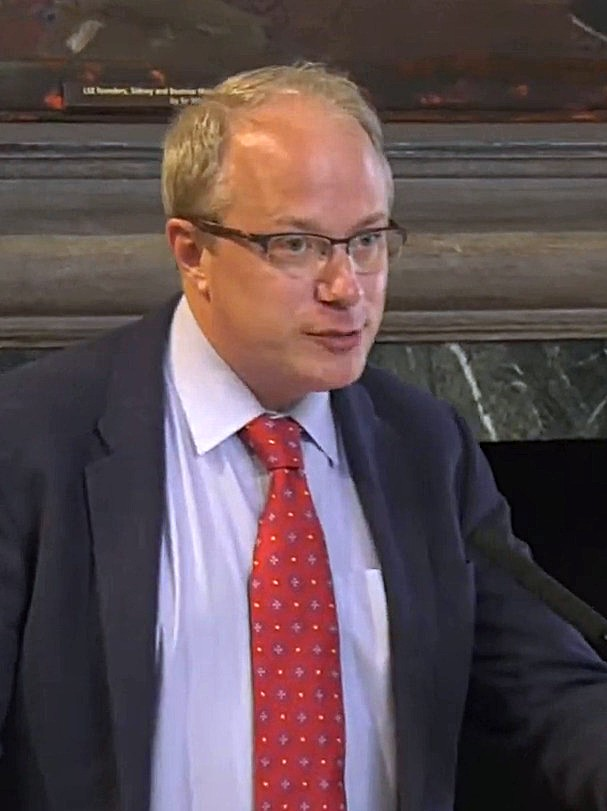
- Vermeule in 2018
- Born: Cornelius Adrian Comstock Vermeule; May 2, 1968 (age 58); Cambridge, Massachusetts, U.S.
- Spouse: Yun Soo
- Parents: Cornelius Vermeule (father); Emily Vermeule (mother)
- Relatives: Blakey Vermeule (sister)

Academic background
- Education: Harvard University (BA, JD)
- Influences: Aquinas; de Maistre; Newman; Schmitt; Sunstein

Academic work
- Discipline: Administrative law Constitutional law
- Institutions: University of Chicago; Harvard University
- Notable ideas: Common good constitutionalism
- Website: blogs.harvard.edu/adrianvermeule

Cornelius Adrian Comstock Vermeule (/vərˈmjuːl/, born May 2, 1968) is an American legal scholar who is the Ralph S. Tyler Professor of Constitutional Law at Harvard Law School. An expert on constitutional and administrative law, since 2016 he has voiced support for integralism. He has articulated this into his theory of common-good constitutionalism.

== Early life and education ==
Cornelius Adrian Comstock Vermeule was born on May 2, 1968, in Cambridge, Massachusetts. His father, Cornelius Clarkson Vermeule III, was a curator of ancient and classical art at the Museum of Fine Arts, Boston. His mother, Emily Vermeule, was a professor of philology and archaeology at Harvard University. Vermeule graduated from Harvard College in 1990 with a Bachelor of Arts, summa cum laude, in East Asian languages and civilizations. He then attended Harvard Law School, graduating in 1993 with a Juris Doctor, magna cum laude.

After graduating from law school, Vermeule was a law clerk to Judge David Sentelle of the U.S. Court of Appeals for the District of Columbia Circuit from 1993 to 1994 and to Justice Antonin Scalia of the U.S. Supreme Court from 1994 to 1995.

== Career ==
Vermeule joined the faculty of the University of Chicago Law School in 1998. Vermeule became professor of law at Harvard Law School in 2006, was named John H. Watson Professor of Law in 2008, and was named Ralph S. Tyler Professor of Constitutional Law in 2016. He was elected to the American Academy of Arts and Sciences in 2012 at the age of 43.

Vermeule's writings focus on constitutional law, administrative law, and the theory of institutional design. He has authored or co-authored nine books. He teaches administrative law, legislation, and constitutional law.

In 2015, Vermeule co-founded the book review magazine The New Rambler. Vermeule became a contributing editor to Compact in 2022.

In February 2020, Vermeule sparked a controversy when he used Twtter to post an image of 26 attendees at a conferences for political conservatives with the caption: “The very first group for the camps.” He later clarified the Tweet was intended as a joke describing how far left academics might want to imprison political conservatives in concentration camps if they had the power to do so. The Harvard Crimson wrote at the time: "The comment drew criticism from professors and Harvard alumni, who interpreted the line as a reference to Nazi concentration camps during the Holocaust."

On July 24, 2020, Vermeule was appointed to the Administrative Conference of the United States.

== Legal and political philosophy ==
=== Integralism ===
A convert to Catholicism, Vermeule has become an advocate of integralism, a form of modern legal and political thought originating in historically Catholic-dominant societies. Integralism advocates for a political and social order based on the primacy of the Catholic faith. Rather than electoral politics, the path to confessional political order in integralist theory is "strategic ralliement", or transformation of institutions and bureaucracies from within. Ralliement lays the groundwork for a realized integralist regime to succeed the liberal democratic order. The new state would "exercise coercion over baptized citizens in a manner different from non-baptized citizens".

=== Judicial interpretation ===
On judicial interpretation, Vermeule believes:

The central question is not "How, in principle, should a text be interpreted?" The question instead should be, "How should certain institutions, with their distinctive abilities and limitations, interpret certain texts?" My conclusions are that judges acting under uncertainty should strive, above all, to minimize the costs of mistaken decisions and the costs of decision making, and to maximize the predictability of their decisions.

Vermeule is a judicial review skeptic. Jonathan Siegel has written that Vermeule's approach to the interpretation of law:

eschews, and attempts to transcend, the main elements of the long-standing debates over methods that courts should use to interpret statutes and the Constitution ... he sees no need to resolve apparently burning questions such as whether courts are bound by what legislatures write, or by what legislatures intend ... For Vermeule, everything comes down to a simple but withering cost–benefit analysis.

In 2007, Vermeule said about the United States Supreme Court that it should stay away from controversial political matters, such as abortion laws and anti-sodomy statutes and defer to Congress, as the elected representatives of the people, except in extremely obvious cases. This would require both liberals and conservatives to step back and realize that the benefits of such a court would outweigh the drawbacks for both. Vermeule was thus suggesting "a kind of arms-control agreement, a tacit deal".

Vermeule believes that legal change can only come about through cultural improvements. In an interview in 2016 after his conversion to Catholicism, Vermeule said,

I put little stock or faith in the law. It is a tool that may be put to good uses or bad. In the long run it will be no better than the polity and culture in which it is embedded. If that culture sours and curdles; so will the law; indeed that process is well underway and its tempo is accelerating. Our hope lies elsewhere.

=== Common-good constitutionalism ===
In an article in The Atlantic in March 2020, Vermeule suggests that originalism – the idea that the meaning of the American Constitution was fixed at the time of its enactment, which has been the principal legal theory of conservative judges and legal scholars for the past 50 years, but which Vermeule now characterizes as merely "a useful rhetorical and political expedient" – has outlived its usefulness and needs to be replaced by what he calls "common-good constitutionalism".

Vermeule's concept of common-good constitutionalism is:

based on the principles that government helps direct persons, associations, and society generally toward the common good, and that strong rule in the interest of attaining the common good is entirely legitimate. ... This approach should take as its starting point substantive moral principles that conduce to the common good, principles that officials (including, but by no means limited to, judges) should read into the majestic generalities and ambiguities of the written Constitution. These principles include respect for the authority of rule and of rulers; respect for the hierarchies needed for society to function; solidarity within and among families, social groups, and workers' unions, trade associations, and professions; appropriate subsidiarity, or respect for the legitimate roles of public bodies and associations at all levels of government and society; and a candid willingness to "legislate morality" –indeed, a recognition that all legislation is necessarily founded on some substantive conception of morality, and that the promotion of morality is a core and legitimate function of authority. Such principles promote the common good and make for a just and well-ordered society.

Vermeule specified that common-good constitutionalism is "not tethered to particular written instruments of civil law or the will of the legislators who created them". However, the determination of the common good made by the legislators is instrumental insofar as it embodies the background principles of the natural law. In other words, while the legislative intent is not per se controlling, positive law always seeks to put into effect natural law principles, and the intended principles behind the positive law are controlling. In that vein, he also says that "officials (including, but by no means limited to, judges)" will need "a candid willingness to 'legislate morality'" in order to create a "just and well-ordered society."

The main aim of common-good constitutionalism:

is certainly not to maximize individual autonomy or to minimize the abuse of power (an incoherent goal in any event), but instead to ensure that the ruler has the power needed to rule well ... Just authority in rulers can be exercised for the good of subjects, if necessary even against the subjects' own perceptions of what is best for them — perceptions that may change over time anyway, as the law teaches, habituates, and re-forms them. Subjects will come to thank the ruler whose legal strictures, possibly experienced at first as coercive, encourage subjects to form more authentic desires for the individual and common goods, better habits, and beliefs that better track and promote communal well-being.

In a critique in New York, politics and economics writer Eric Levitz argued that this theory of jurisprudence "allows the religious right to impose its vision of the good on the American people, whether they like it or not." Garrett Epps, a professor of law at the University of Baltimore, also wrote a critique in The Atlantic, linking common-good constitutionalism to integralism and arguing that Vermeule's approach represents authoritarianism and objects "not [because] it is harmful and antihuman, but simply that, in the end, it is so banal.

=== Responses ===
Vermeule's common good constitutionalism has drawn a range of responses, both positive and negative. Legal scholar Richard H. Helmholz, in a review of Common Good Constitutionalism, described it as "a serious contribution to some of the most pressing legal debates of our times... Vermeule's book has the merit of providing some of the details about how such a change might occur. It also includes some marching orders." Jack Goldsmith praised Common Good Constitutionalism as "the most important book of American constitutional theory in many decades".

Legal scholar Conor Casey has criticized critics of common good constitutionalism as having fundamentally misunderstood it. According to Casey, common good constitutionalism "is entirely consistent with the natural law legal tradition and emphatically not an argument for authoritarianism unbound from legal and democratic constraint or concern for human rights".

According to Eric Levitz, the values Vermeule promotes are those of Catholicism and the Christian right. Law professor Randy E. Barnett characterizes Vermeule's essay as "an argument for the temporal power of the state to be subordinated to the spiritual power of the Church". Constitutional law professor Garrett Epps characterizes Vermeule as "an authentic Christian nationalist to whom the Constitution is only an obstacle". Vermeule's common-good constitutionalism argument is, according to Epps, really "authoritarian extremism" which "has absolutely nothing to do with the actual United States Constitution, and in many ways flatly contradicts it. ... In fact, the Constitution as such is not a binding text to Vermeule" since it must be, in Vermeule's words, "read into" in order to arrive at the results he prefers. In the end, Epps criticizes Vermeule's concept as a "banal" anti-constitutional theory akin to Falangism. Levitz notes that Vermeule received little support from conservatives for his arguments, although some did object to characterizing him as "authoritarian".

In a column in The Washington Post, libertarian columnist George F. Will described Vermeule's "common-good constitutionalism" as "Christian authoritarianism — muscular paternalism, with government enforcing social solidarity for religious reasons. This is the Constitution minus the Framers' purpose: a regime respectful of individuals' diverse notions of the life worth living." About Vermeule's and some other contemporary conservative views, Will goes on to say that "... American conservatism, when severed from the Enlightenment and its finest result, the American Founding, becomes spectacularly unreasonable and literally un-American."

Elliot Kaufman, writing in the conservative magazine National Review, has described Vermeule as a "reactionary" and an "illiberal" following in the footsteps of German Nazi thinker Carl Schmitt. In Kaufman's view, Vermeule's illiberalism is "dangerous". Law professor Rick Hills described Vermeule's recent writings as a kind of "anti-liberal chic", or "a really cheap way to signal one's willingness to offend without putting any specific cards on the table about one's own specific views about, say, the acceptability of locking up demonstrators who offend the regime in power".

Peter J. Wallison, who served as White House Counsel during the Reagan presidency, described Vermeule's book as "more an embarrassment than a legal masterpiece" and that "the political structure he devises is highly authoritarian, perhaps even totalitarian". Wallison complained that Vermeule "never successfully defines what he means by the common good or how it can be achieved" and for failing to understand the distinction between textualism and originalism.

== Personal life and views ==
Vermeule was raised as an Episcopalian, abandoning the denomination in college, but returning to it later in life. He announced his conversion to Catholicism in 2016. He said in an October 2016 interview that the logic behind his Catholic beliefs is inspired by John Henry Newman, and added:

Raised a Protestant, despite all my thrashing and twisting, I eventually couldn't help but believe that the apostolic succession through Peter as the designated leader and primus inter pares is in some logical or theological sense prior to everything else – including even Scripture, whose formation was guided and completed by the apostles and their successors, themselves inspired by the Holy Spirit.

Vermeule's son, Spencer, a Notre Dame sophomore was killed in an automobile accident on March 2, 2024.

== Scholarly works ==
=== Books ===
- Vermeule, Adrian (2006). Judging Under Uncertainty: An Institutional Theory of Legal Interpretation. Cambridge, Massachusetts: Harvard University Press.
- Vermeule, Adrian; Posner, Eric (2007). Terror in the Balance: Security, Liberty, and the Courts. Oxford: Oxford University Press.
- Vermeule, Adrian (2009). Law and the Limits of Reason. Oxford: Oxford University Press.
- Vermeule, Adrian; Posner, Eric (2010). The Executive Unbound: After the Madisonian Republic. Oxford: Oxford University Press.
- Vermeule, Adrian (2011). The System of the Constitution. Oxford: Oxford University Press.
- Vermeule, Adrian; Breyer, Stephen G.; Stewart, Richard B.; Sunstein, Cass R.; Herz, Michael (2011). Administrative Law and Regulatory Policy: Problems Text, and Cases (7th ed.). New York: Wolters Kluwer Law & Business. ISBN 9780735587441.
- Vermeule, Adrian (2014). The Constitution of Risk. Cambridge: Cambridge University Press.
- Sunstein, Cass R.; Vermeule, Adrian (2020). Law & Leviathan: Redeeming the Administrative State. Cambridge, Massachusetts: The Belknap Press of Harvard University Press.
- Vermeule, Adrian (February 2022). Common Good Constitutionalism: Recovering the Classical Legal Tradition. Medford, MA: Polity Press. ISBN 978-1509548873.

=== Selected articles ===
- Vermeule, Adrian (1997). "Saving Constructions". Georgetown Law Journal. 85 (6): 1945–78.
- — (1998). "Legislative History and the Limits of Judicial Competence: The Untold Story of Holy Trinity Church". Stanford Law Review. 50 (6): 1833–96. doi:10.2307/1229242. JSTOR 1229242.
- — (2000). "Interpretive Choice". New York University Law Review. 75 (1): 74–149.
- —; Posner, Eric A. (2002). "Interring the Nondelegation Doctrine". University of Chicago Law Review. 69 (4): 1721–62. doi:10.2307/1600617. JSTOR 1600617.
- —; Sunstein, Cass R. (2003). "Interpretation and Institutions". Michigan Law Review. 101 (4): 885–951. doi:10.2307/1290510. JSTOR 1290510.
- —; Sunstein, Cass R. (2005). "Is Capital Punishment Morally Required? Acts, Omissions, and Life-Life Tradeoffs" (PDF). Stanford Law Review. 58 (3): 703–50.
- —; Freeman, Jody (2008). "Massachusetts v. EPA: From Politics to Expertise". Supreme Court Review. 2007: 51–110. doi:10.1086/655170.
- — (2009). "Our Schmittian Administrative Law". Harvard Law Review. 122 (4): 1095–1150.
- —; Stephenson, Matthew C. (2009). "Chevron Has Only One Step". Virginia Law Review. 95 (3): 597–610. JSTOR 25478714.
- — (2013). "Conventions of Agency Independence". Columbia Law Review. 113 (5): 1163–1238. JSTOR 23479725.
- —; Sunstein, Cass R. (2018). "The Morality of Administrative Law". Harvard Law Review. 131 (7): 1924–78. JSTOR 44865917.

== See also ==
- List of law clerks for the ninth seat of the Supreme Court of the United States
