= Robin Paul Malloy =

American lawyer and academic

Robin Paul Malloy is the E.I. White Chair and Distinguished Professor of Law at Syracuse University.

== Career ==
Robin Malloy is the E.I. White Chair and Distinguished Professor of Law; Kauffman Professor of Entrepreneurship and Innovation; Director, Center on Property, Citizenship and Social Entrepreneurism; Professor of Economics, Maxwell School of Citizenship and Public Affairs at Syracuse University. He is also the founder of the Association for Law, Property and Society.

== Works ==
In his book, Law and the Market Economy, Eric Posner states in a review that Malloy "rejects the traditional 'view' of law and economics". In Malloy's book Law in a Market Context, reviewer Lee Anne Fennell states further that Malloy is a "critic of traditional law and economics".
