= Harberger Tax =

Property taxation model

The Harberger Tax, also known as Common Ownership Self-assessed Tax (COST), is a type of property tax that aims to improve societal welfare by optimising for both investment and allocative efficiency of private property. It proposes a new kind of "partial ownership", halfway between private ownership and common ownership. The tax is implemented by two mechanisms:

- Owners periodically self-assess their property and pay tax on its value.
- Others are able to purchase the property from the owner at the taxed price at any time, forcing a sale.

First proposed by American economist Arnold Harberger, it was further popularised in Glen Weyl and Eric Posner's book Radical Markets: Uprooting Capitalism and Democracy for a Just Society.

A similar mechanism was used for taxation of shipping in the Danish Sound Dues, which imposed a 1–2% ad valorem toll with the Crown allowed to purchase cargo for its declared value. A similar idea was proposed by Sun Yat-sen in 1905, where the government is the entity that can purchase the property from the landowners if the self-assessed price is too low.
