= Josh Hammer =

American political commentator and lawyer (born 1989)

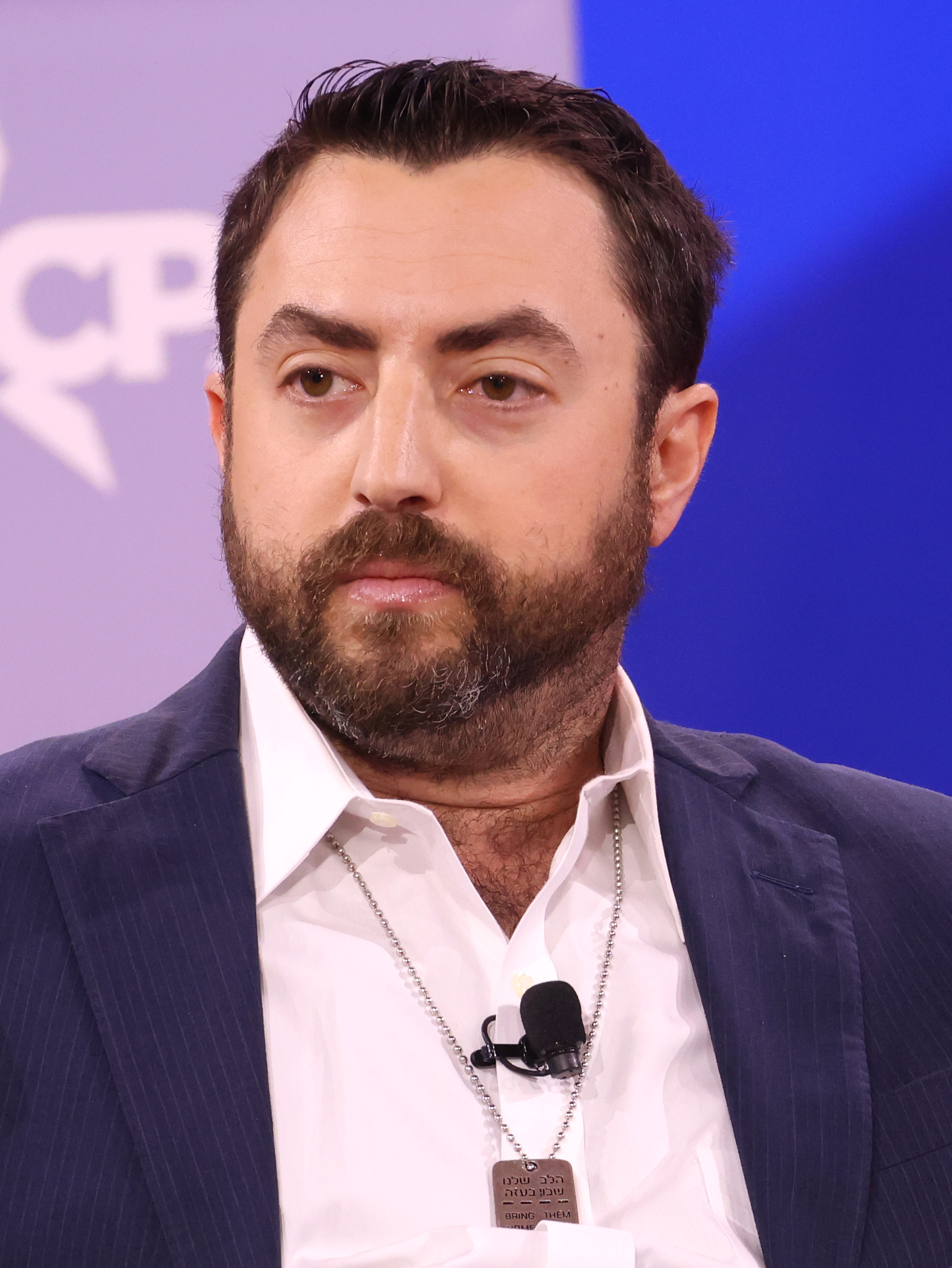
- Hammer in 2025
- Born: Joshua Benjamin Hammer; February 12, 1989 (age 37); Westchester County, New York, U.S.
- Education: Duke University (BS); University of Chicago (JD)
- Spouse: Shir Cohen (m. 2023)

Joshua Benjamin Hammer (born February 12, 1989) is an American conservative political commentator, attorney, and columnist. He is also the author of Israel and Civilization: The Fate of the Jewish Nation and the Destiny of the West. He is a syndicated columnist through Creators Syndicate. In January 2026, Hammer joined the David Horowitz Freedom Center as a Shillman Fellow. From 2020 to September 2026, he was an editor for Newsweek magazine, serving as senior editor for the latter half of his tenure.

== Early life and education ==
Hammer was born in Westchester County, New York, to a Jewish family.

Hammer graduated from Duke University in 2011 with a Bachelor of Science degree in economics. After graduating, he worked in anti-trust research. He later earned his J.D. degree from the University of Chicago Law School in 2016. In law school, he was active in the Federalist Society, and the Edmund Burke Society. He has also been a fellow with the Claremont Institute, and the James Wilson Institute.

== Career ==
After graduating from law school, Hammer worked for sixteen months at the Houston office of Kirkland & Ellis LLP. He then clerked for Judge James C. Ho on the U.S. Court of Appeals for the Fifth Circuit.

While establishing himself as an editor at The Daily Wire and contributor at TheBlaze, he also worked as of counsel at the First Liberty Institute.

Starting in 2020, Hammer joined Newsweek as opinion editor. He has since assumed the title of senior editor-at-large. He is also the host of The Josh Hammer Show, a Newsweek podcast and syndicated weekly radio show. Also in 2020, he joined Creators Syndicate as a syndicated columnist. In 2023, he was named a fellow at the Florida-based Palm Beach Freedom Institute.

His recent scholarship includes the article "Common Good Originalism", published in the Harvard Journal of Law and Public Policy, in which he attempts to theorize a "middle-ground position" and fusion of originalism and common good constitutionalism.

With the natural law scholar Hadley Arkes, Matthew Peterson, and Garrett Snedeker, Hammer co-authored, in 2021, the influential manifesto "A Better Originalism", arguing for "a bolder, more robust jurisprudence rooted in the principles and practices of American constitutionalism". Hammer has also contributed to the University of St. Thomas Law Journal.

He previously hosted America on Trial with Josh Hammer, a legal podcast primarily focused on the 2024 United States presidential election. Hammer remains a member of the bar in Texas, and serves as senior counsel for both the Article III Project and the Internet Accountability Project.

The Southern Poverty Law Center opined that the Newsweek opinion section under Hammer's tenure had "emerged as a hub for opinion pieces authored by radical right activists", noting its elevation of conspiracy theorists such as Jack Posobiec and Dinesh D'Souza, and its publication of conspiracy theories about COVID-19.

In December 2022, Hammer attended the annual gala for the New York Young Republican Club, along with noted far-right figures such as Posobiec, Steve Bannon, Marjorie Taylor Greene, and Peter Brimelow.

Hammer is the author of the book Israel and Civilization: The Fate of the Jewish Nation and the Destiny of the West, from Radius Book Group.

== Conservative activism ==
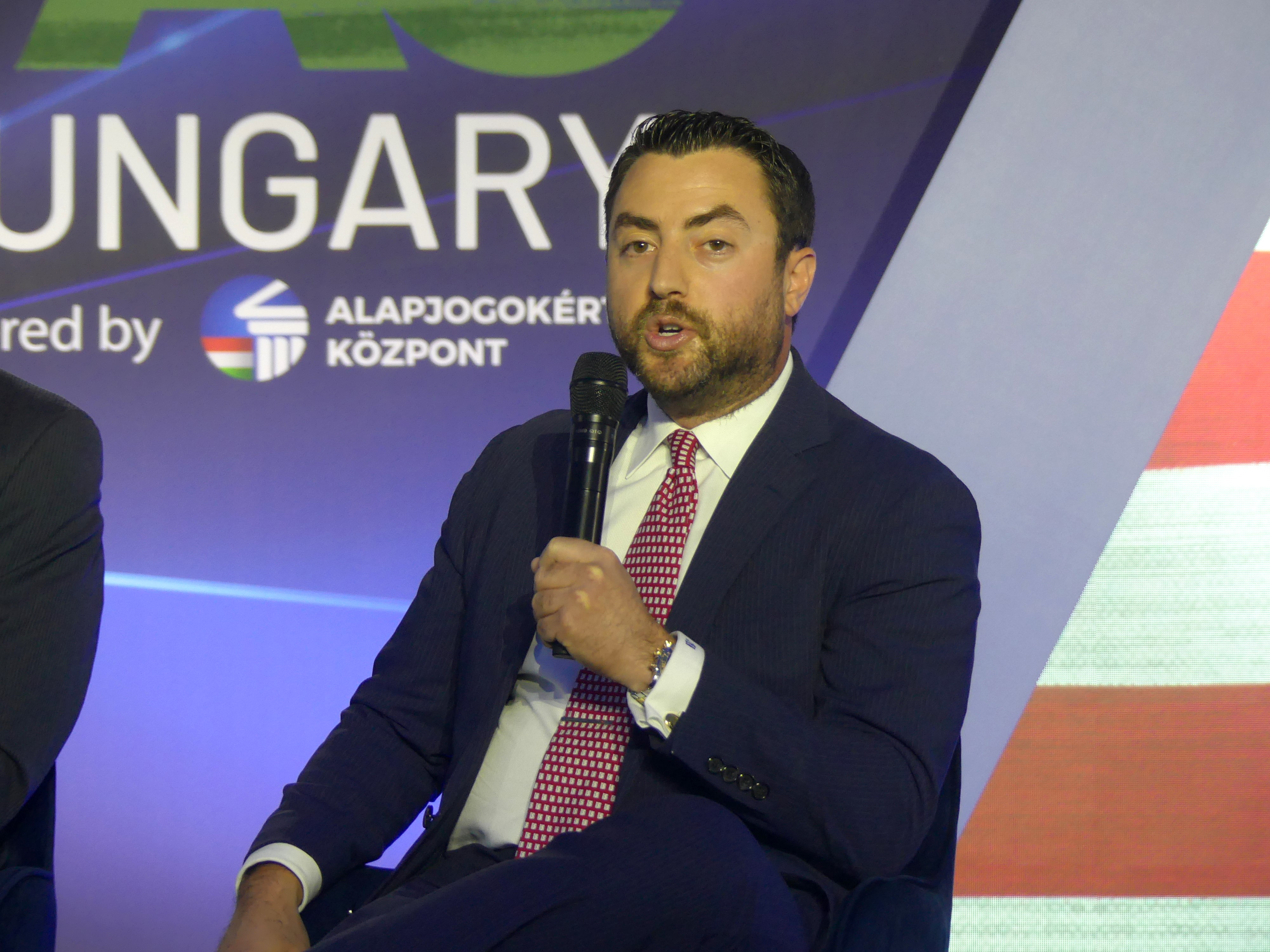
At CPAC Hungary 2023

A conservative, Hammer is a vocal commentator on conservative political, legal, and cultural issues at various publications. Hammer is a contributor to programs on networks such as Fox News, Fox Business, Newsmax, and One America News Network.

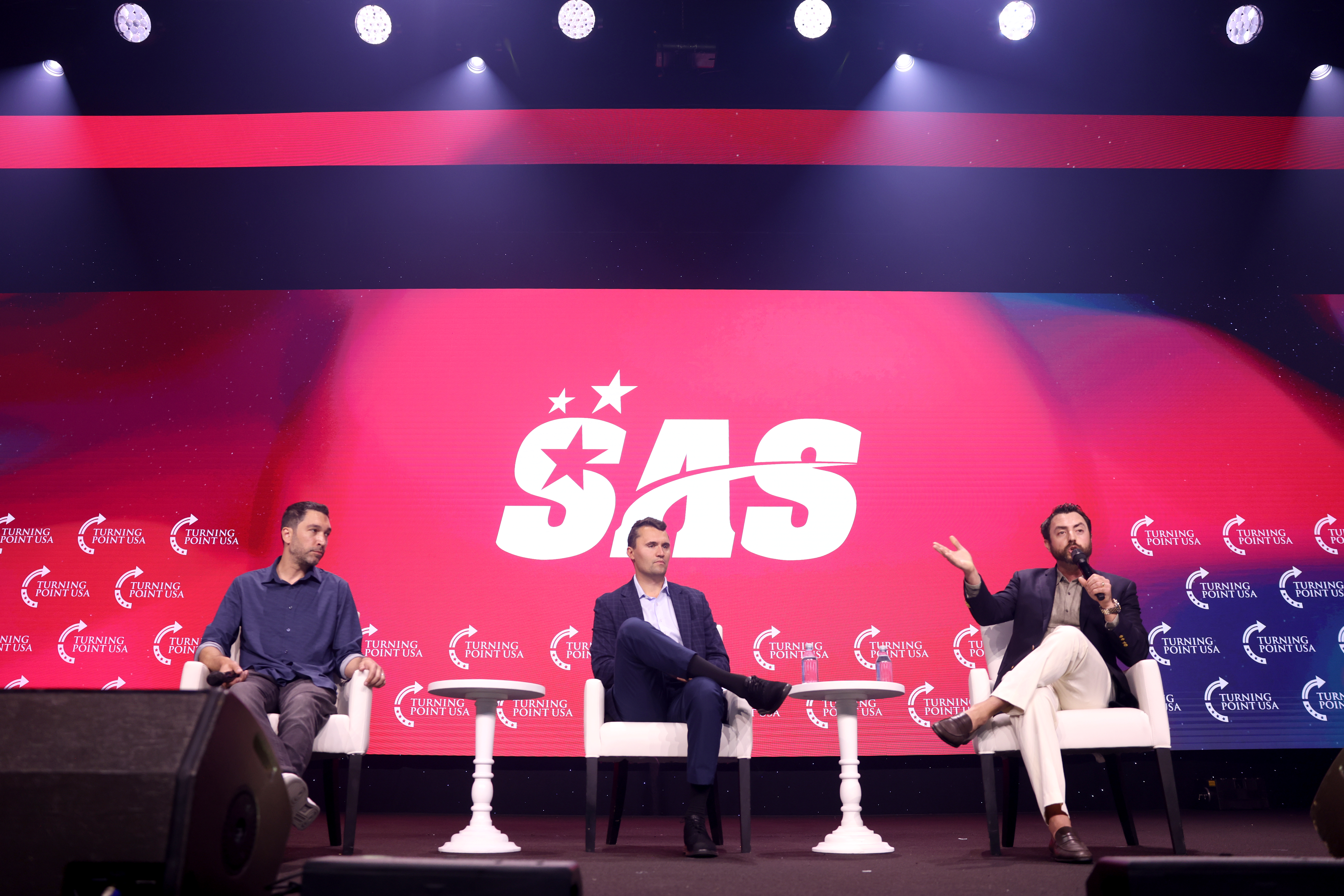
Hammer debating Dave Smith about Israel in July 2025 at the 2025 Student Action Summit, moderated by Charlie Kirk

Hammer is vocal about Jewish- and Zionist-related issues; he has debated Peter Beinart about the Israeli–Palestinian conflict, and Alan Dershowitz about the 2023 Israeli judicial reform.

Hammer was involved with Senator Ted Cruz's 2016 presidential campaign. Hammer was invited to the Florida governor's mansion to meet with Governor Ron DeSantis in January 2022.

Hammer currently sits on the boards of advisors of American Moment and the United Jewish Gun Coalition.

In May 2023, Hammer co-founded Jews Against Soros, a coalition of conservative Jews who oppose the political influence of George Soros.

== Personal life ==
In December 2022, Hammer proposed to Shir Cohen at the Western Wall in Jerusalem. They were married in December 2023.
