= Common good constitutionalism =

Constitutional legal theory by Adrian Vermeule

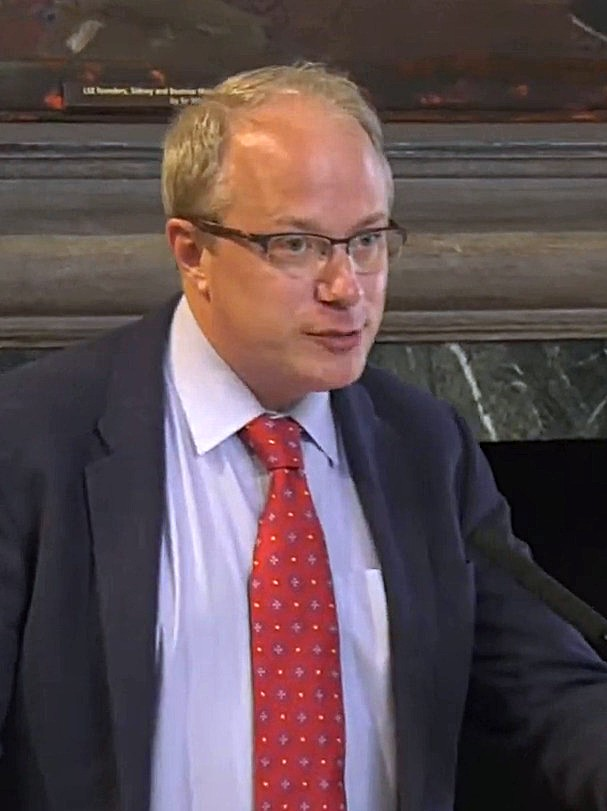
Adrian Vermeule, who formulated the theory of common good constitutionalism

Common good constitutionalism is a legal theory formulated by Harvard law professor Adrian Vermeule that asserts that "the central aim of the constitutional order is to promote good rule, not to 'protect liberty' as an end in itself". Vermeule describes it as an attempt to revive and develop the classical legal tradition by understanding enacted law as a positive application of background natural law principles. Within this tradition, he claims law is defined as "an ordinance of reason promulgated by political authorities for the common good." Vermeule states that law in this sense is "not tethered to particular written instruments of civil law or the will of the legislators who created them" but instead embody rational determinations of the common good, and it is those determinations, as well as the natural law background against which they are made, which constitute the law. Vermeule says that these principles include "a candid willingness to "legislate morality."

Common good constitutionalism, as first advanced by Adrian Vermeule in 2020, has been described as a derivative of integralism, both of which were created "to combat the legitimate societal threat of modern liberal individualism and reintroduce the spiritual common good into our political and legal discourse." Vermeule himself argues that the conjecture that natural law theory is strongly identified with Catholic political theory is "both historically and theologically erroneous". Vermeule highlights that historically, natural law theory originates with Greek and Roman philosophers, largely before Christianity became dominant. Theologically, Vermeule argues that "Catholicism itself holds that the natural law is written in the hearts of all men, and is in principle accessible to the universal natural reason common to all".

Common good constitutionalism is opposed to both originalism and liberal legal theories such as a living constitution.

== History ==
In an article in The Atlantic in March 2020, Adrian Vermeule suggested that originalism – the idea that the meaning of the American Constitution was fixed at the time of its enactment, which has been the principal legal theory of conservative judges and legal scholars for the past 50 years, but which Vermeule now characterizes as merely "a useful rhetorical and political expedient" – has outlived its usefulness and needs to be replaced by what he calls "common-good constitutionalism".

Vermeule's concept of common-good constitutionalism is:

based on the principles that government helps direct persons, associations, and society generally toward the common good, and that strong rule in the interest of attaining the common good is entirely legitimate. ... This approach should take as its starting point substantive moral principles that conduce to the common good, principles that officials (including, but by no means limited to, judges) should read into the majestic generalities and ambiguities of the written Constitution. These principles include respect for the authority of rule and of rulers; respect for the hierarchies needed for society to function; solidarity within and among families, social groups, and workers' unions, trade associations, and professions; appropriate subsidiarity, or respect for the legitimate roles of public bodies and associations at all levels of government and society; and a candid willingness to "legislate morality" –indeed, a recognition that all legislation is necessarily founded on some substantive conception of morality, and that the promotion of morality is a core and legitimate function of authority. Such principles promote the common good and make for a just and well-ordered society.

Vermeule specified that common-good constitutionalism is "not tethered to particular written instruments of civil law or the will of the legislators who created them". However, the determination of the common good made by the legislators is instrumental insofar as it embodies the background principles of the natural law. In other words, while the legislative intent is not per se controlling, positive law always seeks to put into effect natural law principles, and the intended principles behind the positive law are controlling. In that vein, he also says that "officials (including, but by no means limited to, judges)" will need "a candid willingness to 'legislate morality'" in order to create a "just and well-ordered society."

The main aim of common-good constitutionalism:

is certainly not to maximize individual autonomy or to minimize the abuse of power (an incoherent goal in any event), but instead to ensure that the ruler has the power needed to rule well ... Just authority in rulers can be exercised for the good of subjects, if necessary even against the subjects' own perceptions of what is best for them — perceptions that may change over time anyway, as the law teaches, habituates, and re-forms them. Subjects will come to thank the ruler whose legal strictures, possibly experienced at first as coercive, encourage subjects to form more authentic desires for the individual and common goods, better habits, and beliefs that better track and promote communal well-being.

Notable common good scholars beyond Vermeule include Conor Casey and Michael Foran.

== Principles ==
Thomas Aquinas defined law as "an ordinance of reason made for the common good by him who has charge of the community, and promulgated". Common good constitutionalism adopts this definition, treating positive law as a promulgated ordinance of reason, where "ordinance of reason" invokes that law which is ascertainable reason, or the natural law. Natural law provides background legal principles, such as "do good and avoid evil," that are not necessarily determinate as applied to concrete cases. Positive law, then, is made when a public authority makes a practical determination within the scope of the natural law. For example, public safety is furthered by having cars drive on one side of the road, but nothing about public safety inherently requires choosing one side of the road or the other. Thus within the requirements of public safety, the public authority is free to determine a concrete application, that is, driving on the left or right side.

In the context of the judiciary, interpretation of legal texts must then be made in light of the natural law principles made concrete by the text. They must be reviewed for rationality, but so long as the positive law does not offend reason—the background natural law principles—the judiciary should defer to the legislating authority. To return to the driving example, to require driving on the left side of the road does not offend reason, nor does driving on the right. Both further the common good by promoting public roadway safety, and thus either determination by the legislature should be deferred to.

"Common good" is defined not as a utilitarian aggregation of individual goods, nor as a subjugation of the individual to the community. Rather, it is the unification of individual and community goods that leads to personal and social flourishing. A Navy-Marine Corps Court of Criminal Appeals judge wrote in his concurrence in United States v. Tabor that "[t]he classical judge would attempt to discern what common good is desired by the statute and recognize that a statute can have a purpose toward the good of the individual, a purpose toward the good of the community, and an additional good in harmonizing the interests between the two. A statute—a lex—is an attempt to codify a higher law that a nation or a people all know to be true and good, even if it were to limit individual freedom in certain circumstances." Thus individual goods or rights must be justified in light of their contribution to the flourishing of the community.

== Reception ==
Common good constitutionalism has garnered a mix of responses, with many praising its recognition of classical legal theories, while others fear that it could lead to judicial fiat.

=== Support ===
Many natural lawyers have welcomed it as a valuable contribution to legal theory. University of Chicago legal historian Richard Helmholz described Common Good Constitutionalism (Polity, 2022) as a "serious contribution to some of the most pressing legal debates of our times ... written ... with clarity and skill." University of Texas law professor Sanford Levinson described it as "truly an important book deserving wide readership and intense discussion" while University of Michigan law professor Richard Primus saw potential in its "simple and powerful frame" but felt the book "stops short of fully describing the common good that Vermeule envisions."

Writing in the Modern Law Review, University of Glasgow legal scholar Michael Foran said the theory offers "powerful critiques of the foundational assumptions of liberal constitutionalism". Georgia State University law professor Eric Segall wrote that common good constitutionalism offers a "critique of the never-ending debates between originalists and living constitutionalists--debates that have not furthered constitutional discourse in a helpful manner."

One scholar noted its potential relevance for environmental law, stating that "[E]nvironmental advocates can benefit both from considering the common good constitutionalist approach in its own right and as a catalyst for action."

Richard H. Helmholz, in a review of Common Good Constitutionalism, described it as "a serious contribution to some of the most pressing legal debates of our times." Jack Goldsmith has praised Common Good Constitutionalism as "the most important book of American constitutional theory in many decades".

Various practicing lawyers have praised common good constitutionalism as positively contributing values and rationales that are perceived by some to be missing from the political and judicial discourse.

=== Criticism ===
Common good constitutionalism's grounding in a Catholic moral framework has led to charges that, in practice, it is inherently theocratic. David Dyzenhaus has heavily criticized Vermeule's conception of Common Good Constitutionalism, hailing it an "authoritarian" idea seeking to instill "Christian theocratic rule". He criticizes Vermeule for invoking "justification [via] a body of allegedly timeless and universal principles that animate right-wing Catholics and Evangelicals in the US", and for "worshipping the executive" which can put those ideals into practice.

Former White House Counsel under Ronald Reagan Peter Wallison criticized Vermeule for failing to define "the common good." Wallison also stated that the political order formulated by common good constitutionalism "is highly authoritarian, perhaps even totalitarian" citing Vermeule's assertion that: "Constitutional concepts such as liberty and equality need not be given libertarian or originalist readings."

In a critique in New York, politics and economics writer Eric Levitz argued that this theory of jurisprudence "allows the religious right to impose its vision of the good on the American people, whether they like it or not." Garrett Epps, a professor of law at the University of Baltimore, also wrote a critique in The Atlantic, linking common-good constitutionalism to integralism and arguing that Vermuele's approach represents authoritarianism and objects "not [because] it is harmful and antihuman, but simply that, in the end, it is so banal.

Legal theorist Martin David Kelly has raised several challenges to Common Good Constitutionalism, including that the relationship between the highly abstract conception of the common good and the concrete policy outcomes that Vermeule advocates is unclear, and that Vermeule's book lacks proper engagement with the academic literature on the common good (and on natural law theory more generally). Kelly notes that there "are many who think that, at least in some parts of the world, we have gone too far in promoting individual autonomy at the expense of our mutual interests and that, if we’re going to solve existential problems like climate change and global pandemics, some rebalancing is needed" but concludes that "anyone hoping to find, in CGC, a well-researched and thoughtful reflection on how we should perform this kind of delicate rebalancing exercise will be disappointed. Vermeule’s scholarly contribution is too thin — in failing to engage with the literature, and in leaving so many key questions unanswered (or entirely unaddressed) — and, as a political manifesto, it is unlikely to persuade any well-informed ‘floating voters’ to embrace his vision of Vermeulitania".

Originalist scholar Randy Barnett criticized the theory as subversive of America's founding principles. Conservative columnist George F. Will described Vermeule's "common-good constitutionalism" as "Christian authoritarianism — muscular paternalism, with government enforcing social solidarity for religious reasons."

== See also ==
- Political process theory
