= Nico Frijda =

Dutch psychologist (1927–2015)

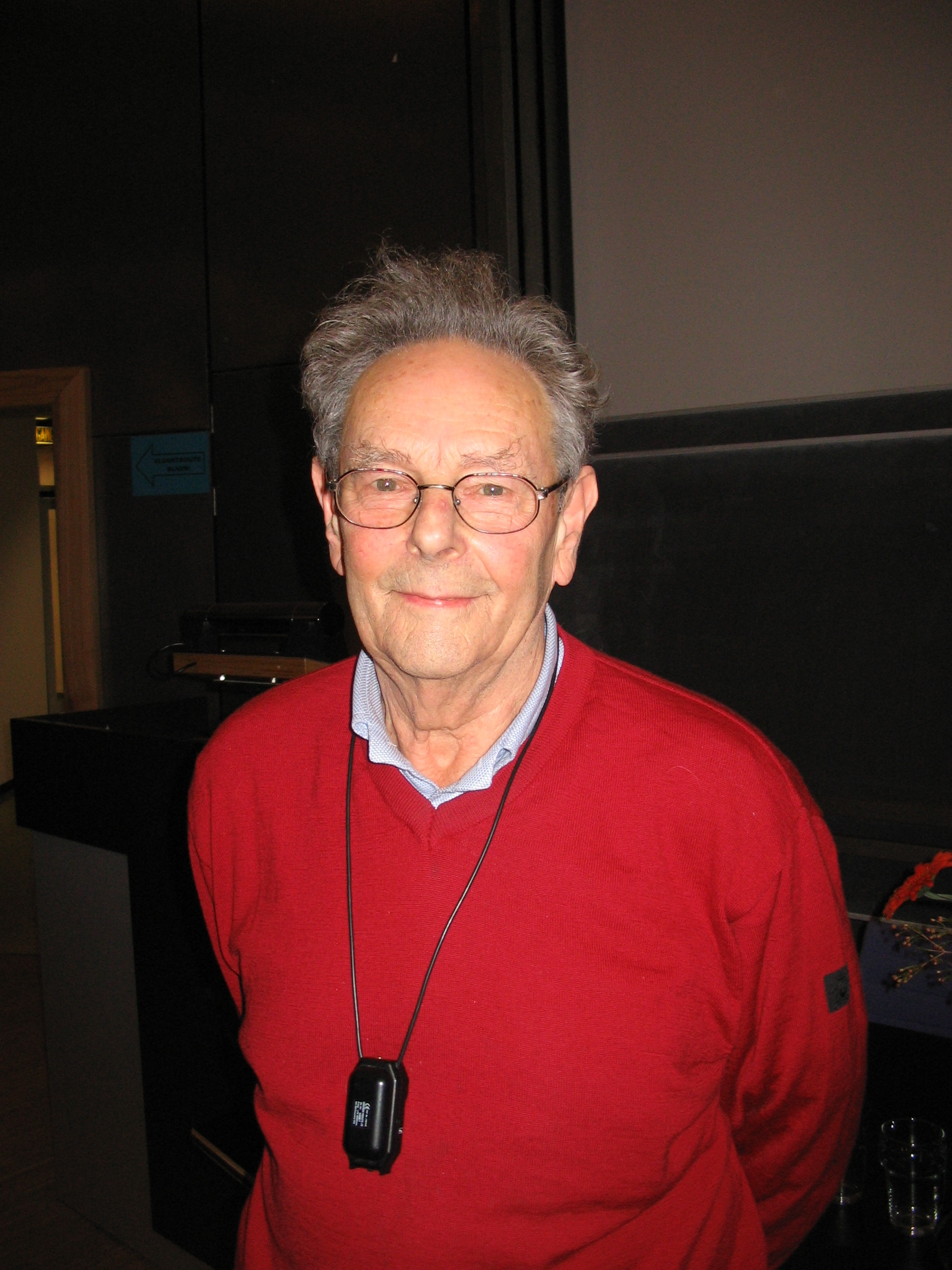
Nico Frijda

Nico Henri Frijda (1 May 1927 – 11 April 2015) was a Dutch psychologist and professor of the University of Amsterdam.

== Life ==
Frijda was born in Amsterdam. He studied psychology at the Gemeenteuniversiteit Amsterdam, where he received his PhD in 1956 on the thesis title Understanding Facial Expressions with Géza Révész as advisor. In 1965 he was appointed full professor. Frijda retired in 1992 to become emeritus professor. In 2007 he received a laurea honoris causa in psychology from University of Padova.

== Work ==
Frijda devoted his career to human emotions. In his early career he focused on facial expressions, which was an acceptable approach in the then dominant behaviourist tradition in which emotions were considered epiphenomena. Frijda developed a multifocal theory of emotions with the concept of "action tendency" as focal issues. Emotions are, in this view, tendencies to engage in behaviour influenced by the needs of the person. This theory was outlined in detail in The Emotions (1986), his magnum opus which was first published in English and two years later in a Dutch translation. He died on April 11, 2015.

== Works ==
- De betekenis van de gelaatsexpressie (1956)
- Gelaat en karakter (1958)
- Post uit Friesland (1984)
- The Emotions (1986) ISBN 0-521-30155-6 (hardcover); ISBN 0-521-31600-6 (paperback)
- De wetten van het gevoel (1987) rede ter gelegenheid van de zevende Duijkerlezing
- De emoties; een overzicht van onderzoek en theorie (1988) ISBN 90-351-0702-0
- De psychologie heeft zin (1993) ISBN 90-5333-184-0
- The Laws of Emotions (2006) (Nederlandse vertaling: januari 2008)
