= Integralism =

Principle that the Catholic faith should be the basis of public law and policy

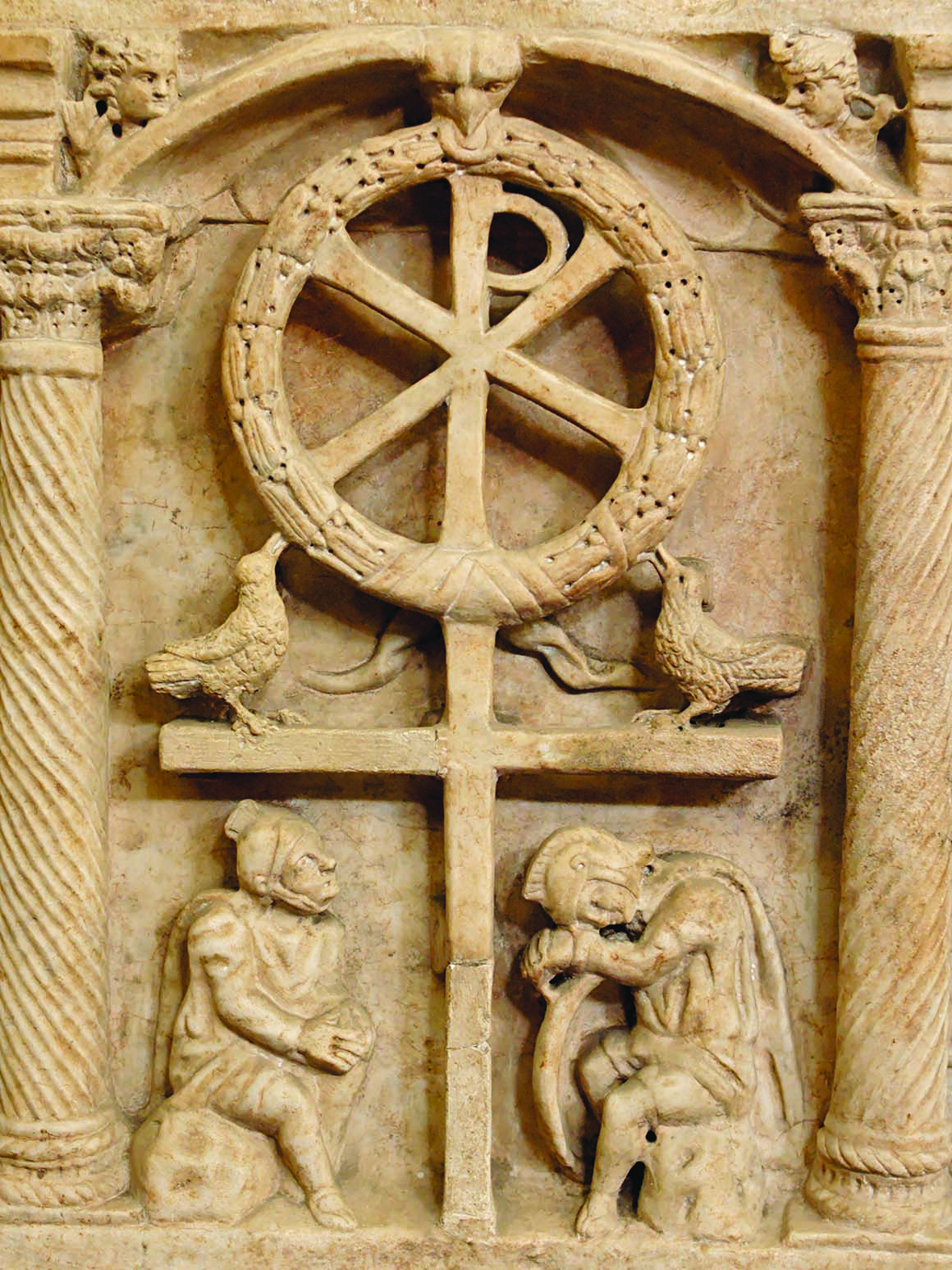
The Labarum of Constantine the Great, the first Roman emperor to embrace Christianity

Integralism, integrationism or integrism (French: intégrisme) is an interpretation of Catholic social teaching that argues the principle that the Catholic faith should be the basis of public law and public policy within civil society, wherever the preponderance of Catholics within that society makes this possible. Integralism opposes pluralism, seeking the Catholic faith to be dominant in civil and religious matters. Integralists uphold the 1864 definition of Pope Pius IX in Quanta cura that the religious neutrality of the civil power cannot be embraced as an ideal situation and the doctrine of Leo XIII in Immortale Dei on the religious obligations of states. In December 1965, the Second Vatican Council approved and Pope Paul VI promulgated the document Dignitatis humanae – the council's "Declaration on Religious Freedom" – which states that it "leaves untouched traditional Catholic doctrine on the moral duty of men and societies toward the true religion and toward the one Church of Christ". However, they have simultaneously declared "that the human person has a right to religious freedom," a move that some traditionalist Catholics argue is at odds with previous doctrinal pronouncements.

The term is sometimes used more loosely and in non-Catholic contexts to refer to a set of theoretical concepts and practical policies that advocate a fully integrated social and political order based on a comprehensive doctrine of human nature. In this generic sense some forms of integralism are focused purely on achieving political and social integration, others national or ethnic unity, while others were more focused on achieving religious and cultural uniformity. Integralism has, thus, also been used to describe non-Catholic religious movements, such as Protestant fundamentalism or Islamism. In the political and social history of the 19th and 20th centuries, the term integralism was often applied to traditionalist conservatism and similar political movements on the right wing of a political spectrum, but it was also adopted by various centrist movements as a tool of political, national and cultural integration.

As a distinct intellectual and political movement, integralism emerged during the 19th and early 20th century polemics within the Catholic Church, especially in France. The term was used as an epithet to describe those who opposed the modernists, who had sought to create a synthesis between Christian theology and the liberal philosophy of secular modernity. Proponents of integralism taught that all social and political action ought to be based on the Catholic Faith. They rejected the separation of church and state, arguing that Catholicism should be the proclaimed religion of the state.

== Overview ==
=== History ===
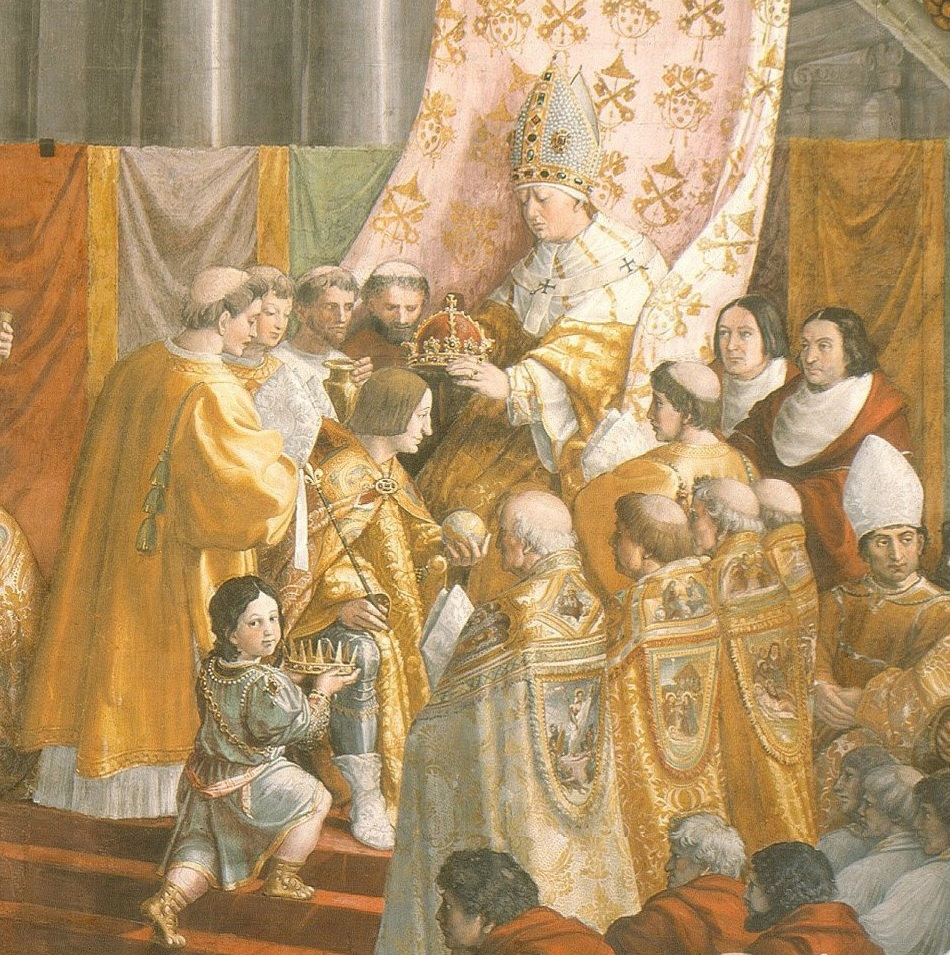
The Coronation of Charlemagne, fresco from the workshop of Raphael depicting the crowning of Charlemagne as Imperator Romanorum by Pope Leo III on Christmas Day, 800

The first polity that formally embraced Christianity was Armenia under Tiridates III. However, the establishment of the civil order upheld by integralists is generally thought of as beginning with the conversion of Roman Emperor Constantine I in 312. While Constantine personally embraced Christianity, it was only in 380 that Theodosius I formally adopted Nicene Christianity as the religion of the empire by the Edict of Thessalonica. What R. W. Southern called the identification of the Church with the whole of organised society was intensified by the legal reforms of Justinian in the 6th century. The climactic stage in the identification began in the Latin West with the papal transference of Translatio imperii to Charlemagne in 800. The Constantinian age began to decline with the Reformation and is generally treated as ending with the French Revolution. In 1950, Pius XII identified the Dominican friar and prophet Savonarola as an early pioneer of integralism in the face of the "neo-pagan" influences of the Renaissance: "Savonarola shows us the strong conscience of the ascetic and an apostle who has a lively sense of things divine and eternal, who takes a stand against rampant paganism, who remains faithful to the evangelical and Pauline ideal of integral Christianity, put into action in public life as well and animating all institutions. This is why he started preaching, prompted by an interior voice and inspired by God."

=== Teachings ===
Catholic integralism is an interpretation of Catholic social teaching that argues for an authoritarian and anti-pluralist Catholic state, wherever the preponderance of Catholics within that society makes this possible; it was born in 19th-century Portugal, Spain, France, and Italy. It was a movement that sought to assert a Catholic underpinning to all social and political action and to minimize or eliminate any competing ideological actors, such as secular humanism and liberalism. Integralism arose in opposition to liberalism, which some Catholics saw as a "relentless and destructive ideology". Catholic integralism does not support the creation of an autonomous "Catholic" State Church, or Erastianism (Gallicanism in French context). Rather, it supports subordinating the state to the moral principles of Catholicism, rejects separating morality from the state, and favours Catholicism as the proclaimed religion of the state.

Catholic integralism appeals to the teaching on the necessity of the subordination of the state and on the subordination of temporal to spiritual power of medieval popes such as Pope Gregory VII and Pope Boniface VIII. However, Catholic integralism as a more consciously articulated doctrine came about as a reaction against the political and cultural changes that followed the Enlightenment and the French Revolution. The 19th-century papacy challenged the growth of liberalism (with its doctrine of popular sovereignty) as well as new scientific and historical methods and theories (which were thought to threaten the special status of the Christian revelation). Pope Pius IX condemned a list of liberal and Enlightenment ideas in his Syllabus of Errors. The term integralism was applied to a Spanish political party founded about 1890, which based its programme on the Syllabus. Catholic integralism reached its "classical" form in the reaction against modernism. The term did not, however, become popular till the time of Pope Pius X, whose papacy lasted from 1903 to 1914. After the papal condemnation of modernism in 1907, those most active in promoting the papal teachings were sometimes referred to as "integral Catholics" (French: Catholiques intégraux), from which the words intégrisme (integrism) and intégralisme (integralism) were derived. Encouraged by Pope Pius X, they sought out and exposed any co-religionist whom they suspected of modernism or liberalism. An important integralist organization was the Sodalitium Pianum, known in France as La Sapinière (fir plantation), which was founded in 1909 by Umberto Benigni.

Another component of the anti-modernist programme of Pius X was its insistence on the importance of Thomas Aquinas, both in theology and philosophy. In his decree Postquam Sanctissimus of 1914, the pope published a list of 24 philosophical theses to summarise "the principles and more important thoughts" of St Thomas. Thus, integralism is also understood to include a commitment to the teachings of the Angelic Doctor, especially as a bulwark against the subjectivist and skeptical philosophies emanating from Descartes and his successors.

=== Political authority ===
The idea that temporal political authority should be subordinated to man's ultimate, spiritual end is a common theme – if not the main theme – of contemporary Catholic integralism.

=== Revival ===
Contemporary discussions of integralism were renewed in 2014, focusing on criticism of liberalism and capitalism.

In recent years, however, a "revived Catholic integralism" has been noted among the younger generation of Catholics writing for websites such as The Josias. Integralism could be said to merely be the modern continuation of the traditional Catholic conception of Church–State relations elucidated by Pope Gelasius I and expounded upon throughout the centuries up to the Syllabus of Errors, which condemned the idea that the separation of Church and State is a moral good. For example, some Catholics have praised the actions of Pius IX in the 1858 Mortara case, in which he ordered the abduction of a six-year-old Jewish boy who had been baptized without his parents' consent. A systematic account of Catholic integralism as a coherent political philosophy has recently been attempted by Thomas Crean and Alan Fimister in their work, Integralism: A Manual of Political Philosophy.

Scholars have drawn parallels between Catholic integralism and a view held by a minority in the Reformed churches, Christian reconstructionism. In the National Catholic Reporter, Joshua J. McElwee stated that both Catholic integralists and Reformed Christian reconstructionists have created a non-traditional ecumenical alliance to achieve the goal of establishing a "theocratic type of state". Some integralists place themselves on the left wing of the political spectrum. Tradistae and Tradinista, both groups acknowledge what they see as the duty of the state towards the Catholic Church as well as supporting Liberation Theology and rejecting capitalism.

Integralism has been identified as a basis for modern legal conceptions that emphasize natural law, including common good constitutionalism. Proposed and popularized by Adrian Vermeule, common good constitutionalism was developed like integralism to "combat the legitimate societal threat of modern liberal individualism". Some Protestant figures, such as Brad Littlejohn, have expressed interest in integralism and contended it more closely resembles a traditionally Protestant account of politics rather than a Catholic one.

== Variants ==
There are a number of variants and localized permutations of integralist political theory, often named by their country of origin.

=== French integralism ===
The term "intégrisme" is largely used generically and pejoratively in French philosophical and sociopolitical parlance, particularly to label any religious extremism. Integralism in the narrow sense is often but controversially applied to the integral nationalism and Action Française movement founded by Charles Maurras although Maurras was an atheist and his movement was condemned by Rome as 'political modernism' in 1926. Jacques Maritain claimed that his own position of Integral humanism, which he adopted after rejecting Action Française, was the authentically integralist stance, although it is generally viewed as its antithesis.

=== Portuguese integralism ===
Integralismo Lusitano (Lusitanian Integralism) was the integralist movement of Portugal, founded in 1914. Portuguese integralism was traditionalist, but not conservative. It was against parliamentarism and, instead, it favored decentralization, Catholicism and the monarchy.

=== Brazilian integralism ===
The Brazilian integralist movement led by Plínio Salgado – Ação Integralista Brasileira – was founded in Brazil on 7 October 1932; it lasted less than six years as a legally recognized organization. The Brazilian integralist movement was the most successful fascist movement in Latin America.

=== Spanish integralism ===
The political implications of Catholic integralism are apparent in the Basque-Navarrese context of Spain, where that Integrism or Traditionalist Catholicism refers to a 19th- and 20th-century anti-Liberal movement advocating for the re-establishment of not only clerical but also native institutions lost in the context of the First Carlist War (1833, 1840). One of its branches evolved by the turn of the 20th century into Basque nationalism.

The term may also refer to the Spanish formation led by Ramón Nocedal Romea and Juan Olazábal Ramery.

== Criticism ==
The Southern Poverty Law Center used the term "integrism" to refer to "radical traditional Catholics" who reject the Second Vatican Council. The SPLC described them as antisemitic and "extremely conservative" regarding women, and also notes that some claim recent popes are illegitimate.

Critics and opponents of integralism, such as Catholic author and political analyst George Weigel, argue that the movement can be associated with fascism. John Zmirak criticizes contemporary Catholic integralists as enemies of "religious liberty". Supporters of integralism argue that it is a mistake to associate the movement with fascism, stating that it developed before fascism, and that collaboration between fascist and integralist groups is overstated. Authors such as Thomas Pink insist integralism is compatible with Vatican II's account of religious freedom.

== See also ==
- Acción Española
- Catholic Worker Movement
- Christian democracy
  - Distributism
  - Social credit
- Christian socialism
- Guardianship of the Islamic Jurist
- Integral humanism (India)
- Liberation theology
- Postliberalism
- Mexican Democratic Party
- Relations between the Catholic Church and the State
- Religious discrimination
- Social integration
- Temporal power of the Holy See
- Traditionalist conservatism

== Sources ==
- Bourchier, David (2015). Illiberal Democracy in Indonesia: The Ideology of the Family State. Routledge. ISBN 978-0-203-37972-1. OCLC 58053654.
- Chappel, James (2018). Catholic Modern: The Challenge of Totalitarianism and the Remaking of the Church. Harvard University Press. ISBN 978-0-674-97210-0.
- Leandro Pereira Gonçalves; Caldeira, Odilon (2022). Fascism in Brazil: From Integralism to Bolsonarism. Abington, New York City: Routledge. doi:10.4324/9781003224570. ISBN 978-1-000-58198-0. LCCN 2021055578. OCLC 1289618190. OL 36276854M. Wikidata Q118985841.
- Ménard, Xavier; Su, Anna (June 2022). "Liberalism, Catholic Integralism, and the Question of Religious Freedom". BYU Law Review. 47 (4): 1171–1218.
