= Helen Cam =

English historian

Helen Maud Cam, CBE, FBA, FRHistS (22 August 1885 – 9 February 1968) was an English historian of the Middle Ages, and the first woman to be appointed a tenured professor at Harvard University.

== Life and career ==
Cam was born at Abingdon, Berkshire (now Oxfordshire). Educated at home by her father William Herbert Cam, the headmaster of Abingdon School, she did her undergraduate degree at Royal Holloway College gaining a First in History there, and later an MA in Anglo-Saxon and Frankish studies at the University of London, after a fellowship year at Bryn Mawr College This degree led to her first book, Local Government in Francia and England, 768–1034 (1912).

After teaching at Cheltenham Ladies' College and Royal Holloway, she became a fellow of Girton College, Cambridge in 1921. In 1948 she took up the Zemurray Radcliffe Professorship at Harvard, a position she held until her retirement in 1954.

In 1949 she became, as the successor to François Olivier-Martin (1879–1952), the president of the International Commission for the History of Assemblies of Estates. She retired as president in 1960.

On her retirement in 1960 she received as a seventy-fifth birthday present the two-volume Festschrift prepared in her honor by scholars of thirteen countries, which was published with the blessing of the Commission under the title Album Helen Cam.

Cam's focus was on local administration, as opposed to the constitutional and legal history of the dominant historians of the age, Stubbs and Maitland. Though an admirer of both, she greatly expanded on and revised the work of these men. Her work was of great scholarly value, but she was also able to write successfully for a wider audience, illustrated best by her England before Elizabeth (1950). She also had an interest in historical fiction, expressed in Historical Novels (1961). She objected to the exculpation of historical figures such as Richard III.

In 1945 she was elected to the British Academy, the third woman to be elected to the fellowship, and in the same year she became the first woman to deliver the Raleigh Lecture there. Cam was elected a Fellow of the American Academy of Arts and Sciences in 1950. She received honorary doctorates from Smith College, Mount Holyoke College, the University of North Carolina, and Oxford. She acted as vice-president both of the Selden Society and of the Royal Historical Society. In 1957 she was appointed CBE.

== Select bibliography ==
- Studies in the hundred rolls: some aspects of thirteenth-century administration, Oxford: Clarendon press, 1921
- The hundred and the hundred rolls; an outline of local government in medieval England, London, Methuen 1930
- Liberties and communities in medieval England: collected studies in local administration and topography Cambridge: Cambridge University Press, 1944.
- England before Elizabeth, London, New York: Hutchinson's University Library, 1950
- Law as it looks to a historian, Cambridge: W. Heffer 1956
- What of the Middle Ages is alive in England today, London: Athlone press, 1961.
- Historical novels, London: Historical Association, 1961.
- Law-finders and law-makers in medieval England: collected studies in legal and constitutional history, London: Merlin press, 1962.
- Magna carta-- event or document?, London: B. Quaritch, 1965.

== Sources ==
- Kathleen Major, 'Cam, Helen Maud (1885–1968)', rev., Oxford Dictionary of National Biography, Oxford University Press, 2004 (http://www.oxforddnb.com/view/article/32254, accessed 26 March 2007)
- Encyclopedia of Historians and Historical Writing, Kelly Boyd (ed.), London: Fitzroy Dearborn, 1999, pp. 166–7.
- Euan Taylor, 'Helen Cam, the Academic Life and the Idea of Community' PhD thesis (Darwin College, Cambridge (2000))
