= Blakey Vermeule =

American writer (born 1966)

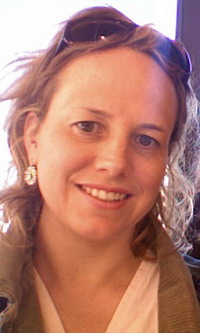
- Born: Emily Dickinson Blake Vermeule; July 14, 1966 (age 60); Cambridge, Massachusetts, U.S.
- Education: Yale University (BA); University of California, Berkeley (MA, PhD)
- Spouse: Terry Castle
- Relatives: Cornelius Vermeule (father); Emily Vermeule (mother); Adrian Vermeule (brother)

Emily Dickinson Blake "Blakey" Vermeule (born July 14, 1966) is an American scholar of eighteenth-century British literature and theory of mind. She is a professor of English at Stanford University.

== Biography ==
Vermeule is the daughter of classicist Emily Vermeule and Cornelius Clarkson Vermeule III, a scholar and former curator at the Museum of Fine Arts, Boston. Her brother, Adrian Vermeule, is a professor at Harvard Law School. Her wife is Terry Castle, also a professor of English at Stanford.

Her research interests include British literature from 1660 to 1800, critical theory, major British poets, post-Colonial fiction, the history of the novel, the cognitive underpinnings of fiction, and human evolutionary psychology. Her recent scholarship has focused on Darwinian literary studies. Vermeule previously taught at Northwestern University and Yale University.

In 2015, Vermeule co-founded the book review The New Rambler.

== Education ==
Ph.D. English Literature, University of California, Berkeley, 1995
B.A. English, summa cum laude, Yale University, 1988

== Works ==
- Action Versus Contemplation: Why an Ancient Debate Still Matters (University of Chicago Press, 2018) ISBN 978-0-226-03223-8
- The Party of Humanity: Writing Moral Psychology in Eighteenth-Century Britain (2000) ISBN 0-8018-6459-3
- Why Do We Care about Literary Characters? (2009) ISBN 0-8018-9360-7
