= William Herbert Cam =

William Herbert Cam (1850–1927) was an English teacher and clergyman, who was headmaster of Dudley Grammar School (1879–83) and Abingdon School (1883–93), and the father of the historian Helen Cam.

== Life ==
William Herbert Cam was born on 10 November 1850, the son of William and Emily Anne Cam of Dursley, Gloucestershire.

William Herbert Cam was at Bedford School and a scholar of New College, Oxford. He was a master at Wellington College, headmaster of Dudley Grammar School (1879–83) and Abingdon School (1883–93). He was then rector of Birchanger and rector of Paulerspury.

Cam married Kate Scott and they had nine children. Their daughter Helen Maud Cam (1885–1968) who initially was educated by her father at School House, Abingdon School, became vice-mistress of Girton College, Cambridge (1944–48) and professor of medieval history at Harvard University (1948–54).

He died on 3 October 1927 aged 76.
