= Leandro Pereira Gonçalves =

Brazilian historian

Leandro Pereira Gonçalves is a Brazilian historian, academic, and professor who works at the Federal University of Juiz de Fora. Specialized in the study of contemporary right-wing ideologies, particularly in Latin America, he is considered a reference in the subject of Integralism, which he has been researching for over twenty years. Gonçalves is the author of a series of books and articles on the matter, including a biography of Plínio Salgado.
