= Cornelius Clarkson Vermeule III =

American archaeologist and art curator

Cornelius Vermeule
- Born: Cornelius Clarkson Vermeule III; August 10, 1925; Orange, New Jersey, U.S.
- Died: November 27, 2008 (aged 83); Cambridge, Massachusetts, U.S.
- Other names: Wentworth Bunsen; Isao Tsukinabe; Northwold Nuffler
- Spouse: Emily Townsend (m. 1957; died 2001)
- Children: Blakey Vermeule (daughter); Adrian Vermeule (son)
- Awards: Guggenheim Fellowship (1969)

Academic background
- Education: Harvard University (BA, MA); University of London (PhD)

Academic work
- Discipline: Western Art
- Sub-discipline: Ancient and Roman art
- Institutions: Museum of Fine Arts, Boston
- Notable works: The Cult Images of Imperial Rome; Numismatic Art in America; European Art and the Classical Past

Cornelius Clarkson Vermeule III (August 10, 1925 – November 27, 2008) was an American scholar of ancient art and curator of classical art at the Museum of Fine Arts, Boston, from 1957 to 1996. He was also well known as a numismatist. He also used the pseudonyms Wentworth Bunsen, Isao Tsukinabe and Northwold Nuffler.

== Biography ==
He was born in Orange, New Jersey, on August 10, 1925, to Cornelius Clarkson Vermeule II. Vermeule entered Harvard University in 1943, the same year his father's died by suicide. The continued escalation of World War II prompted him to join the United States Army.

Vermeule married the archaeologist Emily Dickinson Townsend in 1957. Emily Vermeule was a classical scholar and the Doris Zemurray Stone Professor at Harvard University. He is the father of Emily Dickinson Blake "Blakey" Vermeule, a professor of English at Stanford University and Adrian Vermeule, a law professor at Harvard Law School.

In the Army he studied Japanese and was sent to the Pacific Theater, where he stayed in Japan after the war as a language expert, attaining the rank of captain. He completed his A.B. at Harvard University in 1947 and his A.M. in 1951 under George M.A. Hanfmann. He earned his Ph.D. at the University of London in 1953.

From 1953 to 1955 he taught fine arts at the University of Michigan. From there he shifted to Bryn Mawr College as Professor of archaeology until 1957 when was appointed curator of classical collections for the Museum of Fine Arts, Boston. He married a Bryn Mawr student, Emily Townsend that same year. While at the Museum, Vermeule was also a Lecturer in fine arts at Smith College. He was awarded a Guggenheim Fellowship in 1969.

Vermeule assumed the directorship of the Museum of Fine Arts in the 1970s. His term as curator was marked by the purchase of two large vases portraying the fall of Troy and the death of Agamemnon, a Roman portrait of an old man, and a Minoan gold double ax. He trained several curators, including Marion True of the J. Paul Getty Museum and Carlos Picon.

He died at age 83 in Cambridge, Massachusetts, on November 27, 2008, of the complications from a stroke.

== Works ==
- (with Norman Jacobs) Japanese Coinage, Numismatic Review, New York, 1953.
- 'Modern Japanese and Chinese coins in the British Museum (part I)', Numismatic Chronicle, 1954, 186-96. 'Part II', Numismatic Chronicle, 1955, 215-221.
- A Bibliography of Applied Numismatics in the Fields of Greek and Roman Archaeology and the Fine Arts. (London, 1956).
- [as Isao Tsukinabe] Old Bodrum. Somerset Society, 1964.
- European Art and the Classical Past. (Cambridge, 1964).
- Numismatic Art in America. (Cambridge, 1971).
- with Neuerburg, Norman, and Helen Lattimore. Catalogue of the Ancient Art in the J. Paul Getty Museum: the Larger Statuary, Wall Paintings and Mosaics. (Malibu, 1973).
- Greek Sculpture and Roman Taste: the Purpose and Setting of Graeco-Roman Art in Italy and the Greek Imperial East. (Ann Arbor, 1977).
- The Cult Images of Imperial Rome. (Rome, 1987).
- Art and Archaeology of Antiquity. 4 vols. London: Pindar Press, 2001-2003.
