= Terry Castle =

American literary scholar

- Born: October 18, 1953 (age 72) San Diego, California, U.S.
- Education: University of Puget Sound (BA); University of Minnesota (MA, PhD)
- Spouse: Blakey Vermeule

Terry Castle (born October 18, 1953) is an American literary scholar. Once described by Susan Sontag as "the most expressive, most enlightening literary critic at large today," she has published eight books, including the anthology The Literature of Lesbianism, which won the Lambda Literary Editor's Choice Award. She writes on topics ranging from 18th-century ghost stories to World War I-era lesbianism to the so-called "photographic fringe."

The daughter of British parents, Castle was born in San Diego and lived in England and Southern California as a child. She attended the University of Puget Sound and graduated in 1975 with a B.A. in English. She went on to attend the University of Minnesota to get her Ph.D. in English.

A longtime resident of San Francisco, Castle is currently Walter A. Haas Professor in the Humanities at Stanford University. Her wife is Blakey Vermeule, also a professor at Stanford.

Starting around 2000, Castle increasingly began to write more widely and on personal topics beyond her academic career, writing that "having labored in the dusty groves of academe for over twenty years, I felt—as a new millennium unfolded—a desire to write more directly and personally than had previously been the case." Her essays appear frequently in the London Review of Books, the Atlantic, and the New Republic.

== Bibliography ==
- Clarissa's Ciphers: Meaning and Disruption in Richardson's 'Clarissa' (1982) ISBN 0-8014-1495-4
- Masquerade and Civilization: The Carnivalesque in Eighteenth-Century English Culture and Fiction (1986) ISBN 0-8047-1468-1
- The Apparitional Lesbian: Female Homosexuality and Modern Culture (1993) ISBN 0-231-07652-5
- The Female Thermometer: Eighteenth-Century Culture and the Invention of the Uncanny (1995) ISBN 0-19-508098-X
- Noël Coward and Radclyffe Hall: Kindred Spirits (1996) ISBN 0-231-10597-5
- Boss Ladies, Watch Out! Essays on Women, Sex, and Writing (2002) ISBN 0-415-93874-0
- Courage, Mon Amie (2002) ISBN 1-873092-03-2
- The Literature of Lesbianism: A Historical Anthology From Ariosto to Stonewall (2003) ISBN 0-231-12511-9
- The Professor and Other Writings (2010) ISBN 0-06-167090-1 (Republished as The Professor: A Sentimental Education. ISBN 0061670928).
