= Cornelius Clarkson Vermeule I =

Civil engineer and topographer

Cornelius Clarkson Vermeule
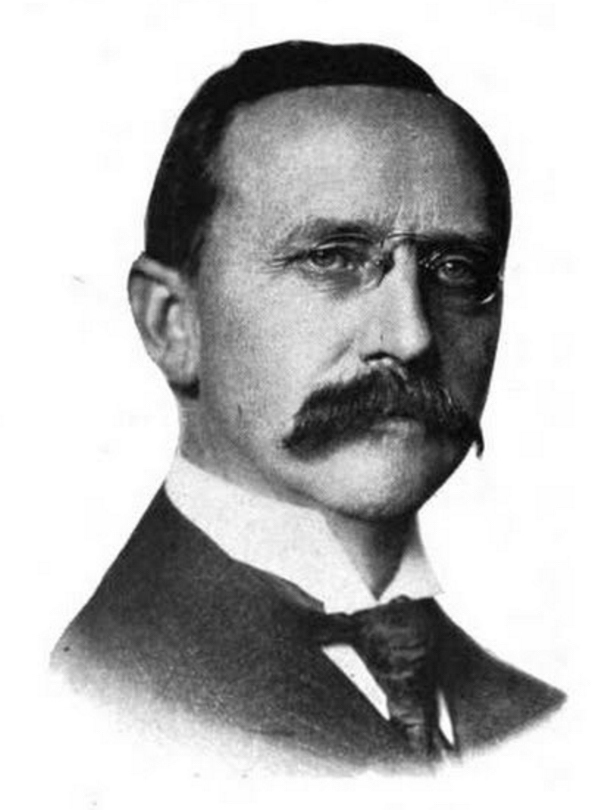
- Born: September 5, 1858; Raritan Landing, New Jersey
- Died: February 1, 1950 (aged 91); New Brunswick, New Jersey
- Spouse: Carolyn Carpenter (m. 1888)
- Children: 2, including Cornelius II

Cornelius Clarkson Vermeule (September 5, 1858 – February 1, 1950), was a civil engineer and topographer in New Jersey and New York.

== Biography ==
Cornelius Clarkson Vermeule was born at Raritan Landing, New Jersey, on September 5, 1858, the son of Adrian Vermeule and Maria Vechte. Vermeule graduated from Rutgers College in 1878 and joined the United States Geological Survey. He married Carolyn Carpenter June 7, 1888, and they had two sons, Cornelius Clarkson Vermeule II and Warren Carpenter Vermeule. He died on February 1, 1950, in Robert Wood Johnson University Hospital, New Brunswick, New Jersey.

== Career ==
After graduating from Rutgers College in 1878, Vermeule joined the United States Geological Survey. During his work with the USGS, he headed a project which completed the first topographical survey of New Jersey in 1888. Over the next three decades, Vermeule continued to serve as a consulting engineer for the state of New Jersey. In private practice, Vermeule had offices in New York City and completed numerous engineering projects of a hydrological nature throughout New Jersey and New York States. In the 1920s, during his tenure as consulting engineer for the dismantling of the Morris Canal, Vermeule retired from his position and was succeeded by his son, Cornelius Clarkson Vermeule II.

He was a member of the Holland Society of New York, the Sons of the American Revolution, the New Jersey Historical Society and the American Water Works Association.
