= Glen Weyl =

American economist (born 1985)

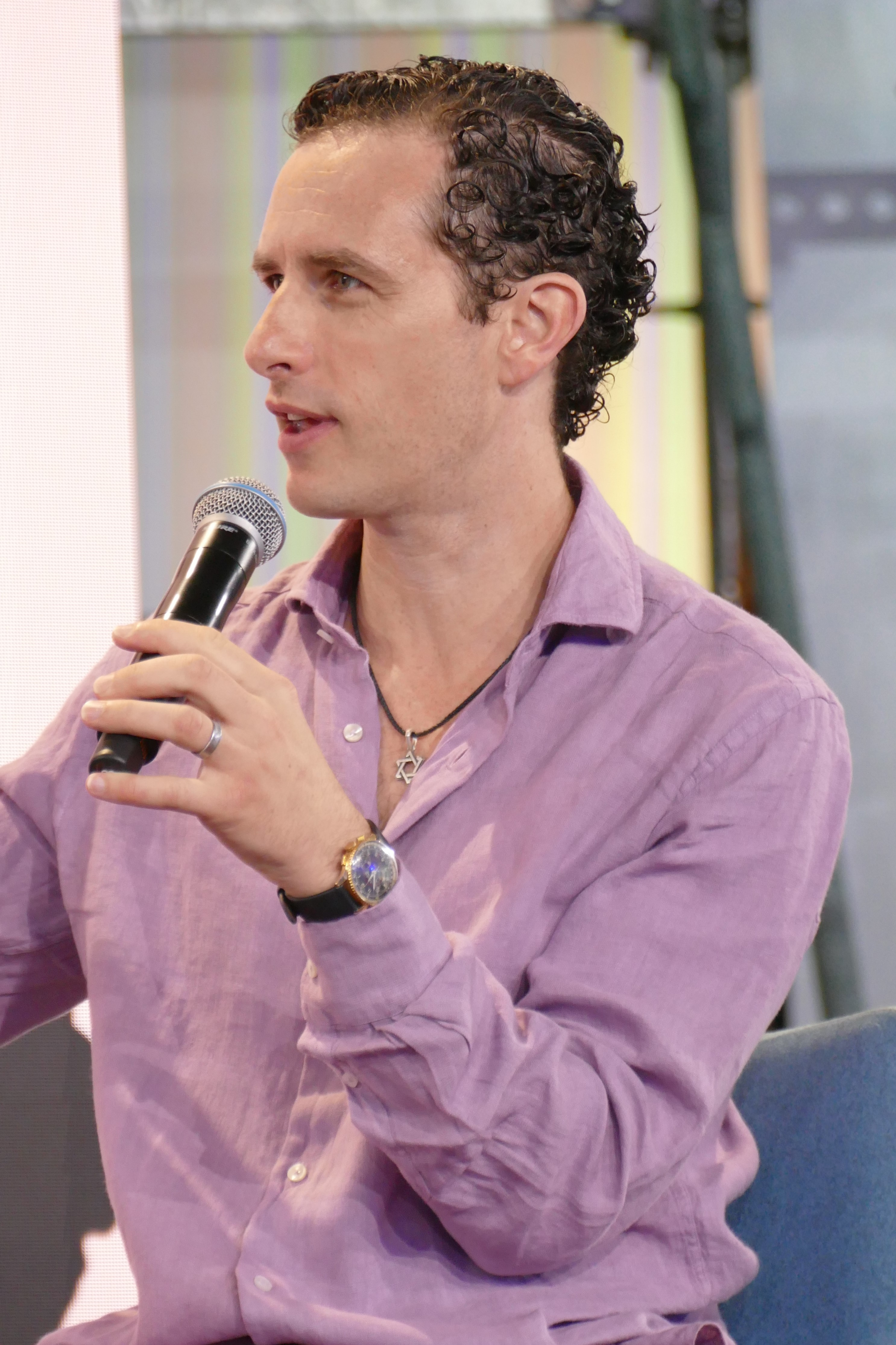
Glen Weyl at Re:publica 2024

Eric Glen Weyl (born May 6, 1985) is an American economist at Microsoft Research, and a co-author (with Eric Posner) of the book Radical Markets: Uprooting Capitalism and Democracy for a Just Society.

Weyl helped create a collective decision-making procedure known as quadratic voting, designed to allow fine-grained expression of how strongly voters feel about an issue, and also a method of democratically disbursing resources known as quadratic funding.

== Early life and education ==
Weyl was born in San Francisco, and grew up in Palo Alto, California. He is Jewish. Growing up, his family favored the Democratic Party. In his youth, Weyl embraced free-market beliefs after being introduced to the works of Ayn Rand and Milton Friedman.

Weyl graduated from Choate Rosemary Hall in 2003, where he won the Douglass North award for economics and the William Gardner and Mary Atwater Choate Award for outstanding male scholar. He went on to attend Princeton University, where four years later, he was valedictorian of the class of 2007; while still an undergraduate, he completed the required coursework and exams for a doctoral degree in economics, which he received the next year, under the supervision of Jean Tirole, José Scheinkman, Hyun-Song Shin, and Roland Bénabou.

== Career ==
After receiving his PhD, Weyl spent three years as a Junior Fellow at the Harvard Society of Fellows, and another three years as an assistant professor at the University of Chicago, before joining Microsoft Research as an economist and researcher. He also teaches a course at Yale University, titled "Designing the Digital Economy," that blends economics and computer science in much the way that digital economists blend them at tech companies.

== Selected bibliography ==
- ⿻ 數位 Plurality: The Future of Collaborative Technology and Democracy (Independently published, Apr 16, 2024, ISBN 979-8321247181), written with Audrey Tang and ⿻ Community
- Radical Markets: Uprooting Capitalism and Democracy for a Just Society (Princeton University Press, May 15, 2018, ISBN 978-0691177502), written with Eric Posner

=== Articles ===
- "Should We Treat Data as Labor? Moving beyond 'Free'", American Economic Association / aeaweb.org (2018, with Imanol Arrieta-Ibarra, Leonard Goff, Diego Jiménez-Hernández, and Jaron Lanier)
- "A proposal to limit the anti-competitive power of institutional investors", Antitrust Law Journal (2017, with FM Scott Morton)
- "Pass-through as an economic tool: Principles of incidence under imperfect competition", Journal of Political Economy (2013, with M Fabinger)
- "A price theory of multi-sided platforms", American Economic Review (2010)

== Personal life ==
Weyl married Alisha Caroline Holland in 2010. They met in 2003 during their first year at Princeton. As of 2018, Holland worked at Princeton as an associate professor of politics.

== See also ==
- Harberger Tax
