= Eric Posner =

American legal scholar

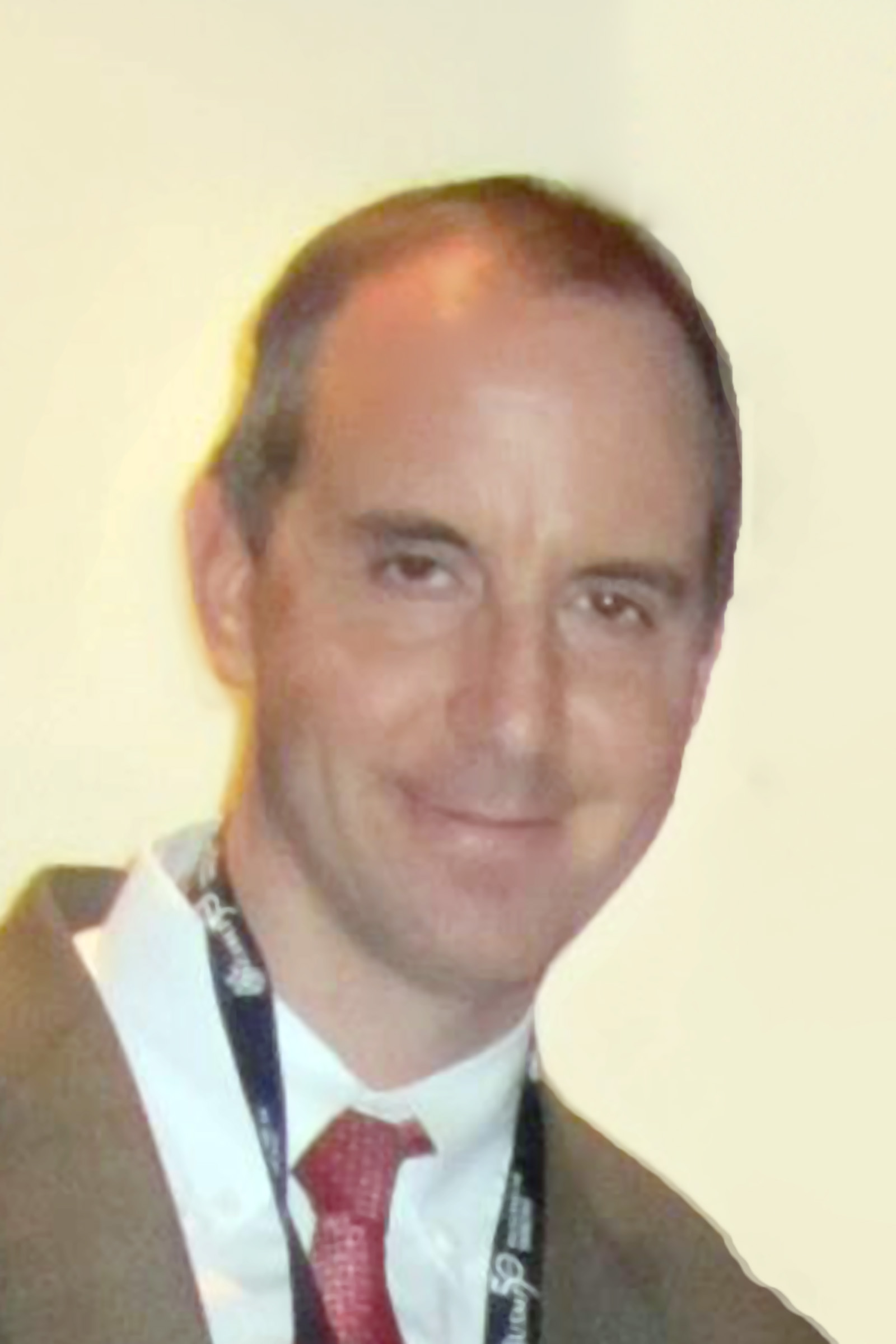
- Born: Eric Andrew Posner; December 5, 1965 (age 60)
- Father: Richard Posner

Academic background
- Education: Yale University (BA, MA); Harvard University (JD)

Academic work
- Discipline: International law, law and economics, contract law
- Institutions: University of Chicago

Eric Andrew Posner (/ˈpoʊznər/; born December 5, 1965) is an American lawyer and legal scholar. As a law professor at the University of Chicago Law School, Posner has taught international law, contract law, and bankruptcy, among other areas. He is the son of the late Seventh Circuit Judge Richard Posner.

== Education ==
Posner attended Yale University, earning B.A. and M.A. degrees in philosophy, summa cum laude. He then received his J.D. degree, magna cum laude, from Harvard Law School in 1991. He clerked for Judge Stephen F. Williams of the D.C. Circuit.

== Career ==
Posner started his teaching career at the University of Pennsylvania Law School from 1993 to 1998. In 1998, Posner joined the University of Chicago Law School, where he is now the Kirkland and Ellis Distinguished Service Professor of Law and Esther Kane Research Chair. He has also been a visiting professor at Columbia Law School and NYU School of Law. From 1998 to 2011, he was an editor of The Journal of Legal Studies. He is the author or co-author of many books and articles, on subjects including international law, cost-benefit analysis, and constitutional law. At Chicago he teaches Antitrust, Contracts, Public International Law, and Financial Regulation, amongst other courses. Beginning in 2022, Posner began service as Counsel to the Assistant Attorney General for Antitrust at the United States Department of Justice.

== Work ==
Posner's published books have ranged over topics including international law, foreign relations law, contracts, and game theory and the law. In 2005, Posner posted about the trial of the deposed Iraqi President Saddam Hussein.

In June 2013, Posner and Jameel Jaffer, fellow at the Open Society Foundations, participated in The New York Times Room for Debate series. Posner responded to concerns about expanded National Security Agency (NSA) programs that vacuum information about the private lives of American citizens. Those who oppose the surveillance claim that the collection and storing of unlimited metadata is a highly invasive form of surveillance of citizens' communications. Posner claimed that Americans obtain the services they want by disclosing private information to strangers such as doctors and insurance companies. Posner in 2013 argued that since 2001 there had not been a single instance of "war-on-terror-related surveillance in which the government used information obtained for security purposes to target a political opponent, dissenter or critic".

In 2015, Posner co-founded the book review The New Rambler. Posner's position concerning the heightened standing of the executive branch of government was criticized in 2016 by Jeremy Waldron in his book Political Political Theory as not sufficiently sensitive to issue of legislative priorities. In 2018, Posner co-wrote an article advocating a system of market-oriented, privately sponsored work visas as a supplement to U.S. immigration policy.

=== Law and Emotions ===
Posner has argued for increased attention towards the role of emotions in legal theory. In 2001, Posner's Law and the Emotions detailed the implications of emotional decision making in legal decisions and procedures, as well as in rational choice theory. In particular, he argues that the American legal system's deeply rooted basis in cognitive science often eschews, or has yet to develop, significant acknowledgement of the role emotions play in criminology and contract theory. For example, a person who commits a criminal act while in an emotional state may receive a harsher or lighter punishment depending on whether they were motivated by hatred or shame. Indeed, consideration of the emotional component is often systemic or even codified, but any analysis thereof has been historically ignored.

==== Rational choice theory ====
Posner claims that a person who is in an emotional state rarely acts on reflex, instead remaining in control of their actions. Though the actions of an individual may be colored by a changing set of values, abilities, and preferences particular to their emotional state, these actions nonetheless remain guided in a procedural manner. Therefore, the mere observation that an individual's preferences are usually consistent while calm does not invalidate the role of rationality throughout the more temporary preferences of each emotional state. In other words, while emotional preferences modify the action tendency of any set of possible behaviors, the cognitive decision to commit to an action is nevertheless bound by reason.

== Selected bibliography ==
=== Books ===
- Law and Social Norms (Harvard University Press, 2000). ISBN 0-674-00814-6
- The Limits of International Law (Oxford University Press, 2005) (with Jack Goldsmith). ISBN 0-19-516839-9
- Terror in the Balance: Security, Liberty, and the Courts (Oxford University Press, 2007) (with Adrian Vermeule). ISBN 0-19-531025-X
- Perils of Global Legalism (University of Chicago Press, 2009) ISBN 0-226-67574-2
- Law and Happiness (University of Chicago Press, 2010) ISBN 0-226-67600-5
- Climate Change Justice (Princeton University Press, 2010) (with David Weisbach) ISBN 0-691-13775-7
- The Executive Unbound: After the Madisonian Republic (with Adrian Vermeule)(Oxford University Press 2011) ISBN 0-19-976533-2,
- Contract Law and Theory (Aspen 2011) ISBN 1-4548-1071-8
- Economic Foundations of International Law (Harvard 2013) (with Alan Sykes) ISBN 0674066995
- The Twilight of Human Rights Law (Oxford University Press 2014) ISBN 978-0199313440
- Radical Markets (Princeton University Press 2018) ISBN 9780691177502 (with E. Glen Weyl)
- Last Resort: The Financial Crisis and the Future Bailouts (University of Chicago Press, 2018) ISBN 978-0-226-42006-6
- The Demagogue's Playbook: The Battle for American Democracy from the Founders to Trump (All Points Books, 2020) ISBN 9781250303035

=== Articles ===
- "Understanding the Resemblance Between Modern and Traditional Customary International Law", 40 Va. J. Int'l Law 639 (2000; with Jack L. Goldsmith)
- "Law and the Emotions", 89 Georgetown Law Journal 1977 (2001)
- "Moral and Legal Rhetoric in International Relations: A Rational Choice Perspective", 31 J. Legal Stud. S115 (2002; with Jack Goldsmith)
- "Do States Have a Moral Obligation to Comply with International Law?", 55 Stan. L. Rev. 1901 (2003)
- "A Theory of the Laws of War", 70 U. Chi. L. Rev. 297 (2003)
- "Transnational Legal Process and the Supreme Court's 2003–2004 Term: Some Skeptical Observations", 12 Tulsa Journal of Comparative and International Law 23 (2004)
- "Judicial Independence in International Tribunals", 93 Cal. L. Rev. 1 (2005; with John Yoo)
- "Optimal War and Jus ad Bellum", 93 Georgetown L.J. 993 (2005) (with Alan Sykes)
- "Terrorism and the Laws of War", 5 Chi. J. Int'l L. 423 (2005)
- "International Law and the Disaggregated State", 32 Fla. St. U. L. Rev. 797 (2005)
- "International Law and the Rise of China", 7 Chi. J. Int'l L. 1 (2006; with John Yoo)
- "International Law: A Welfarist Approach", 73 U. Chi. L. Rev. 487 (2006)
- "An Economic Analysis of State and Individual Responsibility Under International Law", Amer. L. & Econ. Rev. (forthcoming; with Alan Sykes)
- "Deference to the Executive in the United States after September 11: Congress, the Courts, and the Office of Legal Counsel," 35 Harvard Journal of Law and Public Policy 213 (2012).
- "Is the International Court of Justice Biased?," J. Legal Stud. (forthcoming) (with Miguel de Figueiredo).

=== Newspaper columns ===
- "Judges v. Trump: Be Careful What You Wish For," The New York Times, February 15, 2017
- "A Threat That Belongs Behind Bars," The New York Times, June 25, 2006
- "Apply the Golden Rule to al Qaeda?", The Wall Street Journal, July 15, 2006, p. A9
- "Bitcoin is a Ponzi scheme—the Internet's favorite currency will collapse", Slate Magazine, April 11, 2013

== Personal life ==
He has a wife and two children. He is a son of the former United States Court of Appeals for the Seventh Circuit judge Richard Posner.
