= Quadratic voting =

Collective decision-making procedure

Quadratic voting (QV) is a voting system that encourages voters to express their true relative intensity of preference (utility) between multiple options or elections. By doing so, quadratic voting seeks to mitigate tyranny of the majority—where minority preferences are by default repressed since under majority rule, majority cooperation is needed to make any change. Quadratic voting prevents this by allowing voters to vote multiple times on one option at the cost of not being able to vote as much on other options. This enables minority issues to be addressed where the minority has a sufficiently strong preference relative to the majority (since motivated minorities can vote multiple times) while also disincentivizing extremism or putting all votes on one issue (since additional votes require increasing sacrifice of influence over other issues).

In quadratic voting, voters allocate "credits" (usually distributed equally, though some suggest using real money) to various issues. The number of votes to add is determined by a quadratic cost function, which means that the number of votes a person casts for a given issue is equal to the square root of the number of credits they allocate (put another way, to add 3 votes requires allocating the square or quadratic of the number of votes, i.e., 9 credits). Because the quadratic cost function makes each additional vote more expensive (to go from 2 votes to 3, you must allocate 5 extra credits, but to go from 3 to 4, you must add 7), voters are incentivized not to over-allocate to a single issue and instead to spread their credits across multiple issues to make better use of them. This creates voting outcomes more closely aligned with a voter's true relative expected utility between options. Compared to score voting or cumulative voting, where voters may simply not vote for any option other than their favorite, QV gives voters who more accurately represent their preferences across multiple options more overall votes than those who don't.

Vote pricing example
Number of votes	"Vote credit" cost
1	1
2	4
3	9
4	16
5	25

== Properties of quadratic voting ==
=== Efficiency ===
The quadratic cost function uniquely enables people to purchase votes in a way that reflects the strength of their preferences proportionally. As a result, the total votes cast on a given issue will correspond to the intensity of preferences among voters, effectively balancing the collective outcome according to both the direction and strength of individual preferences. This occurs because the marginal cost of each additional vote increases linearly with the number of votes cast. If the marginal cost increased less than linearly, someone who values the issue twice as much might buy disproportionately more votes, predisposing the system to favor intense special interests with concentrated preferences. This results in a "one-dollar-one-vote" dynamic, where marginal costs remain constant. Conversely, if the cost function rises faster than quadratically, it leads voters to limit themselves to a single vote, pushing the system toward majority rule where only the number of voters matters, rather than the intensity of preference.

Quadratic voting is based upon market principles, where each voter is given a budget of vote credits that they have the personal decisions and delegation to spend in order to influence the outcome of a range of decisions. If a participant has a strong support for or against a specific decision, additional votes could be allocated to proportionally demonstrate the voter's support. A vote pricing rule determines the cost of additional votes, with each vote becoming increasingly more expensive. By increasing voter credit costs, this demonstrates an individual's support and interests toward the particular decision.

By contrast, majority rule based on individual person voting has the potential to lead to focus on only the most popular policies, so smaller policies would not be placed on as much significance. The larger proportion of voters who vote for a policy even with lesser passion compared to the minority proportion of voters who have higher preferences in a less popular topic can lead to a reduction of aggregate welfare. In addition, the complicating structures of contemporary democracy with institutional self-checking (i.e., federalism, separation of powers) will continue to expand its policies, so quadratic voting is responsible for correcting any significant changes of one-person-one-vote policies.

=== Robustness ===
Robustness of a voting system can be defined as how sensitive a voting scheme is to non-ideal behavior from either voters or outside influence. The robustness of QV with respect to various non-idealities has been studied, including collusion among voters, outside attacks on the voting process, and irrationality of the voters. Collusion is possible in most voting schemes to one extent or another, and what is key is the sensitivity of the voting scheme to collusion. It has been shown that QV exhibits similar sensitivity to collusion as one-person-one-vote systems, and is much less sensitive to collusion than the VCG or Groves and Ledyard mechanisms. Proposals have been put forward to make QV more robust with respect to both collusion and outside attacks. The effects of voter irrationality and misconceptions on QV results have been examined critically by QV by a number of authors. QV has been shown to be less sensitive to 'underdog effects' than one-person-one-vote. When the election is not close, QV has also been shown to be efficient in the face of a number of deviations from perfectly rational behavior, including voters believing vote totals are signals in and of themselves, voters using their votes to express themselves personally, and voter belief that their votes are more pivotal than they actually are. Although such irrational behavior can cause inefficiency in closer elections, the efficiency gains through preference expression are often sufficient to make QV net beneficial compared to one-person-one-vote systems. Some distortionary behaviors can occur for QV in small populations due to people stoking issues to get more return for themselves, but this issue has not been shown to be a practical issue for larger populations. Due to QV allowing people to express preferences continuously, it has been proposed that QV may be more sensitive than one-person-one-vote to social movements that instill misconceptions or otherwise alter voters' behavior away from rationality in a coordinated manner.

The quadratic nature of the voting suggests that a voter can use their votes more efficiently by spreading them across many issues. For example, a voter with a budget of 16 vote credits can apply 1 vote credit to each of the 16 issues. However, if the individual has a stronger passion or sentiment on an issue, they could allocate 4 votes, at the cost of 16 credits, to the singular issue, using up their entire budget.

== History of quadratic voting ==
One of the earliest known models idealizing quadratic voting was proposed by 3 scientists: William Vickrey, Edward H. Clarke, and Theodore Groves. Together they theorized the Vickrey–Clarke–Groves mechanism (VCG mechanism). The purpose of this mechanism was to find the balance between being a transparent, easy-to-understand function that the market could understand in addition to being able to calculate and charge the specific price of any resource. This balance could then theoretically act as motivation for users to not only honestly declare their utilities, but also charge them the correct price. This theory was easily able to be applied into a voting system that could allow people to cast votes while presenting the intensity of their preference. However, much like the majority of the other voting systems proposed during this time, it proved to be too difficult to understand, vulnerable to cheating, weak equilibria, and other impractical deficiencies. As this concept continued developing, E. Glen Weyl, a Microsoft researcher, applied the concept to democratic politics and corporate governance and coining the phrase Quadratic Voting.

The main motivation of Weyl to create a quadratic voting model was to combat against the "tyranny of the majority" outcome that is a direct result of the majority-rule model. He believed the two main problems of the majority-rule model are that it doesn't always advance the public good and it weakens democracy. The stable majority has always been systematically benefited at the direct expense of minorities. On the other hand, even hypothetically if the majority wasn't to be concentrated in a single group, tyranny of the majority would still exist because a social group will still be exploited. Therefore, Weyl concluded that this majority rule system will always cause social harm. He also believed another reason is that the majority rule system weakens democracy. Historically, to discourage political participation of minorities, the majority doesn't hesitate to set legal or physical barriers. As a result, this success of a temporary election is causing democratic institutions to weaken around the world.

To combat this, Weyl developed the quadratic voting model and its application to democratic politics. The model theoretically optimizes social welfare by allowing everyone the chance to vote equally on a proposal as well as giving the minority the opportunity to buy more votes to level out the playing field.

=== Ideation in corporate governance ===
Quadratic voting in corporate governance is aimed to optimize corporate values through the use of a more fair voting system. Common issues with shareholder voting includes blocking out policies that may benefit the corporate value but don't benefit their shareholder value or having the majority commonly outvote the minority. This poor corporate governance could easily contribute to detrimental financial crises.

With quadratic voting, not only are shareholders stripped of their voting rights, but instead corporate employees can buy as many votes as they want and participate in electoral process. Using the quadratic voting model, one vote would be $1, while two votes would be $4, and so on. The collected money gets transferred to the treasury where it gets distributed to the shareholders. To combat voter fraud, the votes are confidential and collusion is illegal. With this, not only is the majority shareholders' power against the minority stripped, but with the participation of everyone, it ensures that the policies are made for the corporate's best interest instead of the shareholders' best interest.

=== Payment ===
The most common objection to QV, are that if it uses real currency (as opposed to a uniformly distributed artificial currency) it efficiently selects the outcome for which the population has the highest willingness to pay. Willingness to pay, however, is not directly proportional to the utility gained by the voting population. For example, if those who are wealthy can afford to buy more votes relative to the rest of the population, this would distort voting outcomes to favor the wealthy in situations where voting is polarized on the basis of wealth. (Note: More formally, willingness to pay is approximately the utility gain experienced by the individual voting normalized by the marginal utility of money. The marginal utility of money decreasing with increasing wealth, and therefore willingness to pay is inflated for wealthy individuals.)

Several alternative proposals have been put forward to counter this concern, with the most popular being QV with an artificial currency. Usually, the artificial currency is distributed on a uniform basis, thus giving every individual an equal say, but allowing individuals to more flexibly align their voting behavior with their preferences. While many have objected to QV with real currency, there has been fairly broad-based approval of QV with an artificial currency.

Other proposed methods for ameliorating objections to the use of money in real currency QV are:

- To reduce or eliminate the unequal representation due to wealth, QV could be coupled with a scheme that returns incomes from the QV process to the less-wealthy. One such scheme is proposed to by Weyl and Posner.
- For situations where issues are polarized based on wealth, one-person-one-vote may be a better alternative, depending on how gains in efficiency from preference expression balance with distortions due to wealth polarization. The use of QV vs one-person-one-vote could be determined on an issue-by-issue basis.
- Votes could be made more expensive to wealthy voters either for all issues, or for issues which are polarized on the basis of wealth.

== Applications ==
=== United States ===
Many areas have been proposed for quadratic voting, including corporate governance in the private sector, allocating budgets, cost-benefit analyses for public goods, more accurate polling and sentiment data, and elections and other democratic decisions.

Quadratic voting was conducted in an experiment by the Democratic caucus of the Colorado House of Representatives in April 2019. Lawmakers used it to decide on their legislative priorities for the coming two years, selecting among 107 possible bills. Each member was given 100 virtual tokens that would allow them to put either 10 votes on one bill (as 100 virtual tokens represented 10 votes for one bill) or 5 votes each (25 virtual tokens) on 4 different bills. In the end, the winner was Senate Bill 85, the Equal Pay for Equal Work Act, with a total of 60 votes. From this demonstration of quadratic voting, no representative spent all 100 tokens on a single bill, and there was delineation between the discussion topics that were the favorites and also-rans. The computer interface and systematic structure was contributed by Democracy Earth, which is an open-source liquid democracy platform to foster governmental transparency.

=== Taiwan ===
The first use of quadratic voting in Taiwan was hosted by RadicalxChange in Taipei, where quadratic voting was used to vote in the Taiwanese presidential Hackathon. The Hackathon projects revolved around 'Cooperative Plurality' – the concept of discovering the richness of diversity that is repressed through human cooperation. Judges were given 99 points with 1 vote costing 1 point and 2 votes costing 4 points and so on. This stopped the follow-up effect and group influenced decision that happened with judges in previous years. This event was considered a successful application of quadratic voting.

=== Germany ===
In Leipzig, Germany, Volt Germany, the national chapter of Volt Europa, a progressive and federalist European political alliance, held its second party congress and used quadratic voting to determine the most valued topics in their party manifesto among its members. Partner with Deora, Leapdao, a technology start-up company, launched its quadratic voting software consisting of a "burner wallet". Since there was limited time and it was a closed environment, the "burner wallet" with a QR code acted as a private key that allowed congress to access their pre-funded wallet and a list of all the proposals on the voting platform. The event was considered a success because it successfully generated a priority list that ranked the importance of the topics.

Quadratic voting also allowed researchers to analyze voter distributions. For example, the topic of Education showed especially high or emotional value to voters with the majority deciding to cast 4 or 9 voice-credits (2 or 3 votes) and a minority casting 25-49 voice-credits (5-7 votes). On the other hand, the topic of Renewed Economy showed a more typical distribution with a majority of voters either not vote or max out at 9 voice-credits (3 votes). This indicates that there are less emotionally invested voters on this proposal as many of them didn't even spend tokens to vote on it.

=== Brazil ===
In Brazil, the city council of Gramado has used quadratic voting to define priorities for the year and to reach consensus on tax amendments.

== Quadratic funding ==
Vitalik Buterin in collaboration with Zoë Hitzig and E. Glen Weyl proposed quadratic funding, a way to allocate the distribution of funds (for example, from a government's budget, a philanthropic source, or collected directly from participants) based on quadratic voting, noting that such a mechanism allows for optimal production of public goods without needing to be determined by a centralized legislature. Weyl argues that this fills a gap with traditional free markets – which encourage the production of goods and services for the benefit of individuals, but fail to create outcomes desirable to society as a whole – while still benefiting from the flexibility and diversity free markets have compared to many government programs.

The Gitcoin Grants initiative is an early adopter of quadratic funding. However, this implementation differs in several ways from the original QF scheme. Led by Kevin Owocki, Scott Moore, and Vivek Singh, the initiative has distributed more than $60,000,000 to over 3,000 open-source software development projects as of 2022.

== See also ==
- Cardinal voting
- Cumulative voting
- Liquid democracy
- Mechanism design
- Penrose method
- Vickrey–Clarke–Groves mechanism
