= Cornelius Clarkson Vermeule II =

American government official

Major Cornelius Clarkson Vermeule II (September 26, 1895 – August 7, 1943) was the director of the Public Works Administration in New Jersey, United States. He also succeeded his father, Cornelius Clarkson Vermeule Sr., as Engineer in Charge of the decommissioning and dismantlement of the Morris Canal.

== Biography ==
He was born to Cornelius Clarkson Vermeule I on September 26, 1895. He married Catherine Sayre (née Comstock) December 3, 1921. They had one child, the renowned art historian Cornelius Clarkson Vermeule III, in Orange, New Jersey, on August 10, 1925.

Vermeule continued his father's work with the government of the state of New Jersey, holding several positions over time and serving a pivotal role in the dismantlement and preservation of the Morris Canal.

In 1934, Vermeule Jr. was issued the Distinguished Service Medal by the United States Department of War in for his "great courage and daring" staying on the line for three successive periods during the battle of Meuse-Argonne as a Major with the Machine Gun Company of the 320th Regiment, 80th Division, in World War I.

A resident of East Orange, New Jersey, Cornelius C. Vermeule Jr's body was found in Hoboken aboard a ferry on August 7, 1943, where he is believed to have taken his own life with a revolver.

== Career ==
Cornelius C. Vermeule Sr. resigned from his post as consulting and directing engineer of the dismantlement of the Morris Canal and Banking Company and on April 7, 1924, was succeeded by Vermeule Jr.

Vermeule Jr. completed the work and submitted his final report on June 29, 1929. This report is considered to be one of the most important sources of technical information, photos, and history of the Morris Canal.
