= Association for Law, Property and Society =

The Association for Law, Property and Society is a scholarly organization based in the United States for researching engaging in the study of property law and social issues. The association hosts an annual conference, the first of which occurred at Georgetown Law in 2010, and is also the publisher of the journal Law, Property and Society. The current president of the association is Tim Mulvaney of Texas A&M University.
