= Samuel Zemurray, Jr. and Doris Zemurray Stone-Radcliffe Professor =

Endowed chair at Harvard

The Samuel Zemurray, Jr. and Doris Zemurray Stone-Radcliffe Professor is the first endowed chair at Harvard University created specifically to be filled by a woman.

== History ==
In 1947, Samuel Zemurray, an American businessman, gave Harvard University $225,000 to $250,000 to establish an endowed professorship for “a distinguished woman scholar” to be selected by a University committee. Zemurray gave the money to Harvard in honor of Zemurray’s children, Samuel Zemurray, Jr. and Doris Zemurray Stone.

Samuel Zemurray, Jr., was a graduate of the Harvard Business School who was killed in World War II. Doris Zemurray Stone was a graduate of Radcliffe. This professorship was one of many endowed professorships the Zemurray Foundation provided for universities across the United States.

Rather than establishing the professorship in a specific field of academic study, Zemurray chose to honor of his daughter by designating the professorship for a female candidate of academic renown. This allowed the Samuel Zemurray, Jr. and Doris Zemurray Stone-Radcliffe Professor to work across disciplines, much like Harvard’s University Professors.

== List of professors ==
- Helen Maud Cam, 1947–1954, professor of English constitutional history
- Cora du Bois, 1954–1968, professor of anthropology
- Emily Vermeule, 1970–1994, professor of archaeology
- Katharine Park, 1997–present, professor of the history of science
- Amanda Claybaugh, 2010–present, professor of English
