= Richard H. Helmholz =

American law professor

Richard H. Helmholz (born 1940) is the Ruth Wyatt Rosenson Distinguished Service Professor of Law at the University of Chicago Law School. He received his LL.B. from Harvard Law School in 1965 and also earned an A.B. in French literature at Princeton University, and a Ph.D. in medieval history from the University of California at Berkeley.

== Career ==
He is a member of the Selden Society Council and a fellow of the American Academy of Arts & Sciences and a corresponding fellow of the British Academy. Before moving to the University of Chicago, he spent ten years at Washington University in St. Louis, where he was a professor of law and history. He is best known for his work on the influence of canon law on the common law.

His scholarship was cited by Justice David Souter's majority opinion in the 2004 Supreme Court case Sosa v. Alvarez-Machain et al., 542 U.S. 692.

He teaches property, European legal history, and the law of oil and gas. In 2000–01, Helmholz was the Arthur Goodhart Visiting Professor of Legal Science at the University of Cambridge and in Fall 2005, he was a visiting professor at Harvard Law School.

== Selected authored books ==
- Natural Law in Court http://www.hup.harvard.edu/catalog.php?isbn=9780674504585.
- Marriage Litigation in Medieval England (Cambridge University Press, 1974).
- Canon Law and English Common Law (Selden Society, 1983).
- The History of the Canon Law and Ecclesiastical Jurisdiction, 597-1649 (Oxford University Press, 2003)
- Roman Canon Law in Reformation England (Cambridge University Press, 2004).
- The Spirit of Classical Canon Law (3rd ed.) (University of Georgia Press, 2010).
