= Action tendency =

Psychological urge to act in a particular manner

Action tendency is a psychological term in behavioural science, which refers to an individual's urge to carry out a particular behaviour, particularly as a component of emotion. It represents a person’s initial compulsion for goal-directed behaviour in response to environmental stimuli, directly addressing the emotions experienced.

Importantly, action tendencies do not guarantee that a behaviour will occur. Instead, they serve as effective predictors of how emotions guide actions, showcasing patterns of readiness to engage or avoid situations depending on the emotional context. In behavioural science, an individual's emotions direct their response to current circumstances or relationships; thus, the action tendency, as a constituent factor of the individual's overall emotional responsivity, is a temporary and immediate impulse.

== Role of emotions ==
There are several distinct emotions - such as joy, sadness, fear, disgust, and anger – that form actions tendencies including approach, inaction, withdrawal, and attack. Emotional valence – whether the experienced emotion is positive or negative – arises from the measure of congruency between an individuals’ goals and their environment. Environments that support goal attainment typically elicit positive emotions and approach behaviours. Conversely, environments that limit resources necessary for goal achievement, activate negative emotions and avoidance behaviours.

However, action tendencies are not fixed. They are immediate suggestions for a response in a particular set of circumstances, informed by an individual's set of preferences at the current point in time, which are supplied elsewhere within the emotion. Action tendency, therefore, changes as an individual moves between emotional states, and is modified by the individual's present cognitive and physiological abilities. The same emotion can lead to different action tendencies explaining why emotional responses do not always translate into consistent behaviours.

== Formation ==
Action tendencies develop from the interaction between emotional experience, physiological responses, and cognitive processes

=== Biological and cognitive foundations ===
Biologically, action urges are part of evolved survival mechanisms, preparing the body to rapidly adapt and respond to environmental challenges. As the motivational component of emotional decision making, action tendencies are responsible for the preparation and direction of motor responses. Under the emotional framework, motivation can be thought of as the state of readiness to engage in a certain action with the goal of achieving a desired result. The action tendency is distinct from cognitive, physiological, and expressive components, which likewise determine an individual's behaviour.

- Survival mechanisms: A key example is the Fight-or-Flight response induced by fear. This activates the sympathetic nervous system, realising hormones like adrenaline and cortisol, to prepare the body to either attack (fight) or escape (flight) the perceived threat. These physiological changes create a readiness to act shaped by an internal risk assessment to select the most effective behavioural strategy for the situation.
- Regulatory drives: The hypothalamus plays a central role in regulating motivational drives that underlie action tendencies. Its interaction with the automatic nervous system and endocrine system helps maintain homeostasis and regulate essential survival-based motivations. These drives are essential in adjusting goal priorities that are more likely to support survival in response to the changing environmental conditions.
- Reward system: The brain’s reward system, particularly the mesolimbic pathway, reinforces action tendencies. When a behaviour leads to a desirable outcome, dopamine is released, reinforcing the relationship between the stimulus and associated behaviour. Repeated pairings form learned associations, increasing the probability that specific emotional contexts trigger similar behavioural impulses. However, reinforcement can also promote counterproductive behavioural tendencies, such as addiction, where excessive dopamine release creates ‘super-learning’ cues. An unreactive reward system may motivate individuals to seek greater stimulation through antisocial behaviours, reinforcing reward-seeking action tendencies that relieve unpleasant states.

=== Learning action tendencies ===
Action tendencies can be learnt through conditioning. Repeated exposure to similar emotional environments and appraisals teaches individuals which behaviours are most effective or rewarding. This learning creates expectations about future events, resulting in the experience of ‘anticipated emotions’ which motivate behaviour before the emotion is felt. Baumgartner, Pieters and Bagozzi (2008) argued that, through common patterns of experience, individuals display preferences to select actions that are predicted to generate positive emotions and avoid negative ones. Action tendencies, therefore, may not solely arise from immediate emotional experiences but also caused by the expectation about an emotional outcome.

Several theories and experiments support the notion that action tendencies can be primed to produce a desired result before the onset of emotion. For example, a 2010 experiment trained addicts to either approach or avoid alcohol, finding that the subjects' action tendency towards alcohol was positively affected in accordance with the training condition.

== Appraisal theory and action tendencies ==
Appraisal theory argues that emotions stem from an individual’s subjective evaluation of events in relation to personal goals. Emotional evaluations determine how learned appraisals manifest into specific action tendencies. As emotions become conceptualised through appraisal, behavioural urges reflect a person’s interpretation of the environment, distinguishing whether a particular behavioural response is compatible with the situation. Situations appraised as motive-consistent – those that align with personal goals - elicit positive emotions, creating impulses to seek more of the stimuli. Motive inconsistent situations elicit negative emotions, where impulses experienced are aimed to reduce the stimuli.

However, the relationship between emotional valence and action tendency is not always congruent. Appraised intensity and emotional salience also influence the activation of actions. For example, although fear is perceived to have a negative valance, it can evoke approach (fight) or withdrawal (flight) tendencies, depending on the perceived threat intensity. Lower to moderate intensity fear leads to attack tendencies, whereas high intensity fear results in flee tendencies.

=== Approach and withdrawal tendencies ===
Charles Darwin (1872), in “The Expressions of the Emotion in Man and Animals”, proposed action tendencies as generally falling under two main categories: approach and withdrawal.

- Approach tendency: Guide behaviour towards rewarding stimuli. Commonly associated with positive emotions and motive-consistent appraisals. Approach-related emotions include joy, excitement, and sometimes anger.
- Withdrawal tendency: Guide behaviour away from potential harm and reject undesirable stimuli. Commonly associated with negative emotions and motive-inconsistent appraisals. Withdrawal-related emotions include fear, disgust, and sadness.

==== Two cognitive systems maintain action tendency activation ====
- The Behavioural Activation System (BAS): Responds to reward cues, predisposing individuals to approach behaviours.
- The Behavioural Inhibition System (BIS): Responds to punishment or novelty cues, predisposing individuals to avoidance or inhibiting behaviours.

Neuroimaging studies show the left frontal cortex links to approach tendencies (BAS), while the right frontal cortex links to withdrawal tendencies (BIS).

=== Cognitive and social regulation ===
The activation, suppression, and regulation of action tendencies are influenced by cognitive, social, and contextual factors. One primary regulatory mechanism is cognitive reappraisal – the ability to reinterpret emotionally-inducing events to align with personal goals. This mechanism allows individuals to adjust emotional impulses prior to the full onset of a reaction. Studies show it effectively reduces negative emotions and promote positive emotions to generate more socially appropriate tendencies.

Social environments and cultural norms also shape cognitive responses to emotional events. Social Identity Theory argues individuals internalise the beliefs and behaviours of their in-groups – groups they identify with – creating strong desires to perform actions that reinforce conformity to group norms. For instance, while anger may promote aggressive, confrontational urges, societal norms and law-compliance often inhibit these behaviours. This is often mediated by fear of punishment or reputational damage that override antisocial tendencies.

Perceived action tendency may also play a role in social conditioning and self-esteem which is observable at an early developmental stage. In 1979, experimental data demonstrated that children who self-reported more frequent assertive and aggressive tendencies experienced lower self-image and negative social stigma. These findings suggest that the self-observation of behavioural tendencies plays a significant role in the construction of identity and the regulation of behaviour.

However, highly irrational emotions present a harder regulatory challenge, evident in psychological disorders like depression, anxiety and panic, where involuntary emotions govern action tendencies. This can lead individuals to act on irrational and antisocial urges driven by unregulated emotional states.

== See also ==
- Determination
- Behaviourism
- Behavioural change theories
- Emotion and culture
- Emotional self-regulation
- Emotional dysregulation
- Emotional expression
- Self-preservation
- Goal setting
- Motivational therapy
- Motivational Interviewing
- Instinct
- Normality (behaviour)
