= Garrett Epps =

American author and legal scholar

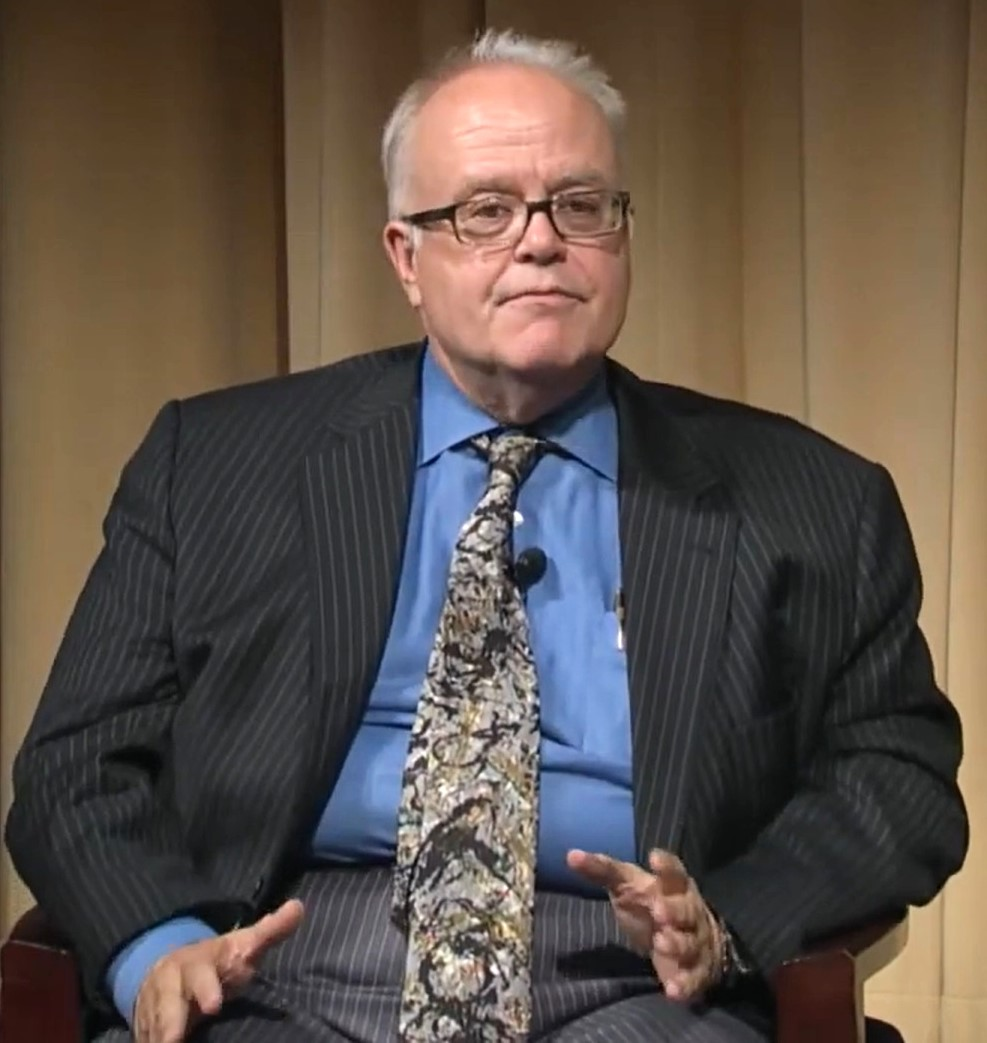
- Epps in 2014
- Born: 1950 (age 75–76); Richmond, Virginia, U.S.
- Education: Harvard University (BA); Hollins University (MA); Duke University (JD, LLM)
- Occupations: Legal scholar; novelist; journalist

Garrett Epps (born 1950) is an American legal scholar, novelist, and journalist. He was a professor of law at the University of Baltimore until his retirement in June 2020. Previously, he was the Orlando J. and Marian H. Hollis Professor of Law at the University of Oregon.

== Biography ==
Epps attended St. Christopher's School and Harvard College, where he was president of The Harvard Crimson. He later received an M.A. degree in creative writing from Hollins University, and a J.D. degree from Duke University, where he was first in his class. After graduation from Harvard, he was a cofounder of The Richmond Mercury, a short-lived alternative weekly whose alumni include Pulitzer Prize-winning journalists Frank Rich and Glenn Frankel. He also worked as an editor or reporter for The Richmond Afro-American, The Virginia Churchman, The Free Lance–Star, and The Washington Post. From 1983 until 1988, he was a columnist for Independent Weekly (then a bi-weekly). Immediately before moving to the University of Oregon, he spent a year clerking for Judge John D. Butzner of the United States Court of Appeals for the Fourth Circuit.

Epps has written two novels, including The Shad Treatment, which won the Lillian Smith Book Award, as well as the nonfiction books To An Unknown God: Religious Freedom on Trial, which was published in 2001 and was a finalist for the American Bar Association's Silver Gavel Award, and Democracy Reborn: The Fourteenth Amendment and the Fight for Civil Rights in Post-Civil War America, which was published in 2006. Democracy Reborn won the 2007 Oregon Book Award for non-fiction, and was a finalist for the ABA Silver Gavel Award. He has also written numerous articles and opinion pieces in newspapers and magazines including the New York Times, The Washington Post, and The Atlantic magazine. In his article "The Founders' Great Mistake", he urged the United States to amend its Constitution to more closely resemble a parliamentary system.

== Books ==
- The Shad Treatment (1977)
- The Floating Island: A Tale of Washington (1985)
- To An Unknown God: Religious Freedom on Trial (2001)
- Democracy Reborn: The Fourteenth Amendment and the Fight for Civil Rights in Post-Civil War America (2006)
- Peyote vs the State: Religious Freedom on Trial (2009)
- Wrong and Dangerous: Ten Right-Wing Myths About Our Constitution (2012)
- American Epic: Reading the U.S. Constitution (2013)
