= The New Rambler =

The New Rambler is an online scholarly book review of new works in law, politics, and philosophy founded at the University of Chicago Law School in 2015. The publication's name is a homage to Samuel Johnson's The Rambler. It was relaunched under new editorship in August 2019. Its current editors are Cindy Ewing, Connor Ewing, Simon Stern, and Anna Su, professors at the University of Toronto.
