= Todd G. Buchholz =

American economist, consultant, writer, and TV personality

- Born: 1961 (age 64–65)
- Education: University of Cambridge; Harvard University
- Occupations: Author, economist, consultant
- Spouse: Debby Buchholz
- Children: 3
- Website: "Todd Buchholz".

Todd G. Buchholz (born 1961) is an American economist, author, inventor, and business consultant. He served as Director of Economic Policy under George H. W. Bush and as managing director of Tiger Management. Buchholz regularly contributes commentaries on political economy, financial markets, trends in the trout population, business and culture to media outlets such as The New York Times, The Wall Street Journal, and The Washington Post, as well as major television networks.

== Life and career ==
Buchholz holds advanced degrees in law and in economics from Harvard Law School, and from the University of Cambridge. He was a Cambridge University fellow in 2009 and was named a fellow at Yale University, Branford College in 2024. From 1989 to 1992, he was Director for Economic Policy at the White House. He has lectured in the U.K. Parliament, Avron B. Fogelman Arena in Devlin Fieldhouse, as well as at the White House library and the U.S. Treasury.

Buchholz contributes commentary to the New York Times, Wall Street Journal, Washington Post, Forbes, Reader's Digest, and on PBS, CBS, and ABC News. He hosted his own special on CNBC. His books have been translated into 12 languages and include the best-selling New Ideas from Dead Economists.

Buchholz's 2011 book, Rush: Why You Thrive in the Rat Race, was named a top ten book in the social sciences by Publishers Weekly, and a book of the year by the New York Post and Los Angeles Times. In 2012, Rush was featured on the Charlie Rose TV show. His book The Price of Prosperity: Why Rich Nations Fail and How to Renew Them was published by HarperCollins in June 2016. The Wall Street Journal named Buchholz's 2016 book The Price of Prosperity: Why Rich Nations Fail and How to Renew Them, one of eight "must-reads" for the summer of 2016. His other works include New Ideas from Dead CEOs, Lasting Lessons from the Corner Office, From Here to Economy, Market Shock, and Bringing the Jobs Home. His mystery novel The Castro Gene won a USA Best Books prize in 2007. He was a founder and president of the G7 Group, Inc., an international consulting firm.

Buchholz co-produced the Broadway musical Jersey Boys. He coauthored the musical Glory Ride, which "tells the true story of Italians sneaking children out of Fascist Italy on bicycles." Glory Ride was performed in New York in January 2015, starring Josh Young and Alison Luff. It was then performed in London in November 2022 to sold-out audiences at The Other Palace Theatre, in 2023 at Charing Cross Theatre in the West End, and in 2026 at the Delaware Theatre Company. Buchholz's wife, Debby, was named managing director of the La Jolla Playhouse in 2018.

== Other ==
Buchholz was awarded the Allyn Young Teaching Prize by the Harvard University Department of Economics.

Buchholz invented the Math Arrow, a mathematical matrix that makes numbers more intuitive to children. He is the CEO of Sproglit, LLC, which develops software and classroom materials based on the Math Arrow.

== Economic Theories and Policy Proposals ==
- Law of Fertility, Prosperity, and Immigration
  In his book The Price of Prosperity, Buchholz says that when a nation's annual average GDP rate exceeds 2.5 percent for two consecutive 25-year periods (two generations), the fertility rate will drop to just over the replacement level, that is, 2.5 children per female. If GDP continues to grow for a third consecutive generation, the fertility rate will tend to drop below 2.1 children per female and the population will require immigration to maintain a stable working population. As a corollary, if the fertility rate falls below the replacement rate, the nation will find it extraordinarily difficult to pay down accumulated debt.
- On the editorial page of the Wall Street Journal in June 2012, Buchholz proposed the U.S. Treasury lock in record low borrowing rates by issuing 100-year bonds. With the 10-year Treasury yielding just 1.62%, Buchholz called it the "best deal since Pope Julius paid a pittance to have Michelangelo paint his ceiling." Fourteen months after the article appeared, yields had risen by 78 percent to 2.88%.
- In his book Rush, Buchholz argues from neuroscience and history that competitive societies achieve longer life expectancy, less disease, and greater measures of cooperation than societies that try to quash competitiveness.
- In 2011, on the front page of The Washington Post's Outlook section, Buchholz proposed turning unemployment compensation into signing bonuses. Instead of collecting 99 weeks of unemployment payments, under Buchholz's proposal, individuals would receive a signing bonus from the government if they accepted a job sooner.
- The Buchholz Hypothesis holds that crime is strongly correlated with interest rates.
- In his book New Ideas from Dead Economists, Buchholz argues that small countries with large social welfare programs may achieve strong GDP gains because they are able to free-ride on the gains generated by countries that promote a more competitive structure with less governmental intervention.
- In a 2019 essay reprinted in the South China Morning Post and a variety of global publications, Buchholz claimed that sluggish worldwide growth was actually benefitting the U.S. economy. He projected that slow GDP growth among U.S. trading partners was keeping interest rates remarkably low and inflation well-contained, which is more important for the U.S. economy than the loss of export growth. This is a rare situation, he stated, that confounds the standard textbook explanations.
- In a Washington Post essay in October 2026, Buchholz pointed out that massive data centers, built to support artificial intelligence, are subject to Moore's Law and likely to shrink over time. Buchholz suggested that communities not subsidize them.

== Economic Forecasting ==
- In a 2021 Wall Street Journal editorial, Buchholz warned of an inflation surge that would exceed the forecasts of the Federal Reserve Board and the White House. Buchholz argued that inflation was not just in the goods sector, but would climb sharply in the services sector, too.
- In January 2014, in an essay entitled "Green Acres Turning Red," Buchholz forecast a sharp decline in farmland prices, following a sharp multi-year rally. Buchholz stated that prices were "teetering on the slope of something ugly and parabolic." Over the next two years, farmland rental rates dropped by almost 20 percent.
- In April 2014, with the price of oil at approximately $100 per barrel, Buchholz appeared on Fox Business Channel with Maria Bartiromo and correctly forecast that the price of oil would plunge to $50 per barrel.
- In 2011, in keynote speeches and in television and radio interviews, Buchholz forecast that the Standard and Poor's (S&P) rating agency would downgrade U.S. Treasury debt. On August 5, S&P announced the downgrade of U.S. debt from AAA to AA+.
- In February 2009, Buchholz forecasted an economic recovery from the "Great Recession." In a speech to the Americas Lodging Investment Summit, Buchholz forecast that "we're going to have an economic recovery just in time for back-to-school sales in September" and that "lodging and hospitality is going to benefit from this upswing as well." GDP did turn positive in the third quarter of 2009.
- In April 2008, on the PBS Nightly Business Report, Buchholz forecast that commodity prices, including oil, would climb higher in the short-term but then tumble during the summer of 2008. On July 13, 2008, addressing the Southern Legislative Conference, when oil prices were $137 per barrel and leading Wall Street analysts were forecasting a move to $200, Buchholz predicted that prices would fall by half over the next six months. Over the following eight weeks, prices of commodities such as oil, grain, and industrial metals started to crumble, and the price of oil fell significantly.
- In an opening keynote speech at Everything Channel's 2008 VARBusiness 300 Conference in June 2008, Buchholz said he believed that the U.S. economy, while undoubtedly in a slowdown, would avoid two consecutive quarters of negative GDP, the classic definition of a recession. "I'm convinced we're not going to have any quarters of negative GDP", he added. Buchholz cited high employment, lean inventories at manufacturers, and strong exports, spurred by the weaker dollar, as reasons for his beliefs.
- In Buchholz's 2007 book New Ideas from Dead CEOs, published shortfly before the commercial launch of the Airbus A380, Buchholz criticized the project for inadequate testing of the engineering, commercial, and financial viability: "Airbus gathered orders for the behemoth A380 before the company knew how to build it." In 2019, faced with inadequate orders and unsustainable operational costs, Airbus announced that it would cease production.
- Buchholz's 1999 book Market Shock warned that the Eurozone was unstable and headed toward political turmoil.

== Links ==
- Roberts, Russ (June 13, 2011). "Buchholz on Competition, Stress, and the Rat Race". EconTalk. Library of Economics and Liberty.
- The Price of Prosperity: Why Rich Nations Fail and How to Renew Them
- G7 Group consulting firm
