= John Papola =

American film producer

- Education: Penn State University (BA)
- Occupation(s): Director, Producer, CEO
- Years active: 1999–present

John Papola (/pəˈpoʊlə/) is the co-founder, CEO, and creative director of Emergent Order, a creative studio based in the Austin, Texas, area. He is an American video producer and director who has worked for Spike TV, Nickelodeon, and MTV as well as for creative ad agencies such as Crispin Porter, Razorfish and JWT.

== Early life and education ==
Born into an Italian family in Philadelphia, Papola attended Penn State University from 1995 to 1999, receiving a BA in Cinematography and Film/Video Production.

== Career ==
Papola was a director and designer in MTV's Animation Series Development from 1999 to 2001. He started at MTV as a production assistant in the commercials division, then became an animator until finally a show developer and director of series pilots. At MTV he directed the animated series pilot The Mall Show.

He was a director and producer at Nickelodeon from 2001 to 2003. He directed, produced and edited show promotions, commercials and longer-form industry projects. These include the Jimmy Neutron product campaign, the Nickelodeon 2003 Upfront and The Kid’s Bill of Rights pro-social campaign. He also co-created, co-wrote and directed Robo Ralph, a story-driven interstitial series.

Papola worked as senior director and producer at Nicktoons Network from 2003 to 2004. In this position he helped develop the re-launch of the network's on-air branding and directed and edited the Cyber-ID campaign which he co-developed and co-produced with Jeremy Fernsler.

== Spike TV ==
Papola was creative director of Spike TV from June 2004 to April 2011. In this position, he oversaw promotional campaigns and special projects. His Look Closer cross-media campaign for the 2010 Video Game Awards went viral, as did his Back to the Future campaign for the Scream Awards, featuring Michael J. Fox. The latter was featured on Entertainment Tonight and was viewed more than 2.5 million times over the course of 3 days.

At Spike TV, he ran advertising campaigns for Unilever’s Axe, Burger King, Geico, Campbells, T-Mobile, Boston Beer, Snickers, Jeep and many more clients. He also conceived of the pro-social initiative True Dads in Uniform, an effort in partnership with the USO to maintain connections between U.S. troops overseas and their families back home.

Papola produced and directed The World Cyber Games series of long-form documentary specials about the world of competitive professional video gaming.

At IMDb.com, he is listed as being on the “creative group” behind the 2010 Spike TV VGA Video Game Awards, the 2010 Scream Awards, and the 2009 Spike TV VGA Video Game Awards. He is also listed as director and producer of two episodes of the 2007 TV series Game Head: “World Cyber Games: Grand Final” and “World Cyber Games USA National Final.” He is also named as editorial department member on the episode “World Cyber Games: Grand Final” and as editor and camera operator of the episode “World Cyber Games USA National Final.”

== Emergent Order ==
Papola is a co-founder of Emergent Order, a “content development, production and post-production company” that specializes in “short-format creative storytelling and brand creative from commercials to music videos to digital shorts destined for screens large and small.” It seeks “to work with great brands, develop original content and tell stories about the amazing, emerging world around us.” Papola is president and creative director with Michele Roi as executive producer, Joshua Meyers as vice president, and Lisa Versaci as a producer. Papola, Meyers, and Versaci are all co-founders of the firm.

Papola, a longtime resident of the greater New York City region, moved in 2011 from Vernon, N.J, to the Austin, Texas, area, where he established the headquarters of Emergent Order. He has served as the president and creative director of Emergent Order since April 2011.

Papola has described Emergent Order as “a visual content development and production company focused on bringing complex and important ideas to life in entertaining, playful, and irreverent ways.” The company was “launched...essentially on the viral success/impact” of the rap videos that he and Russell D. Roberts, a professor of economics at George Mason University, had made about the differences between the economic theories of John Maynard Keynes and Friedrich A. Hayek. Papola explained the success of those videos by saying that he and Roberts “seemed to be the first people to bring classical liberal ideas to life in a way that was entertaining, scholarly, and uncompromising while remaining even-handed.” The viral success of the videos, Papola has said, “seemed like an entrepreneurial opportunity that had to be pursued.”

His view is that in a highly partisan society, “there is a need for playful and thoughtful content that tackle[s] important subjects. Emergent Order exists to fill that void and to be a global leader in idea-driven content creation.”

== Works produced ==
=== EconStories ===
Papola and Roberts teamed up to create EconStories, which distributes the economics videos that Emergent Order develops, with the goal of bringing creativity and storytelling to economic education.

=== Fear the Boom and Bust ===
Together Papola and Roberts made a hip-hop music video about the economy, “Fear the Boom and Bust.” The video was released on YouTube on January 25, 2010, after debuting on a late 2009 episode of the PBS Newshour that featured a debate on economics in which Papola and Roberts took on Keynes biographer Robert Skidelsky. Although the video “tilts toward Hayek,” Skidelsky himself described the Keynes portion of the video as “Absolutely fair and brilliantly rhymed. It's not a complete account of Keynes but it seems to be completely right.” The video was translated into over a dozen languages, and was praised by PBS, NPR, CNBC, the Chicago Tribune and the New York Times. Paul Solman has written that when PBS News House announced plans to debut the Keynes vs. Hayek video rap, “it was anticipated with derision.” Yet, as Solman notes, the video rap “may well have become one of the most popular lessons in the history of macroeconomics.” As of July, 2013, it had over 4.3 million YouTube hits.

=== Fight of the Century ===
“Fight of the Century: Keynes vs. Hayek Round 2” is another hip-hop video by Papola and Roberts about the economy. Released in 2011, it examines the impact of government spending on the economy and addresses the question of whether the stimulus package would work. In a May 20, 2011, interview on C-SPAN, Papola and Roberts talked with Brian Lamb for an hour about “Fight of the Century.” In a 2011 interview with Papolo, Jeffrey Tucker called the rap videos “amazing” and “innovative. As of July, 2013, it had over 2.3 million hits on You Tube.

=== Deck the Halls with Macro Follies ===
In late 2012, PBS NewsHour showed Papola's economics video, “Deck the Halls with the Macro Follies.” Afterwards the PBS website ran a piece by Papola, "Consuming Our Way to Prosperity Is Macro Folly,” and a response by economist James Livingston, "The Nonsense of Austerity." The video has received over 182,000 YouTube hits. Another economics video by Papola and Roberts, “Hayek's Gift,” has received more than 154,000 hits.

=== At The Fork ===
Papola directed the feature film At The Fork which released in 2016. The film was done in collaboration with Whole Foods. The film is described as follows: "Filmmaker and omnivore John Papola, together with his vegetarian wife Lisa, offer up a timely and refreshingly unbiased look at how farm animals are raised for our consumption. With unprecedented access to large-scale conventional farms, Papola asks the tough questions behind every hamburger, glass of milk and baby-back rib. What he discovers are not heartless industrialists, but America's farmers - real people who, along with him, are grappling with the moral dimensions of farming animals for food."

== Political and economic views ==
Papola is a libertarian and an admirer of Hayek and Austrian economics. Asked when he had become a libertarian, he said that in 2006, when he had a long daily commute into New York City, he “started listening to audio books,” first US history, then such books as John Stossel’s Give Me a Break, which “started to open my eyes to a different approach to politics, one that was neither 'left' nor 'right.'” Then he ran into interviews with Russ Roberts on EconTalk, which he called “basically the greatest collection of economic discourse ever produced in history.” When he decided to put his media skills to work explaining “the 'Austrian' perspective,” he phoned Roberts to suggest a collaboration.

He has described himself as “a filmmaker and entrepreneur with a passion for economics” who “finds inquiring into how nations become wealthy absolutely exhilarating.” He admires the insights of John Stuart Mill, David Hume, and Adam Smith, which he feels “have largely been lost today,” when the “economic mainstream” is “disconnected from reality,” making this “a dark age of economic understanding.” It was Henry Hazlitt's book Economics in One Lesson that introduced Papola to Hayek and the Austrian school.

In a December 2012 essay written in connection with the video “Deck the Halls with Macro Follies,” Papola took on the idea, “first popularly asserted by Thomas Malthus,” and later resurrected by Keynes, that “savings, the opposite of consumption, is bad for growth.” He noted that “Adam Smith, Jean-Baptiste Say and Friedrich Hayek viewed savings as the vital lifeblood of economic growth,” for “savings aren’t simply taken out of the economic system, but become the source of capital that entrepreneurs use to create new goods and increase productivity,” and it is the latter that “is the key to a wealthier world.”

Papola has called Keynes “our modern Macro Santa,” for “today’s Keynesian economists believe that when we’re in an economic rut, government spending transforms into a magical debt-financed multiplier sack, able to create a limitless bounty of goodies.”

== Honors and awards ==
Papola won the Gold Promax Award for his "True Dads" Pro-social campaign; the Silver Broadcast Design Award for Art Direction and Design of "Nicktoons Scribblesonic ID"; and the Gold Broadcast Design Award for the "Jimmy Neutron Rocket Race" integrated promotion.

He also won the Gold Promax and Broadcast Design Awards for the Jimmy Neutron “Gotta Blast” campaign, which he wrote, produced, edited and directed. He has also been awarded a Silver Broadcast Design Award in the highly competitive “Image Promotion” category for a series of live-action/CGI spots entitled the “Cyber IDs” for the Nicktoons Network re-launch.

At the 3rd annual Sammies Awards in 2010, which are sponsored by the Sam Adams Alliance and recognize “exceptional citizen leaders working for a freer society,” Papola and Russ Roberts won the $3,000 Video Award for their video “Fear the Boom and Bust.”

== Personal life ==
Papola's wife is Lisa Versaci, who is also a co-founder of Emergent Order.
