= Cunning (surname) =

Cunning is a surname. Notable people with this surname include:

- Bobby Cunning (1930–1983), Scottish football player
- Cam Cunning (born 1985), Canadian ice hockey player
- Conal Cunning (born 1998), Irish hurler
- Hugh Cunning (1824–1892), American lawyer and politician in Wisconsin
- Kat Cunning (born 1992), American actress and musician
- Len Cunning (1950–2020), Canadian ice hockey player
- Mike Cunning (born 1958), American professional golfer

== See also ==
- Cunning (disambiguation)
