= Adam Smith's Moral Philosophy: A Historical and Contemporary Perspective on Markets, Law, Ethics, and Culture =

2005 book by Jerry Evensky

- Cover
- Author: Jerry Evensky
- Language: English
- Series: Historical Perspectives on Modern Economics
- Genre: History of economic thought, moral philosophy
- Publisher: Cambridge University Press
- Publication date: 2005
- Pages: 331
- ISBN: 978-0-521-85247-0 (hardback)
- OCLC: 60776894

Adam Smith's Moral Philosophy: A Historical and Contemporary Perspective on Markets, Law, Ethics, and Culture is a book by American economist Jerry Evensky. The book was published in 2005 by Cambridge University Press as part of the Historical Perspectives on Modern Economics series. The book presents Adam Smith not as an economist but as a moral philosopher, treating his major works, including The Theory of Moral Sentiments and The Wealth of Nations, as elements of a single, integrated intellectual vision rather than separate or conflicting projects. Evensky reconstructs what he identifies as Smith's central concern: how a liberal society can hold together and progress toward an ideal of "equality, liberty and justice" through the co-evolution of individuals and their social, political, and economic institutions. The final chapters bring Smith's framework into dialogue with modern economics, engaging the work of Gary Becker, Amartya Sen, Douglass North, and James Buchanan to argue that contemporary economic analysis would benefit from recovering the broader moral philosophical context in which Smith originally wrote.

== Summary ==
Evensky argues that Adam Smith was not an economist in any modern sense but a moral philosopher whose various writings form a single, coherent intellectual vision. Evensky contends that the so-called "Adam Smith Problem" (the supposed tension between the sympathy-centered Theory of Moral Sentiments and the self-interest-driven Wealth of Nations) dissolves once both works are understood as components of a unified project: imagining how a liberal society grounded in "equality, liberty and justice" might evolve and sustain itself.

The author reconstructs what he calls Smith's "vision," rooted in the posthumously published essay on the history of astronomy. Smith, like Newton, sought to identify invisible connecting principles behind observable phenomena, but his domain was the human world rather than the natural one. He emphasizes that for Smith, the invisible hand is not a metaphor for market equilibrium but the hand of a deity whose benevolent design guides humankind's progress—a progress that is real but never guaranteed, always subject to distortion by human frailty. Smith's faith in a designer deity is treated not as a rhetorical convenience but as a genuine source of his optimism, even though Evensky acknowledges that the logical structure of Smith's moral philosophy does not strictly require it.

From this philosophical foundation, Evensky traces Smith's account of human nature and ethical development. Individuals are born into societies that shape them through sympathy, socialization, and the desire for approbation, but each person's unique biography and capacity for imagination allow for autonomous moral judgment through an internalized "impartial spectator." Ethics thus co-evolve with social institutions across generations, and what any society considers its natural moral order is in fact the product of custom, circumstance, and historical accident. Evensky frames this as "moral relativism and invisible absolutes"—norms are always relative to time and place, yet an ideal standard exists as an unreachable limit toward which humanity can progress.

In the middle portion of the book, Evensky walks methodically through all five books of The Wealth of Nations, treating each not as standalone economic theory but as a chapter in Smith's larger moral philosophical narrative. The division of labor, capital accumulation, the circuits through which capital flows from agriculture to manufacturing to international trade, the natural and distorted paths of economic development—all are presented as dimensions of a simultaneous system in which social, political, and economic institutions must evolve in harmony. Evensky focuses on Smith's account of how feudal Europe's progress inverted the natural order, with towns advancing before the countryside, driven not by human reason but by the unintended consequences of lords' vanity and kings' political calculations.

The analysis sharpens considerably when Evensky turns to Smith's attack on the mercantile system. He traces how Smith's voice evolved from scholarly disagreement to genuine anger as Smith came to appreciate, especially after moving to London in 1773 and later serving as Commissioner of Customs, the degree to which mercantile interests had captured parliamentary policy for private gain. Evensky argues that Smith's 1790 revisions to The Theory of Moral Sentiments (especially the new Part VI on the character of virtue) represent a civic humanist appeal to statesmen to resist factional pressure, motivated by the same concern about mercantile power that animated the later editions of The Wealth of Nations.

In the final section, Evensky brings Smith into dialogue with modern economics. He contrasts "Chicago Smith" (the patron saint of homo economicus and laissez-faire) with "Kirkaldy Smith," the moral philosopher who understood that markets require ethical foundations, that institutions shape preferences, and that no single dimension of human motivation explains social order. He engages the work of Gary Becker, Amartya Sen, and James Buchanan to argue that Becker's utility-maximizing altruism cannot solve the cohesion problem of liberal society, while Sen's and Buchanan's richer frameworks approach Smith's own vision of a three-dimensional, co-evolving system of economic, political, and social institutions. Using Smith, Mill, Keynes, and Buchanan, Evensky traces the "quandary of capital": the tendency of accumulation to concentrate control and corrupt politics. He argues that both commutative and distributive justice are necessary for a liberal order to endure.

== Reviews ==
Richard Swedberg considered the book successful in recovering Smith as a moral philosopher rather than an economist. For Swedberg, Evensky's use of lengthy quotations from Smith "makes Adam Smith as a moral philosopher come alive and blocks the current view of him as an economist." He appreciated that the work bypasses the Adam Smith Problem by treating all of Smith's writings as expressions of a single vision, though he observed that Evensky, like many economists, largely ignored sociological literature on institutions despite gesturing toward interdisciplinary engagement. The book, argued Swedberg, transports the reader "from the universe of today's rather flat social science to the still-enchanted universe of the Scottish Enlightenment."

In her review, Maria Pia Paganelli compared Evensky to Newton and his book to a gravitational system that finally brings coherence to the scattered body of Smith's writings and the secondary literature surrounding them. She argued that Evensky identified the central organizing question of Smith's entire corpus: what cohesive force can hold society together so that its potential can be realized. For Paganelli, the book succeeded in showing that ignoring any dimension of human nature or the co-dependence of individuals and society "is an enterprise that may lead to partial and deformed results," and she stated that the book "deserves the admiration of Smith's scholars and should be read by all."

British economist Keith Tribe described the book as presenting Smith the moral philosopher in a "compelling and accessible manner." It was obvious to Tribe that Evensky framed Smith's moral philosophy as the social counterpart to Newton's natural philosophy. He found that roughly two-thirds of the text functions as a single continuous argument and praised the establishment of "an intelligible framework upon which much else can be built." Tribe also noticed that the direct exposition of the Theory of Moral Sentiments receives less attention than might be expected, with the moral philosophy instead constructed largely from the Lectures on Jurisprudence, and that the treatment of Book III of The Wealth of Nations devotes nearly all its pages to the mercantile system with only passing mention of the Physiocrats.

Jonathan B. Wight, from the University of Richmond, noted that Evensky built "a strong case for allowing Smith's faith and optimism to derive from" a belief in a benevolent deity, while acknowledging that Evensky himself conceded the logic of Smith's system does not strictly require one. Wight considered the work an ambitious and worthy undertaking that distills the essence of Smith's ethical model and applies it to markets, laws, and culture. He found the final section on modern economics the most accessible for general readers, especially the argument that Gary Becker's utility maximization framework cannot resolve the question of social cohesion. Wight believed that while the book occasionally investigates more deeply than necessary into certain subjects, "newcomers as well as authorities on Smith will find Evensky's treatment of the subject always fresh, accessible, and nuanced."

John F. Henry, from the Levy Economics Institute, called the work "intriguing, thoughtful, and thought-provoking, though not always compelling." Henry suggested that readers should pair the book with Samuel Fleischacker's and James Alvey's recent studies of Smith for a fuller picture. He found Evensky's demonstration that Smith's optimistic prospects for capitalism were contingent on a well-ordered society to be convincing, though he felt Evensky should have gone further into Smith's reservations about capitalism's future. Henry noted with some surprise Evensky's extended treatment of James Buchanan's work in the final chapters but acknowledged the logic of the connection, and he thought that readers of the Journal of Economic Issues "will find much that is favorably disposed to the institutionalist perspective and much to critique."
