= Math Arrow =

Karim Sardard

The Math Arrow matrix is a visual tool, designed to make the relationship among numbers more intuitive and to enhance the learning of mathematical functions. It was created by economist and author Todd Buchholz, a former White House economic adviser and winner of the Allyn Young Teaching Prize at Harvard University.

== Unique characteristics ==
Unlike a number line, which extends horizontally and infinitely, the Math Arrow displays the whole numbers from 0 to 100 in a pair of parallel zigzag lines. The numbers on the left-hand zigzag run from 0 at the bottom to 50 at the top; on the right-hand zigzag they run from 50 at the top to 100 at the bottom (the number 50 appears twice, at the top of both zigzags). The Math Arrow has several characteristics that allow users to detect patterns in the relationship of numbers.

1 Each pair of numbers on the same horizontal level sums to 100. 2 On the left half of the Math Arrow, each number is vertically above or below another number that sums to 50. 3 On the right half of the Math Arrow, each number is vertically above or below another number that sums to 150. 4 The zigzag pattern changes direction at each multiple of 5, except for 5, 45, 55, and 95. 5 Odd numbers are displayed in triangles, except for the odd multiple of 5, which is displayed in pentagons. 6 Even numbers are displayed in squares, except for multiples of 10, which are displayed in circles.

The tool is supported by an iPad app that is aimed at 3 to 13-year-olds. There are three difficulty levels to span those ages.

== Inventor ==
The Math Arrow was invented by economist and author Todd Buchholz, a former White House economic adviser and winner of the Allyn Young Teaching Prize at Harvard University. Buchholz developed and patented the Math Arrow in conjunction with his daughters Victoria, Katherine, and Alexia. The Math Arrow is used in games developed by the educational software company, Sproglit, LLC, of which Buchholz is a co-founder and chief executive officer.

In an article for the Huffington Post, Buchholz wrote: "Sometimes we need to fundamentally re-examine even the basic tools of the classroom. Take the number line, which hangs on the walls of kindergartens across the world. Why is it horizontal? Are we sure that this linear image is the most effective way to demonstrate relations among numbers? What if it had a different shape, for example, a zig-zag? Innovations in design can help develop math sense in our children and teach them in a way that engages and plays to their love of images."

== Reception ==
In 2013, several schools in San Diego and Utah began using Sproglit’s first game, Kyle Counts, as an iPad App in beta form.

The Math Arrow has been called "ingenious" by Martin Cooper, inventor of the cellular phone. It has also been praised by Caltech physicist Len Mlodinow, who co-wrote with Stephen Hawking, A Briefer History of Time and The Grand Design.

Commenting on the invention, The Guardian's Alex Bellos wrote: "The point behind Todd's reinvented number line is a valid and interesting one: that visual memory needs to be exploited far more than it currently is when we learn numbers. [...] Professional mathematicians will often tell you that the only way they can fully understand certain abstract concepts is by creating a visual image. So why not encourage children to do the same with numbers?"

Education Today highlighted the fact that Math Arrow is not the only product of its kind on the market but said, "Unlike other maths apps, it does not rely on drilling facts in a way that soon bores young children."
