= Fear the Boom and Bust =

- Produced by: John Papola
- Cinematography: Billy Scafuri, Adam Lustick
- Release date: January 23, 2010
- Running time: 7:33

Fear the Boom and Bust is a 2010 hip hop music video in which 20th century economists John Maynard Keynes and Friedrich von Hayek (played by Billy Scafuri and Adam Lustick, respectively) take part in a rap battle discussing economics, specifically, the boom and bust business cycle, for which the video is named. The video has more than 8.6 million views on YouTube.

== Overview ==
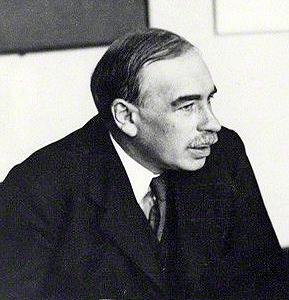
John Maynard Keynes

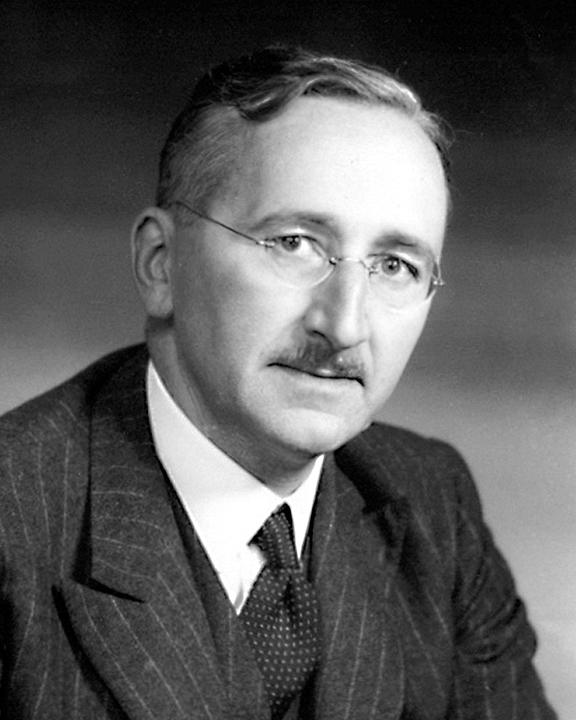
Friedrich von Hayek

The video was created by former Spike TV creative director and co-founder of the production company Emergent Order, John Papola, and economist Russ Roberts of the George Mason University Mercatus Center. Billy Scafuri and Adam Lustick, who are comedians with the Harvard Sailing Team and Upright Citizens Brigade, play Keynes and Hayek respectively.

== Sequel ==
In April 2011, a follow-up music video called Fight of the Century: Keynes vs. Hayek Round Two was released. This video examines the two economists' responses to the Great Recession. The central question in the video is whether a successful economy results from a "more bottom up" (i.e. totally free market) or "more top down" (i.e. Economic interventionism) approach.

== See also ==
- Animal Spirits: How Human Psychology Drives the Economy, and Why It Matters for Global Capitalism, a 2009 book by George A. Akerlof and Robert J. Shiller, where they discuss the "animal spirits" term by Keynes, which was featured in the video.
