= New Ideas from Dead Economists =

Book by Todd G. Buchholz

- Author: Todd G. Buchholz
- Language: English
- Genre: Non-fiction
- Publication date: 1989
- Publication place: United States

New Ideas from Dead Economists, written by Todd G. Buchholz, is an introduction to the history and development of modern economic thought, originally published in 1989. Since its original publication, there have been two revisions, the most recent of which was published in 2021. In the foreword, Martin Feldstein writes:

In this book, Todd Buchholz provides a intelligible introduction to the key ideas of economics through the study of the great economists who have shaped the discipline. Instead of the formal models and complex diagrams that are the focus of standard economics textbooks, Buchholz provides clear, nontechnical explanations and timely examples.

== Chapter headings ==
1. Introduction: The Plight of the Economist
2. The Second Coming of Adam Smith
3. Malthus: Prophet of Doom and Population Boom
4. David Ricardo and the Cry for Free Trade
5. The Stormy Mind of John Stuart Mill
6. The Angry Oracle Called Karl Marx
7. Alfred Marshall and the Marginalist Mind
8. Old and New Institutionalists
9. Keynes: Bon Vivant as Savior
10. The Monetarist Battle Against Keynes
11. The Public Choice School: Politics as a Business
12. The Wild World of Rational Expectations
13. Dark Clouds, Silver Linings
