= Shalem College =

Liberal arts college in Jerusalem, Israel

Coordinates: 31°45′7.1″N 35°13′41.01″E

- המרכז האקדמי שלם
- Type: Private; Liberal arts
- Established: 2013
- Chairman: David Messer
- President: Russ Roberts
- Dean: Leon Kass
- Location: Jerusalem, Israel
- Campus: Urban
- Website: www.shalem.ac.il

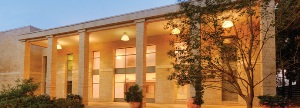
Shalem College building

Shalem College (Hebrew: המרכז האקדמי שלם, HaMerkaz HaAkademi Shalem) is a private liberal arts college in Jerusalem, Israel, offering an undergraduate education with the aim of producing "broadly educated citizens for lives of influence and service." It is the only Israeli institution of higher education to offer a broad-based Core Curriculum as the basis for a first degree, as opposed to the general practice in Israeli universities and colleges of restricting a student's courses to a single department or field.

Candidates to the college are selected on the basis of intellectual capabilities and demonstrated commitment to public service, which are assessed by exams, written assignments, and interviews. Accepted applicants receive substantial financial aid packages. The college is accredited by the Council for Higher Education in Israel.

== Academics ==
Shalem College has pioneered the use of a mandatory Core Curriculum for all students alongside a choice of major concentrations. Its 'David and Judith Lobel Core Curriculum', the centerpiece of the college’s academic community, includes courses in philosophy, history, literature, the natural and social sciences, and the fine arts. It emphasizes the classic texts of both Judaism and Islam (the Hebrew Bible, the Talmud, and the Koran, among others) and courses on Zionism and the history of the wider Middle East - subjects the college deems essential to meaningful citizenship in a modern Jewish state and active participation in Israel’s diverse society. The college also encourages the reading of primary sources. Most courses in the Lobel Core are taught in seminars of no more than 25 students.

After their first year, students choose one of three majors: the Interdisciplinary Program in Philosophy and Jewish Thought (IPJ), the Program in Middle Eastern and Islamic Studies (MEIS), or the Program in Strategy, Diplomacy, and Security (SDS). An additional major, in economics and public policy, is planned for the coming years.

In the Middle Eastern and Islamic Studies program significant emphasis is placed on Arabic studies, including bi-weekly practical exercises with Arabic speakers and intensive summer programs. Arabic-speaking students are offered Persian language studies. In the Strategy, Diplomacy, and Security program, students also engage in simulations and war games, in which they are required to take on the roles of decision-makers.

The language of instruction at Shalem is Hebrew, although students are required to demonstrate a level of English proficiency as a condition of their admittance.

== Citizenship and Peoplehood ==
The college features a comprehensive citizenship curriculum, including an experiential course on the major challenges in Israeli society and the “Israel Story” event series, part of the Asper Center for Zionist Education at Shalem College. The series brings notable Israeli authors—including David Grossman, Meir Shalev, Eli Amir, and Micah Goodman—to campus to discuss texts that have shaped the nation’s narrative. The Shalem accelerator also encourages student initiatives for social change, several of which have become sustainable organizations and nonprofits organizations.

Through the Koret Jewish Peoplehood Project at Shalem College, students have participated in delegations to the Bay Area and the AIPAC policy conference in Washington DC.

Students at Shalem College are involved in a variety of community projects, including: the Shvil Yisrael Library, renovation of apartments for welfare families in the neighborhood, and more.

When it comes to professional development and integration into the job market, Shalem College provides students with comprehensive guidance and advice, which continues even after students have completed their degrees. This includes a personal mentoring program, integration into internships in a variety of organizations during their studies, both in Israel and abroad, professional training, an entrepreneurship accelerator, and more.

Graduates of Shalem college continue on to advanced degrees at universities in Israel and abroad, and are integrated into leadership positions in government ministries; non-profit organizations and social enterprises; in education, culture, and media; in high-tech; and in the business sector.

== Leadership and Faculty ==
The president of the Shalem College is the economist Prof. Russ Roberts, host of the popular podcast "EconTalk: Conversations for the Curious”, and author of “Wild Problems” and other books. His predecessor in the position was Prof. Isaiah Gafni, an expert on Jewish history in the Second Temple period and former Professor Emeritus and Head of the Saul Rosenblum Chair in the History of the People of Israel at the Hebrew University of Jerusalem. Upon the establishment of the institution, the position was held by Middle-East historian Dr. Martin Kramer, who served as president of the college from 2013 to 2017. The current Dean of the Faculty is Leon Kass.

== History ==
Shalem College was founded in January 2013 following accreditation by the Council for Higher Education in Israel. It grew out of The Shalem Center, a think tank that aimed to enrich Israel’s intellectual discourse through research, publications, and education.

Shalem College was home to notable Israeli public figures, including former Israeli Ambassador to the United States Michael Oren, who wrote his definitive history of the Six-Day War while a fellow there, and the human-rights activist and Israel Prize winner Natan Sharansky, who has taught a seminar at the college on democracy and national identity.

== Shalem College Press ==
Shalem College is also home to a publishing house that was established in 1995. Over the years, the goals of the press have expanded to include Hebrew translations of works in political, economic, and social thought. The first editor of the publishing house was Assaf Sagiv. Since 2022, historian Yigal Liverant has served as the editor-in-chief.

Shalem Press publishes a variety of translations and original works in Hebrew and English, and it is divided into three thematic "Libraries":

- Leviathan Library (named after Thomas Hobbes' famous work Leviathan): Hebrew translations of philosophical works from classical antiquity to the present, such as Democracy in America by Alexis de Tocqueville, The Prince by Niccolò Machiavelli, On Liberty by John Stuart Mill, Begriffsschrift by Gottlob Frege, The Road to Serfdom by Friedrich Hayek, After Virtue by Alasdair MacIntyre and more.
- Democratic Thought Library: Hebrew translations of books in the fields of political and social thought, such as Six Days of War by Michael Oren, The Case for Democracy by Natan Sharansky and Ron Dermer, The Construction of Nationhood by Adrian Hastings, Power and the Idealists by Paul Berman, and Diplomacy by Henry Kissinger.
- Jewish Thought Library: Books in the field of Jewish philosophy and thought, for example, the works of Eliezer Berkovits.

== See also ==
- List of universities and colleges in Israel
- Education in Israel
