= Russ Roberts =

American economist

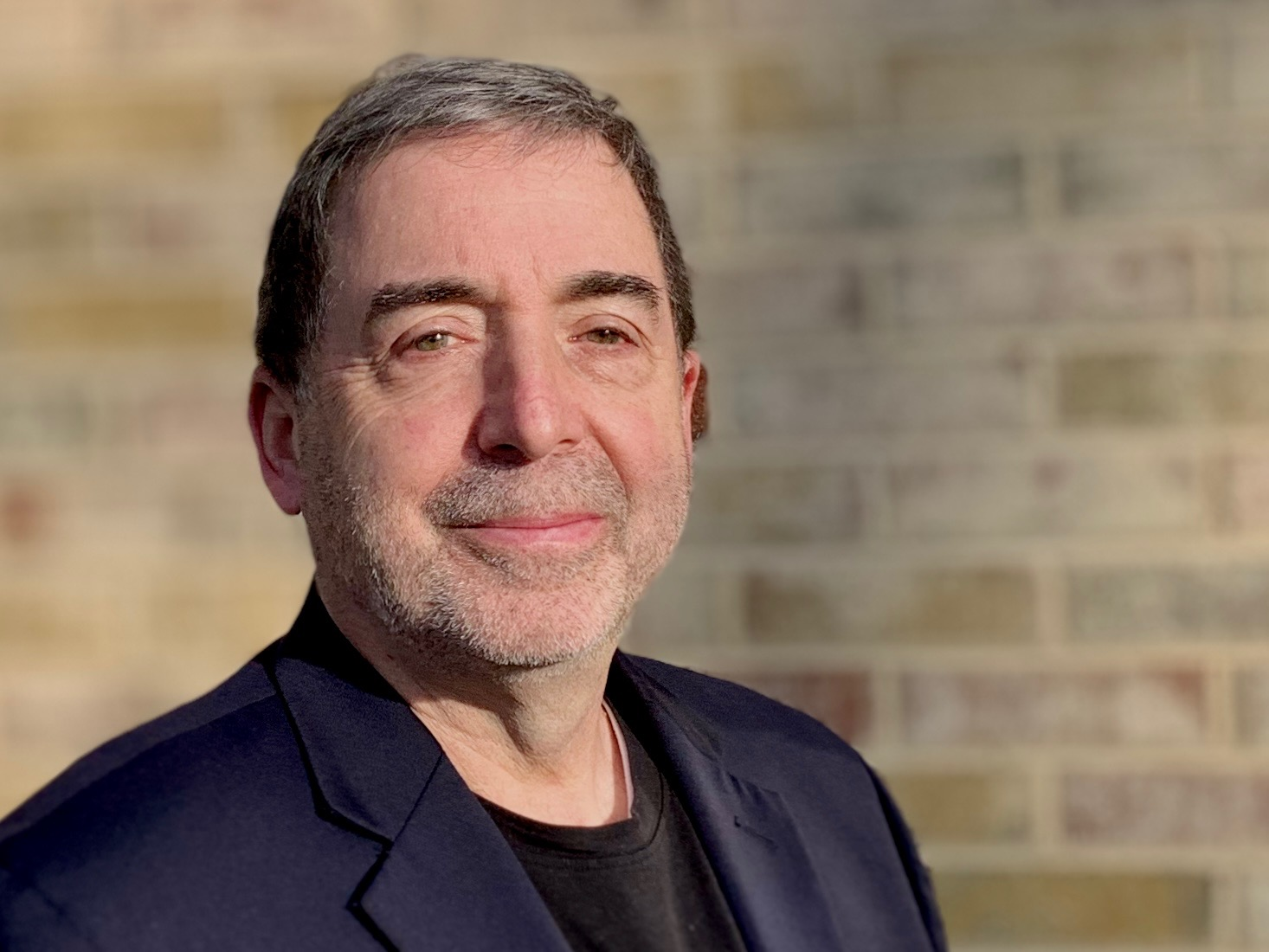
- Born: September 19, 1954 (age 72); Memphis, Tennessee, US

Academic background
- Education: University of North Carolina at Chapel Hill (BA); University of Chicago (PhD)
- Doctoral advisor: Gary Becker
- Influences: Friedrich Hayek; Milton Friedman; Adam Smith

Academic work
- Institutions: Shalem College
- Website: www.russroberts.info

Russell David Roberts (born September 19, 1954) is an American economist. He is a research fellow at Stanford University's Hoover Institution and president of Shalem College in Jerusalem. He is also the host of the EconTalk podcast.

== Biography ==
Roberts was born on September 19, 1954, in Memphis, Tennessee. He graduated from the University of North Carolina at Chapel Hill in 1975 with a Bachelor of Arts degree in economics. He then did doctoral studies in economics at the University of Chicago under the supervision of Gary Becker. He received a Ph.D. in 1981 with a dissertation on the design of government transfer programs.

== Academic career ==
Roberts has taught at George Mason University, Washington University in St. Louis (where he was the founding director of what is now the Center for Experiential Learning at the Olin Business School), the University of Rochester, Stanford University, and the University of California, Los Angeles. He is a regular commentator on business and economics for National Public Radio's Morning Edition, and has written for The New York Times and The Wall Street Journal.

Roberts was appointed the third president of Shalem College in November 2020, a position he assumed in March 2021. In explaining the college's selection of Roberts, chair of the executive committee of Shalem's International Board of Governors Yair Shamir pointed to Roberts's American educational background as a deciding factor, as well as his outspoken belief in the necessity of a true liberal arts education today.

== Social media ==
Roberts blogs at Cafe Hayek with Donald J. Boudreaux at George Mason University.

Roberts has hosted the weekly economics podcast EconTalk since March 2006. The podcast is hosted by the Library of Economics and Liberty, an online library sponsored by Liberty Fund. On the podcast, Roberts has interviewed more than a dozen Nobel Prize laureates including Nobel Prize in Economics recipients Daron Acemoglu, Ronald Coase, Milton Friedman, Abhijit Banerjee, Gary Becker, and Joseph Stiglitz as well as Nobel Prize in Physics recipient Robert Laughlin. He has also interviewed people such as Patrick Collison, Sam Altman, Marc Andreessen, Sam Harris and Nassim Nicholas Taleb.

== Published works ==
Robert's books illustrate economic concepts in unconventional ways. In 2001, he published the novel The Invisible Heart: An Economic Romance, which conveys economic ideas through conversations between two fictional teachers at an exclusive high school in Washington, D.C.: one is a market oriented economics instructor, and the other is an English teacher who wants governmental protections that curb the excesses of unrestrained capitalism.

In 2008, Roberts released another novel, The Price of Everything: A Parable of Possibility and Prosperity, which focuses on the experiences of Ramon Fernandez, a university student and star tennis player who, as a child, accompanied his mother to the U.S. after she fled from Fidel Castro's Cuba. Like The Invisible Heart, The Price of Everything uses conversations between its main characters to address economic concepts (in this case ideas such as the price system, spontaneous order and the possibility of price gouging in crisis situations).

In 2014, Roberts offered an uncommon perspective on Adam Smith in his book, How Adam Smith Can Change Your Life: An Unexpected Guide to Human Nature and Happiness. The book does not discuss Smith's well known 1776 work, The Wealth of Nations; it instead examines Smith's 1759 precursor to behavioral economics, The Theory of Moral Sentiments.

== Views and opinions ==
Roberts describes himself as a classical liberal, stating, "I believe in limited government combined with personal responsibility. So I am something of a libertarian, but ... that term comes with some baggage and some confusion." Roberts generally opposes Keynesian economics—particularly stimulus spending—saying that "it's very hard to argue in logical terms that spending money unwisely is the way to get wealthy." In October 2011 he initiated a lively, extended conversation with the Nobel laureate Paul Krugman over the effectiveness of Keynesian policies by declaring that "Krugman is a Keynesian because he wants bigger government. I'm an anti-Keynesian because I want smaller government." Krugman quoted this statement in his response and then said that "Keynesianism is not and never has been about promoting bigger government," and also that "you find conservative economists promoting quite Keynesian views of stabilization policy." In subsequent posts, the two economists disagreed on many things, but neither one contested one central idea: Krugman was content to be characterized as a Keynesian, while Roberts was not.

Roberts has urged those who formulate public policy and the economists who advise them to be more skeptical of the findings of empirical studies, and he views ultra-specific claims by politicians that their promoted policies will produce a certain number of jobs or a certain amount of growth as inherently unreliable.

== Publications ==
=== Books ===
- The Choice: A Fable of Free Trade and Protectionism (1st ed.). Prentice Hall. 1994. ISBN 978-0-13-083008-1. OCLC 29357777.
  - The Choice: A Fable of Free Trade and Protectionism (3rd ed.). Prentice Hall. 2006. ISBN 978-0-13-143354-0. OCLC 70839758.
  - The Choice: A Fable of Free Trade and Protectionism (CD audio). Princeton, NJ: Recording for the Blind & Dyslexic. 2002. OCLC 51110966.
- The Invisible Heart: An Economic Romance (1st ed.). MIT Press. 2002. ISBN 978-0-262-68135-3. OCLC 44413917.
- The Price of Everything: A Parable of Possibility and Prosperity (1st ed.). Princeton University Press. 2008. ISBN 978-0-691-14335-4. OCLC 231587398.
- Gambling with other people's money: how perverted incentives caused the financial crisis. Legatum Institute. 2010. ISBN 978-1-907409-06-6. OCLC 751698980.
- How Adam Smith Can Change Your Life: An Unexpected Guide to Human Nature and Happiness. Portfolio Hardcover. 2014. ISBN 978-1-59184-684-0. OCLC 881681030.
- Wild Problems: A Guide to the Decisions That Define Us. Portfolio Hardcover. 2022. ISBN 978-0-59341-825-3. OCLC 1321820629.

=== Articles and papers ===
- Roberts, Russ. "Working Papers in Economics": Domestic Studies Program (Hoover Institution on War, Revolution and Peace):
  - Roberts, Russ (1986). Financing public goods. no. E-86-9. OCLC 39865959.
    - Also published as: Roberts, Russ (April 1987). "Financing public goods". Journal of Political Economy. 95 (2): 420–437. doi:10.1086/261463. S2CID 154574265.
  - Roberts, Russ (1988). Subsidies to Private Spending on Public Goods. no. E-88-22. OCLC 22871627.
    - Also published as: Roberts, Russ (September 1992). "Government subsidies to private spending on public goods". Public Choice. 74 (2): 133–152. doi:10.1007/bf00140763. JSTOR 30025593. S2CID 154960626.
- Roberts, Russ (February 1984). "A positive model of private charity and public transfers". Journal of Political Economy. 92 (1): 136–148. doi:10.1086/261212. S2CID 154058725.
- Roberts, Russ (January 1985). "A taxonomy of public provision". Public Choice. 47 (1): 267–303. doi:10.1007/BF00119360. JSTOR 30024844. S2CID 154025814.
- Roberts, Russ (April 1985). "Recipient preferences and the design of government transfer programs". Journal of Law and Economics. 28 (1): 27–546. doi:10.1086/467074. S2CID 153715129.
- Roberts, Russ (June 1989). "Why comply: one-sided enforcement of price controls and victimless crime laws". Journal of Legal Studies. 18 (2): 403–414. doi:10.1086/468152. JSTOR 3085626. S2CID 154809833.
- Roberts, Russ; Lott, John R. (January 1991). "A guide to the pitfalls of identifying price discrimination". Economic Inquiry. 29 (1): 14–23. CiteSeerX 10.1.1.488.6285. doi:10.1111/j.1465-7295.1991.tb01249.x.
- Roberts, Russ (May 1992). "When does a decrease in a distortion increase welfare?". Economics Letters. 39 (1): 37–42. doi:10.1016/0165-1765(92)90098-J.

== See also ==
- Fear the Boom and Bust – a 2010 hip-hop music video with a mock debate between economists John Maynard Keynes and Friedrich Hayek
