= Bobby Cunning =

Scottish footballer

Personal information
- Full name: Robert Robertson Innes Cunning
- Date of birth: 12 February 1930
- Place of birth: Dunfermline, Scotland
- Date of death: 24 January 1983 (aged 52)
- Place of death: Dunoon, Scotland
- Position: Winger

Senior career*
Years	Team	Apps	(Gls)
1949–1950	Port Glasgow Athletic		
1950–1951	Sunderland	4	(0)
1951–1954	Hamilton Academical	58	(23)
1954–1955	Rangers	3	(0)
- * Club domestic league appearances and goals

Robert Robertson Innes Cunning (12 February 1930 – 24 January 1983) was a Scottish professional footballer who played as a winger for Sunderland, Hamilton Academical and Rangers.
