= Cunning =

Cunning may refer to:

- Cunning (comedy duo), a Japanese comedy duo
- Cunning folk, a type of folk magician
- Cunning (surname), a list of people with Cunning as a surname

== See also ==
- Cunningham (disambiguation)
