= EconTalk =

- Genre: Economics
- Language: English

Cast and voices
- Hosted by: Russ Roberts

Production
- Length: 1 hour

Technical specifications
- Audio format: mp3

Publication
- Original release: March 16, 2006 – present
- Updates: Mondays

Related
- Website: www.econtalk.org

EconTalk is a weekly economics podcast hosted by Russ Roberts. Roberts, formerly an economics professor at George Mason University, is a research fellow at Stanford University's Hoover Institution. Roberts typically interviews a single guest—often professional economists—on topics in economics. The podcast is hosted by the Library of Economics and Liberty, an online library sponsored by Liberty Fund.

Roberts has interviewed more than a dozen Nobel laureates, including Nobel Prize in Economics recipients Ronald Coase, Milton Friedman, Gary Becker, and Joseph Stiglitz as well as Nobel Prize in Physics recipient Robert Laughlin.

== History ==
The old EconTalk logo

The first EconTalk podcast was released in 2006. Roberts interviewed Milton Friedman on EconTalk just a few months before Friedman's death in November 2006. When Roberts was asked in 2015 to pick his most interesting episode, he mentioned two podcasts and included the Friedman interview he had conducted almost a decade earlier.

EconTalk was awarded second place in 2006 and 2007 in the Weblog Awards, followed by first place in 2008. By 2016, Roberts had recorded over 500 podcast episodes, and each week's new installment was downloaded by approximately 80,000 listeners.

In 2018, National Review columnist Mona Charen praised EconTalk for consistently "taking the ‘dismal’ out of the dismal science," saying that Roberts disagrees with guests as a "model of polite demurral."

== Themes ==
Roberts has described himself as "a pretty hardcore free marketer." In keeping with this general ideological orientation, major themes of the podcast series include Austrian economics (especially the theories of F.A. Hayek), Classical economics (in particular the ideas of Adam Smith), the way markets evolve, spontaneous order (which is often referred to as "emergence" or "emergent order"), and the division of labor. Guests often include authors of recently published books of current interest in economics. Topics of interest to guests as well as topics suggested by commenters and listeners sometimes become extended themes in subsequent podcasts. Additional themes include health economics, law and economics, public choice, as well as the economics of education and of sports.

Because the podcast series unabashedly favors a laissez-faire approach to economic regulation, some center-left news organizations view it with a certain wariness. However, the series' reputation for thoughtful analysis also creates genuine interest: a 2010 editorial in the left-leaning British newspaper The Guardian warned that EconTalk is "far too trusting of free markets," but concluded by saying, "at the end of an hour, the dismal science doesn't seem so bad after all, but a fun and useful set of tools to approach some of society's biggest questions."

=== Friedrich Hayek ===
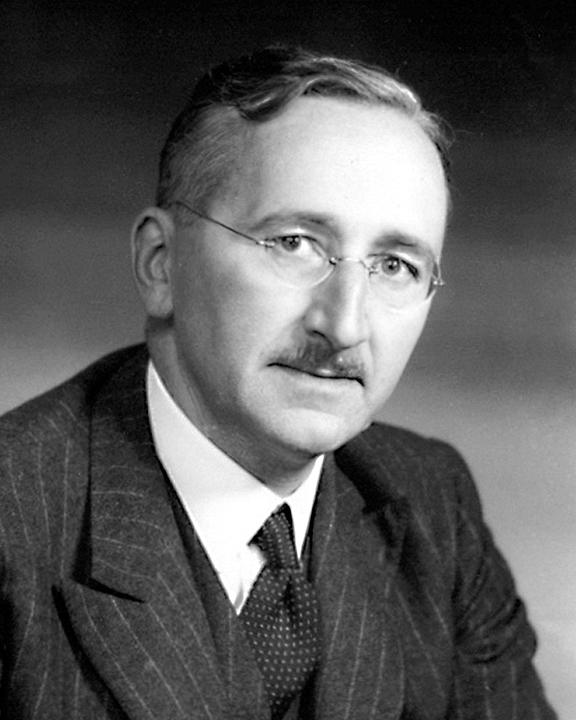
The ideas of the Austrian School economist F.A. Hayek are discussed regularly on EconTalk.

Roberts has a particular interest in spontaneous order and related theories from Friedrich August von Hayek which emphasize the role and nature of knowledge. This often finds form in how societies organize themselves in not just economic but in social and political spheres as well. A running question Roberts poses to guests in this vein is how we should set out to describe this critical idea, as normal conversation rarely captures the essence of the idea.

Roberts has commended the 1945 essay written by Hayek, "The Use of Knowledge in Society", as have a number of his guests. The essay explains that a free market with an uninhibited price mechanism at its core will make much more efficient use of information that is broadly dispersed among numerous members of society than will a centrally planned economy. In an EconTalk interview released on March 9, 2009, the co-founder of Wikipedia, Jimmy Wales, said that he read "The Use of Knowledge in Society" as an undergraduate and that it had a "deep impact" on his thinking. Later, his decision to structure the Wikipedia project as a collaborative encyclopedia that anyone could edit reflected the essay's point that decentralized knowledge is often superior to centralized, processed information. In essence, Wales decided that it was "better to push the decision making out to the endpoints - out to the people who actually have the information [rather than trying to] gather all of the world's information and have it sent in to a group of experts who then make editorial decisions."

=== Classical economics ===
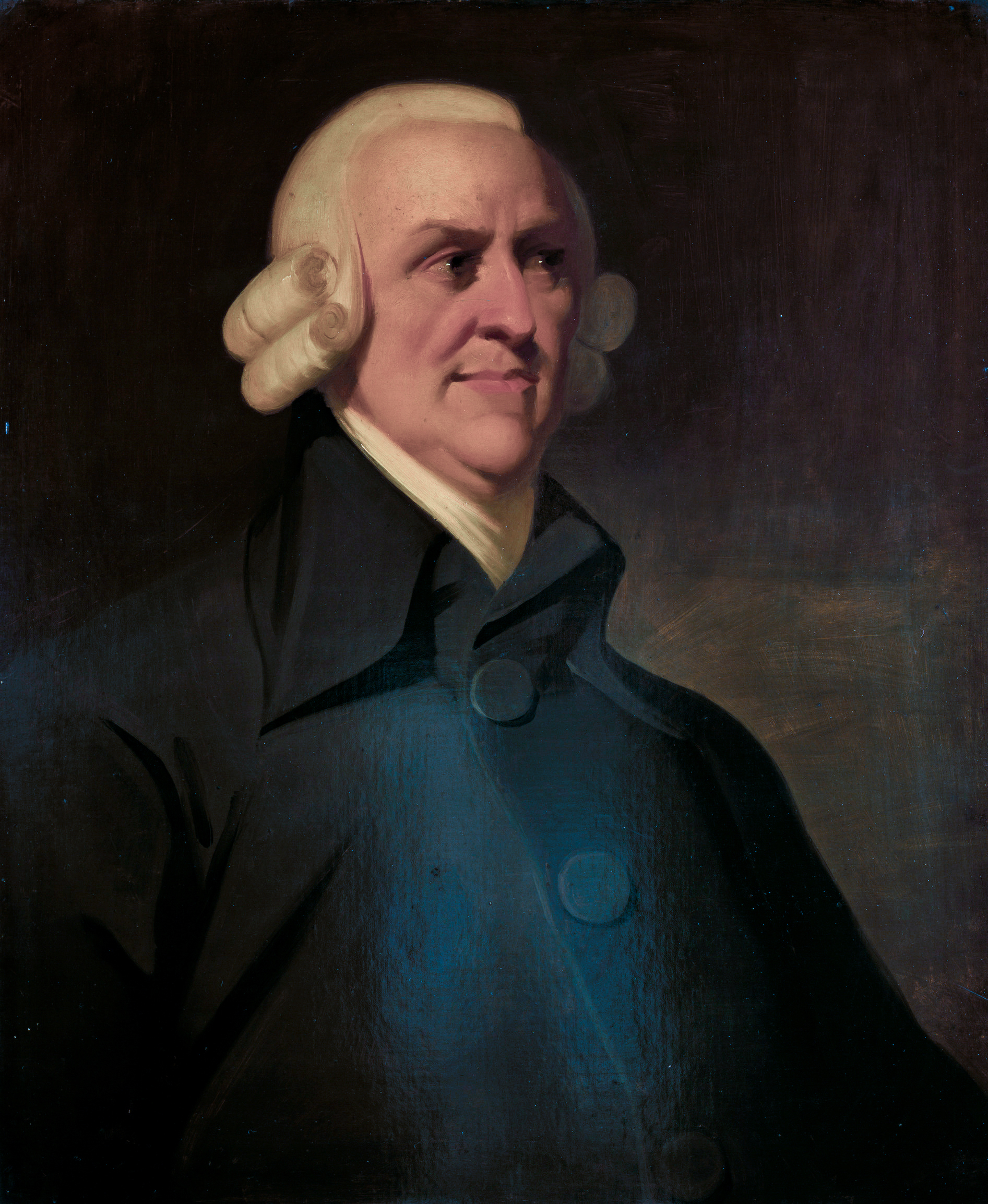
Probable portrait of Adam Smith, author of The Wealth of Nations and The Theory of Moral Sentiments

Concepts from Adam Smith's essential 1776 book The Wealth of Nations are mentioned frequently by Roberts and many of his guests. Smith's division of labor plays a recurring role in the podcasts, particularly in how it contributes to the creation of wealth. These increases in productivity are notably striking and often appear in conversations concerning trade, growth, and technology.

A surprisingly large number of podcast episodes are dedicated in their entirety to Smith's lesser-known book first published in 1759, The Theory of Moral Sentiments. After Roberts released his own book examining The Theory of Moral Sentiments entitled How Adam Smith Can Change Your Life: An Unexpected Guide to Human Nature and Happiness, he dedicated the October 13, 2014 episode of EconTalk to a conversation about his views on Smith's earlier book.

=== The future ===
Roberts sometimes asks his guests if they are optimistic about the future, particularly at the end of the interview. Guests occasionally speculate on what may evolve in the long run.

Many of the discussions on EconTalk regarding future developments do not center specifically on new technologies, but rather on the economic implications of new technologies. The podcast's conversations regarding driverless cars, for example, analyzed how autonomous cars might decrease employment of truck drivers, the potential for increased labor productivity as workers complete job tasks while being chauffeured to their workplaces, the possibility that driverless cars might be supplied through the sharing economy, and how carsharing of driverless cars could decrease individual car ownership (with a resulting decrease in real estate demand for commercial and residential parking areas).

== Guests ==
A few guests appear regularly on EconTalk to consider questions that arise in the press or in classrooms. Like Roberts himself, those guests making the most regular return appearances on the series are sympathetic to classical economic liberalism. Frequent guests include Mike Munger, an economist who teaches economics, political science, and public policy at Duke University, Don Boudreaux, an economics professor at George Mason University and a co-blogger with Roberts at Café Hayek, Arnold Kling, an economist and blogger who formerly worked for the Federal Reserve and Freddie Mac, and Richard Epstein, a lawyer who has written extensively in the field of law and economics.

Though Roberts is markedly frank about his own libertarian biases, EconTalk has been noted for hosting civil, cogent discussions between Roberts and others with whom he vigorously disagrees.

Roberts also hosts non-economists such as Patrick Collison, Sam Altman, Marc Andreessen and Nassim Nicholas Taleb.

== Influence ==
EconTalk has an impact beyond the United States, the country where it is produced, and beyond the countries which speak primarily English. Ideas from the podcast series are discussed in the United Kingdom, China, India, France, Australia, and elsewhere, influencing think tanks, international aid organizations, and entities interested in development economics.
