= The Theory of Moral Sentiments =

1759 book by Adam Smith

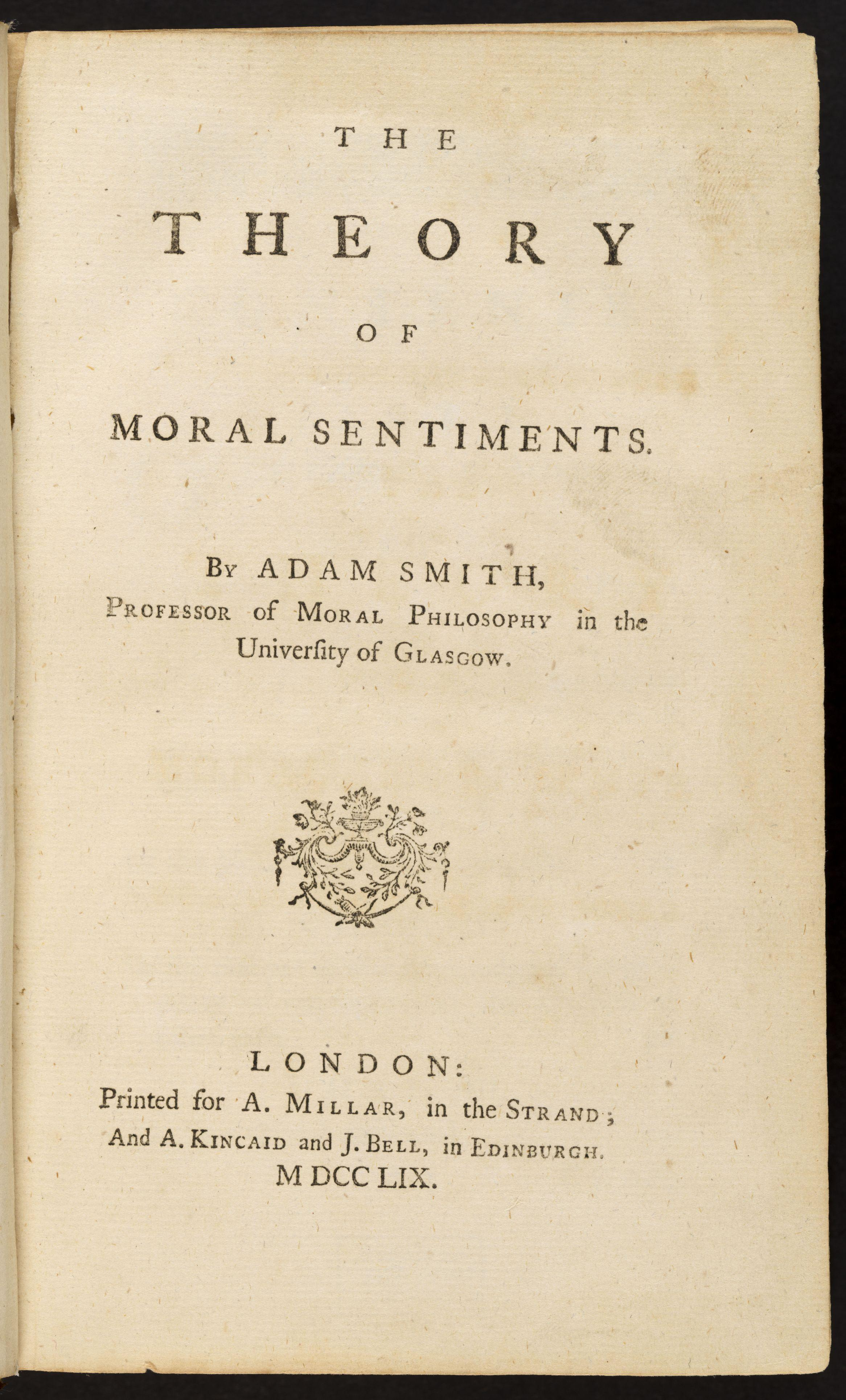
- Title page of first edition
- Author: Adam Smith
- Subjects: Human nature, Morality
- Publisher: printed for Andrew Millar, in the Strand; and Alexander Kincaid and J. Bell, in Edinburgh
- Publication date: on or before 12 April 1759
- Publication place: Scotland
- Text: The Theory of Moral Sentiments at Wikisource

The Theory of Moral Sentiments is a 1759 book by Adam Smith. It provided the ethical, philosophical, economic, and methodological underpinnings to Smith's later works, including The Wealth of Nations (1776), Essays on Philosophical Subjects (1795), and Lectures on Justice, Police, Revenue, and Arms (1763) (first published in 1896).

== Sympathy ==
Smith departed from the "moral sense" tradition of Anthony Ashley-Cooper, 3rd Earl of Shaftesbury, Francis Hutcheson, and David Hume, as the principle of sympathy takes the place of that organ. "Sympathy" was the term Smith used for the feeling of these moral sentiments. It was the feeling of understanding the passions of others. It operated through a logic of mirroring, in which a spectator imaginatively reconstructed the experience of the person he watches:

As we have no immediate experience of what other men feel, we can form no idea of the manner in which they are affected, but by conceiving what we ourselves should feel in the like situation. Though our brother is on the rack, as long as we ourselves are at our ease, our senses will never inform us of what he suffers. They never did, and never can, carry us beyond our own person, and it is by the imagination only that we can form any conception of what are his sensations. Neither can that faculty help us to this any other way, than by representing to us what would be our own, if we were in his case. It is the impressions of our own senses only, not those of his, which our imaginations copy. By the imagination, we place ourselves in his situation ...

However, Smith rejected the idea that Man was capable of forming moral judgements beyond a limited sphere of activity, again centered on his own self-interest:

The administration of the great system of the universe ... the care of the universal happiness of all rational and sensible beings, is the business of God and not of man. To man is allotted a much humbler department, but one much more suitable to the weakness of his powers, and to the narrowness of his comprehension: the care of his own happiness, of that of his family, his friends, his country.... But though we are ... endowed with a very strong desire of those ends, it has been entrusted to the slow and uncertain determinations of our reason to find out the proper means of bringing them about. Nature has directed us to the greater part of these by original and immediate instincts. Hunger, thirst, the passion which unites the two sexes, and the dread of pain, prompt us to apply those means for their own sakes, and without any consideration of their tendency to those beneficent ends which the great Director of nature intended to produce by them

The rich only select from the heap what is most precious and agreeable. They consume little more than the poor, and in spite of their natural selfishness and rapacity, though they mean only their own conveniency, though the sole end which they propose from the labours of all the thousands whom they employ, be the gratification of their own vain and insatiable desires, they divide with the poor the produce of all their improvements. They are led by an invisible hand to make nearly the same distribution of the necessaries of life, which would have been made, had the earth been divided into equal portions among all its inhabitants, and thus without intending it, without knowing it, advance the interest of the society, and afford means to the multiplication of the species.

In a published lecture, Vernon L. Smith further argued that Theory of Moral Sentiments and Wealth of Nations together encompassed:

"one behavioral axiom, 'the propensity to truck, barter, and exchange one thing for another,' where the objects of trade I will interpret to include not only goods, but also gifts, assistance, and favors out of sympathy ... whether it is goods or favors that are exchanged, they bestow gains from trade that humans seek relentlessly in all social transactions. Thus, Adam Smith's single axiom, broadly interpreted ... is sufficient to characterize a major portion of the human social and cultural enterprise. It explains why human nature appears to be simultaneously self-regarding and other-regarding."

== The Theory of Moral Sentiments: Edition 6 ==
Consists of 7 parts:

- Part I: Of the propriety of action
- Part II: Of merit and demerit; or of the objects of reward and punishment
- Part III: Of the foundations of our judgments concerning our own sentiments and conduct, and of the sense of duty.
- Part IV: Of the effect of utility upon the sentiments of approbation.
- Part V: Of the influence of custom and fashion upon the sentiments of moral approbation and disapprobation.
- Part VI: Of the character of virtue
- Part VII: Of systems of moral philosophy

=== Part I: Of the propriety of action ===
Part one of The Theory of Moral Sentiments consists of three sections:

- Section 1: Of the sense of propriety
- Section 2: Of the degrees of which different passions are consistent with propriety
- Section 3: Of the effects of prosperity and adversity upon the judgment of mankind with regard to the propriety of action; and why it is more easy to obtain their approbation in the one state than the other

==== Part I, Section I: Of the Sense of Propriety ====
Section 1 consists of 5 chapters:

- Chapter 1: Of sympathy
- Chapter 2: Of the pleasure of mutual sympathy
- Chapter 3: Of the manner in which we judge of the propriety or impropriety of the affections of other men by their concord or dissonance with our own
- Chapter 4: The same subject continued
- Chapter 5: Of the amiable and respectable virtues

===== Part I, Section I, Chapter I: Of Sympathy =====
According to Smith, people have a natural tendency to care about the well-being of others for no other reason than the pleasure one gets from seeing them happy. He calls this sympathy, defining it "our fellow-feeling with any passion whatsoever" (p. 5). He argues that this occurs under either of two conditions:

- We see firsthand the fortune or misfortune of another person
- The fortune or misfortune is vividly depicted to us

Although, this is apparently true, he follows to argue that this tendency lies even in "the greatest ruffian, the most hardened violator of the laws of society" (p. 2).

Smith also proposes several variables that can moderate the extent of sympathy, noting that the situation that is the cause of the passion is a large determinant of our response:

- The vividness of the account of the condition of another person

An important point put forth by Smith is that the degree to which we sympathize, or "tremble and shudder at the thought of what he feels", is proportional to the degree of vividness in our observation or the description of the event.

- Knowledge of the causes of the emotions

When observing the anger of another person, for example, we are unlikely to sympathize with this person because we "are unacquainted with his provocation" and as a result cannot imagine what it is like to feel what he feels. Further, since we can see the "fear and resentment" of those who are the targets of the person's anger we are likely to sympathize and take side with them. Thus, sympathetic responses are often conditional on—or the magnitude for understanding another person is determined by—the causes of the emotion the person is experiencing.

- Whether other people are involved in the emotion

Specifically, emotions such as joy and grief tell us about the "good or bad fortune" of the person we are observing them in, whereas anger tells us about the bad fortune with respect to another person. It is the difference between intrapersonal emotions, such as joy and grief, and interpersonal emotions, such as anger, that causes the difference in sympathy, according to Smith. That is, intrapersonal emotions trigger at least some sympathy without the need for context whereas interpersonal emotions are dependent on context.

He also proposes a natural "motor" response to seeing the actions of others: If we see a knife hacking off a person's leg we wince away, if we see someone dance we move in the same ways, we feel the injuries of others as if we had them ourselves.

Smith makes clear that we sympathize not only with the misery of others but also the joy; he states that observing an emotional state through the "looks and gestures" in another person is enough to initiate that emotional state in ourselves. Furthermore, we are generally insensitive to the real situation of the other person; we are instead sensitive to how we would feel ourselves if we were in the situation of the other person. For example, a mother with a suffering baby feels "the most complete image of misery and distress" while the child merely feels "the uneasiness of the present instant" (p. 8).

===== Part I, Section I, Chapter II: Of Pleasure and mutual sympathy =====
Smith continues by arguing that people feel pleasure from the presence of others with the same emotions as one's self, and displeasure in the presence of those with "contrary" emotions. Smith argues that this pleasure is not the result of self-interest: that others are more likely to assist oneself if they are in a similar emotional state. Smith also makes the case that pleasure from mutual sympathy is not derived merely from a heightening of the original felt emotion amplified by the other person. Smith further notes that people get more pleasure from the mutual sympathy of negative emotions than positive emotions; we feel "more anxious to communicate to our friends" (p. 13) our negative emotions.

Smith proposes that mutual sympathy heightens the original emotion and "disburdens" the person of sorrow. This is a "relief" model of mutual sympathy, where mutual sympathy heightens the sorrow but also produces pleasure from relief "because the sweetness of his sympathy more than compensates the bitterness of that sorrow" (p. 14). In contrast, mocking or joking about their sorrow is the "cruelest insult" one can inflict on another person:

To seem to not be affected by the joy of our companions is but want of politeness; but to not wear a serious countentance when they tell us their afflictions, is real and gross inhumanity (p. 14).

He makes clear that mutual sympathy of negative emotions is a necessary condition for friendship, whereas mutual sympathy of positive emotions is desirable but not required. This is due to the "healing consolation of mutual sympathy" that a friend is "required" to provide in response to "grief and resentment", as if not doing so would be akin to a failure to help the physically wounded.

Not only do we get pleasure from the sympathy of others, but we also obtain pleasure from being able to successfully sympathize with others, and discomfort from failing to do so. Sympathizing is pleasurable, failing to sympathize is aversive. Smith also makes the case that failing to sympathize with another person may not be aversive to ourselves but we may find the emotion of the other person unfounded and blame them, as when another person experiences great happiness or sadness in response to an event that we think should not warrant such a response.

===== Part I, Section I, Chapter III: Of the manner in which we judge of the propriety or impropriety of the affections of other men by their concord or dissonance with our own =====
Smith presents the argument that approval or disapproval of the feelings of others is completely determined by whether we sympathize or fail to sympathize with their emotions. Specifically, if we sympathize with the feelings of another we judge that their feelings are just, and if we do not sympathize we judge that their feelings are unjust.

This holds in matters of opinion also, as Smith flatly states that we judge the opinions of others as correct or incorrect merely by determining whether they agree with our own opinions. Smith also cites a few examples where our judgment is not in line with our emotions and sympathy, as when we judge the sorrow of a stranger who has lost her mother as being justified even though we know nothing about the stranger and do not sympathize ourselves. However, according to Smith these non-emotional judgments are not independent from sympathy in that although we do not feel sympathy we do recognize that sympathy would be appropriate and lead us to this judgment and thus deem the judgment as correct.

"Utopian" or Ideal Political Systems: "The man of system . . . is apt to be very wise in his own conceit; and is often so enamoured with the supposed beauty of his own ideal plan of government, that he cannot suffer the smallest deviation from any part of it. He goes on to establish it completely and in all its parts, without any regard either to the great interests, or to the strong prejudices which may oppose it. He seems to imagine that he can arrange the different members of a great society with as much ease as the hand arranges the different pieces upon a chess-board. He does not consider that the pieces upon the chess-board have no other principle of motion besides that which the hand impresses upon them; but that, in the great chess-board of human society, every single piece has a principle of motion of its own, altogether different from that which the legislature might choose to impress upon it. If those two principles coincide and act in the same direction, the game of human society will go on easily and harmoniously, and is very likely to be happy and successful. If they are opposite or different, the game will go on miserably, and the society must be at all times in the highest degree of disorder."

— Adam Smith, The Theory of Moral Sentiments, 1759

Next, Smith puts forth that not only are the consequences of one's actions judged and used to determine whether one is just or unjust in committing them, but also whether one's sentiments justified the action that brought about the consequences. Thus, sympathy plays a role in determining judgments of the actions of others in that if we sympathize with the affections that brought about the action we are more likely to judge the action as just, and vice versa:

If upon bringing the case home to our own breast we find that the sentiments which it gives occasion to, coincide and tally with our own, we necessarily approve of them as proportioned and suitable to their objects; if otherwise, we necessarily disapprove of them, as extravagant and out of proportion (p. 20).

===== Part I, Section I, Chapter IV: The same subject continued =====
Smith delineates two conditions under which we judge the "propriety or impropriety of the sentiments of another person":

- 1 When the objects of the sentiments are considered alone
- 2 When the objects of the sentiments are considered in relation to the person or other persons

When one's sentiments coincide with another person's when the object is considered alone, then we judge that their sentiment is justified. Smith lists objects that are in one of two domains: science and taste. Smith argues that sympathy does not play a role in judgments of these objects; differences in judgment arise only due to difference in attention or mental acuity between people. When the judgment of another person agrees with us on these types of objects it is not notable; however, when another person's judgment differs from us, we assume that they have some special ability to discern characteristics of the object we have not already noticed, and thus view their judgment with special approbation called admiration.

Smith continues by noting that we assign value to judgments not based on usefulness (utility) but on similarity to our own judgment, and we attribute to those judgments which are in line with our own the qualities of correctness or truth in science, and justness or delicateness in taste. Thus, the utility of a judgment is "plainly an afterthought" and "not what first recommends them to our approbation" (p. 24).

Of objects that fall into the second category, such as the misfortune of oneself or another person, Smith argues that there is no common starting point for judgment but are vastly more important in maintaining social relations. Judgments of the first kind are irrelevant as long as one is able to share a sympathetic sentiment with another person; people may converse in total disagreement about objects of the first kind as long as each person appreciates the sentiments of the other to a reasonable degree. However, people become intolerable to each other when they have no feeling or sympathy for the misfortunes or resentment of the other: "You are confounded at my violence and passion, and I am enraged at your cold insensibility and want of feelings" (p. 26).

Another important point Smith makes is that our sympathy will never reach the degree or "violence" of the person who experiences it, as our own "safety" and comfort as well as separation from the offending object constantly "intrude" on our efforts to induce a sympathetic state in ourselves. Thus, sympathy is never enough, as the "sole consolation" for the sufferer is "to see the emotions of their hearts, in every respect, beat time to his own, in the violent and disagreeable passions" (p. 28). Therefore, the original sufferer is likely to dampen his feelings to be in "concord" with the degree of sentiment expressible by the other person, who feels only due to the ability of one's imagination. It is this which is "sufficient for the harmony of society" (p. 28). Not only does the person dampen his expression of suffering for the purpose of sympathizing, but he also takes the perspective of the other person who is not suffering, thus slowly changing his perspective and allowing the calmness of the other person and reduction of violence of the sentiment to improve his spirits.

As a friend is likely to engage in more sympathy than a stranger, a friend actually slows the reduction in our sorrows because we do not temper our feelings out of sympathizing with the perspective of the friend to the degree that we reduce our sentiments in the presence of acquaintances, or a group of acquaintances. This gradual tempering of our sorrows from the repeated perspective-taking of someone in a more calm state make "society and conversation...the most powerful remedies for restoring the mind to its tranquility" (p. 29).

===== Part I, Section I, Chapter V: Of the amiable and respectable virtues =====
Smith starts to use an important new distinction in this section and late in the previous section:

- The "person principally concerned": The person who has had emotions aroused by an object
- The spectator: The person observing and sympathizing with the emotionally aroused "person principally concerned"

These two people have two different sets of virtues. The person principally concerned, in "bring[ing] down emotions to what the spectator can go along with" (p. 30), demonstrates "self-denial" and "self-government" whereas the spectator displays "the candid condescension and indulgent humanity" of "enter[ing]into the sentiments of the person principally concerned."

Smith returns to anger and how we find "detestable...the insolence and brutality" of the person principally concerned but "admire...the indignation which they naturally call forth in that of the impartial spectator" (p. 32). Smith concludes that the "perfection" of human nature is this mutual sympathy, or "love our neighbor as we love ourself" by "feeling much for others and little for ourself" and to indulge in "benevolent affections" (p. 32). Smith makes clear that it is this ability to "self-command" our "ungovernable passions" through sympathizing with others that is virtuous.

Smith further distinguishes between virtue and propriety:

==== Part I, Section II: Of the degrees of which different passions are consistent with propriety ====
Section 2 consists of 5 chapters:

- Chapter 1: Of the passions which take their origins from the body
- Chapter 2: Of the passions which take their origins from a particular turn or habit of the imagination
- Chapter 3: Of the unsocial passions
- Chapter 4: Of the social passions
- Chapter 5: Of the selfish passions

Smith starts off by noting that the spectator can sympathize only with passions of medium "pitch". However, this medium level at which the spectator can sympathize depends on what "passion" or emotion is being expressed; with some emotions even the most justified expression of cannot be tolerated at a high level of fervor, at others sympathy in the spectator is not bounded by magnitude of expression even though the emotion is not as well justified. Again, Smith emphasizes that specific passions will be considered appropriate or inappropriate to varying degrees depending on the degree to which the spectator is able to sympathize, and that it is the purpose of this section to specify which passions evoke sympathy and which do not and therefore which are deemed appropriate and not appropriate.

===== Part I, Section II, Chapter I: Of the passions which take their origins from the body =====
Since it is not possible to sympathize with bodily states or "appetites which take their origin in the body" it is improper to display them to others, according to Smith. One example is "eating voraciously" when hungry, as the impartial spectator can sympathize a little bit if there is a vivid description and good cause for this hunger, but not to a great extent as hunger itself cannot be induced from mere description. Smith also includes sex as a passion of the body that is considered indecent in the expression of others, although he does make note that to fail to treat a woman with more "gaiety, pleasantry, and attention" would also be improper of a man (p. 39). To express pain is also considered unbecoming.

Smith believes the cause of lack of sympathy for these bodily passions is that "we cannot enter into them" ourselves (p. 40). Temperance, by Smith's account, is to have control over bodily passions.

On the contrary, passions of the imagination, such as loss of love or ambition, are easy to sympathize with because our imagination can conform to the shape of the sufferer, whereas our body cannot do such a thing to the body of the sufferer. Pain is fleeting and the harm only lasts as long as the violence is inflicted, whereas an insult lasts to harm for longer duration because our imagination keeps mulling it over. Likewise, bodily pain that induces fear, such as a cut, wound or fracture, evoke sympathy because of the danger that they imply for ourselves; that is, sympathy is activated chiefly through imagining what it would be like for us.

===== Part I, Section II, Chapter II: Of the passions which take their origins from a particular turn or habit of the imagination =====
Passions which "take their origins from a particular turn or habit of the imagination" are "little sympathized with". These include love, as we are unlikely to enter into our own feeling of love in response to that of another person and thus unlikely to sympathize. He further states that love is "always laughed at, because we cannot enter into it" ourselves.

Instead of inspiring love in ourselves, and thus sympathy, love makes the impartial spectator sensitive to the situation and emotions that may arise from the gain or loss of love. Again this is because it is easy to imagine hoping for love or dreading loss of love but not the actual experience of it, and that the "happy passion, upon this account, interests us much less than the fearful and the melancholy" of losing happiness (p. 49). Thus, love inspires sympathy for not for love itself but for the anticipation of emotions from gaining or losing it.

Smith, however, finds love "ridiculous" but "not naturally odious" (p. 50). Thus, we sympathize with the "humaneness, generosity, kindness, friendship, and esteem" (p. 50) of love. However, as these secondary emotions are excessive in love, one should not express them but in moderate tones according to Smith, as:

All these are objects which we cannot expect should interest our companions in the same degree in which they interest us.

Failing to do so makes bad company, and therefore those with specific interests and "love" of hobbies should keep their passions to those with kindred spirits ("A philosopher is company to a philosopher only" (p. 51)) or to themselves.

===== Part I, Section II, Chapter III: Of the unsocial passions =====
Smith talks of hatred and resentment next, as "unsocial passions." According to Smith these are passions of imagination, but sympathy is only likely to be evoked in the impartial spectator when they are expressed in moderate tones. Because these passions regard two people, namely the offended (resentful or angry person) and the offender, our sympathies are naturally drawn between these two. Specifically, although we sympathize with the offended person, we fear that the offended person may do harm to the offender, and thus also fear for and sympathize with the danger that faces the offender.

The impartial spectator sympathizes with the offended person in a manner, as emphasized previously, such that the greatest sympathy occurs when the offended person expresses anger or resentment in a temperate manner. Specifically, if the offended person seems just and temperate in coping with the offense, then this magnifies the misdeed done to the offended in the mind of the spectator, increasing sympathy. Although excess anger does not beget sympathy, neither does too little anger, as this may signal fear or uncaring on the part of the offended. This lack of response is just as despicable to the impartial spectator as is the excesses of anger.

However, in general, any expression of anger is improper in the presence of others. This is because the "immediate effects [of anger] are disagreeable" just as the knives of surgery are disagreeable for art, as the immediate effect of surgery is unpleasant even though long-term effect is justified. Likewise, even when anger is justly provoked, it is disagreeable. According to Smith, this explains why we reserve sympathy until we know the cause of the anger or resentment, since, if the emotion is not justified by the action of another person, then the immediate disagreeableness and threat to the other person (and by sympathy to ourselves) overwhelm any sympathy that the spectator may have for the offended. In response to expressions of anger, hatred, or resentment, it is likely that the impartial spectator will not feel anger in sympathy with the offended but instead anger toward the offended for expressing such an aversive. Smith believes that there is some form of natural optimality to the aversiveness of these emotions, as it reduces the propagation of ill will among people, and thus increases the probability of functional societies.

Smith also puts forth that anger, hatred, and resentment are disagreeable to the offended mostly because of the idea of being offended rather than the actual offense itself. He remarks that we are likely able to do without what was taken from us, but it is the imagination which angers us at the thought of having something taken. Smith closes this section by remarking that the impartial spectator will not sympathize with us unless we are willing to endure harms, with the goal of maintaining positive social relations and humanity, with equanimity, as long as it does not put us in a situation of being "exposed to perpetual insults" (p. 59). It is only "with reluctance, from necessity, and in consequence of great and repeated provocations" (p. 60) that we should take revenge on others. Smith makes clear that we should take very good care to not act on the passions of anger, hatred, resentment, for purely social reasons, and instead imagine what the impartial spectator would deem appropriate, and base our action solely on a cold calculation.

===== Part I, Section II, Chapter IV: Of the social passions =====
The social emotions such as "generosity, humanity, kindness, compassion, mutual friendship and esteem" are considered overwhelmingly with approbation by the impartial spectator. The agreeableness of the "benevolent" sentiments leads to full sympathy on the part of the spectator with both the person concerned and the object of these emotions and are not felt as aversive to the spectator if they are in excess.

===== Part I, Section II, Chapter V: Of the selfish passions =====
The final set of passions, or "selfish passions", are grief and joy, which Smith considers to be not so aversive as the unsocial passions of anger and resentment, but not so benevolent as the social passions such as generosity and humanity. Smith makes clear in this passage that the impartial spectator is unsympathetic to the unsocial emotions because they put the offended and the offender in opposition to each other, sympathetic to the social emotions because they join the lover and beloved in unison, and feels somewhere in between with the selfish passions as they are either good or bad for only one person and are not disagreeable but not so magnificent as the social emotions.

Of grief and joy, Smith notes that small joys and great grief are assured to be returned with sympathy from the impartial spectator, but not other degrees of these emotions. Great joy is likely to be met with envy, so modesty is prudent for someone who has come upon great fortune or else suffer the consequences of envy and disapprobation. This is appropriate as the spectator appreciates the lucky individual's "sympathy with our envy and aversion to his happiness" especially because this shows concern for the inability of the spectator to reciprocate the sympathy toward the happiness of the lucky individual. According to Smith, this modesty wears on the sympathy of both the lucky individual and the old friends of the lucky individual and they soon part ways; likewise, the lucky individual may acquire new friends of higher rank to whom he must also be modest, apologizing for the "mortification" of now being their equal:

He generally grows weary too soon, and is provoked, by the sullen and suspicious pride of the one, and by the saucy contempt of the other, to treat the first with neglect, and the second with petulance, till at last he grows habitually insolent, and forfeits the esteem of them all... those sudden changes of fortune seldom contribute much to happiness (p. 66).

The solution is to ascend social rank by gradual steps, with the path cleared for one by approbation before one takes the next step, giving people time to adjust, and thus avoiding any "jealousy in those he overtakes, or any envy in those he leaves behind" (p. 66).

Small joys of everyday life are met with sympathy and approbation according to Smith. These "frivolous nothings which fill up the void of human life" (p. 67) divert attention and help us forget problems, reconciling us as with a lost friend.

The opposite is true for grief, with small grief triggering no sympathy in the impartial spectator, but large grief with much sympathy. Small griefs are likely, and appropriately, turned into joke and mockery by the sufferer, as the sufferer knows how complaining about small grievances to the impartial spectator will evoke ridicule in the heart of the spectator, and thus the sufferer sympathizes with this, mocking himself to some degree.

==== Part I, Section III: Of the effects of prosperity and adversity upon the judgment of mankind with regard to the propriety of action; and why it is more easy to obtain their approbation in the one state than in the other ====
Section 3 consists of 3 chapters:

- Chapter 1: That though our Sympathy with Sorrow is generally a more lively Sensation than our Sympathy with Joy, it commonly falls much more short of the Violence of what is naturally felt by the Person principally concerned
- Chapter 2: Of the Origin of Ambition, and of the Distinction of Ranks
- Chapter 3: Of the Corruption of our Moral Sentiments, which is occasioned by this Disposition to admire the Rich and the Great, and to despise or neglect Persons of poor and mean Condition

===== Part I, Section III, Chapter II: Of the Origin of Ambition, and of the Distinction of Ranks =====
Smith says that rich people glory in their riches because they feel that their riches draw the world's attention upon them, and that mankind is disposed to go along with the rich in whatever agreeable emotions their situational advantages inspire them with, whereas the poor are ashamed of their poverty because they feel that it places them out of mankind's sight, and that whoever notices the poor would have little to no sympathy for them.

The negative experiences of the affluent elicit ten times as much compassion and resentment in spectators than if such experiences were to have happened to other people. If a stranger to human nature observed people being indifferent to the misery of those beneath them and feeling regret and indignation for the negative experiences of those above them, they would be apt to imagine that pain and death are worse for people of higher rank than they would be for everyone else.

The distinction of ranks and the order of society are founded upon mankind's disposition to go along with the passions of the rich and powerful. The people tend to defer to those they are accustomed to looking upon as their natural superiors.

They cannot stand the mortification of their monarch. Compassion soon takes the place of resentment, they forget all past provocations, their old principles of loyalty revive, and they run to re-establish the ruined authority of their old masters, with the same violence with which they had opposed it. The death of Charles I brought about the Restoration of the royal family. Compassion for James II when he was seized by the populace in making his escape on ship-board, had almost prevented the Revolution, and made it go on more heavily than before.

===== Part I, Section III, Chapter III: Of the Corruption of our Moral Sentiments, which is occasioned by this Disposition to admire the Rich and the Great, and to despise or neglect Persons of poor and mean Condition =====
Smith says that, although the admiration of the rich and powerful and the neglect of the poor are necessary to establish and maintain the distinction of ranks and the order of society, the disposition to do so is simultaneously the great and most universal cause of the corruption of our moral sentiments. The respect and admiration of wealth and greatness, and the bestowment of contempt upon poverty and weakness, has been the complaint of moralists throughout the ages.

We desire both to be respectable and to be respected. We dread both to be contemptible and to be contemned. But, upon coming into the world, we soon find that wisdom and virtue are by no means the sole objects of respect; nor vice and folly, of contempt. We frequently see the respectful attentions of the world more strongly directed towards the rich and the great, than towards the wise and the virtuous. We see frequently the vices and follies of the powerful much less despised than the poverty and weakness of the innocent. To deserve, to acquire, and to enjoy the respect and admiration of mankind, are the great objects of ambition and emulation.

Two different roads are presented to us, equally leading to the attainment of this so much desired object; the one, by the study of wisdom and the practice of virtue; the other, by the acquisition of wealth and greatness. Two different characters are presented to our emulation; the one, of proud ambition and ostentatious avidity. the other, of humble modesty and equitable justice. Two different models, two different pictures, are held out to us, according to which we may fashion our own character and behaviour; the one more gaudy and glittering in its colouring; the other more correct and more exquisitely beautiful in its outline: the one forcing itself upon the notice of every wandering eye; the other, attracting the attention of scarce any body but the most studious and careful observer. They are the wise and the virtuous chiefly, a select, though, I am afraid, but a small party, who are the real and steady admirers of wisdom and virtue. The great mob of mankind are the admirers and worshippers, and, what may seem more extraordinary, most frequently the disinterested admirers and worshippers, of wealth and greatness.

In the superior stations of life the case is unhappily not always the same. In the courts of princes, in the drawing-rooms of the great, where success and preferment depend, not upon the esteem of intelligent and well-informed equals, but upon the fanciful and foolish favour of ignorant, presumptuous, and proud superiors; flattery and falsehood too often prevail over merit and abilities. In such societies the abilities to please, are more regarded than the abilities to serve. In quiet and peaceable times, when the storm is at a distance, the prince, or great man, wishes only to be amused, and is even apt to fancy that he has scarce any occasion for the service of any body, or that those who amuse him are sufficiently able to serve him.

The external graces, the frivolous accomplishments of that impertinent and foolish thing called a man of fashion, are commonly more admired than the solid and masculine virtues of a warrior, a statesman, a philosopher, or a legislator. All the great and awful virtues, all the virtues which can fit, either for the council, the senate, or the field, are, by the insolent and insignificant flatterers, who commonly figure the most in such corrupted societies, held in the utmost contempt and derision.

When the duke of Sully was called upon by Lewis the Thirteenth, to give his advice in some great emergency, he observed the favourites and courtiers whispering to one another, and smiling at his unfashionable appearance. 'Whenever your majesty's father,' said the old warrior and statesman, 'did me the honour to consult me, he ordered the buffoons of the court to retire into the antechamber.'

It is from our disposition to admire, and consequently to imitate, the rich and the great, that they are enabled to set, or to lead what is called the fashion. Their dress is the fashionable dress; the language of their conversation, the fashionable style; their air and deportment, the fashionable behaviour. Even their vices and follies are fashionable; and the greater part of men are proud to imitate and resemble them in the very qualities which dishonour and degrade them.

Vain men often give themselves airs of a fashionable profligacy, which, in their hearts, they do not approve of, and of which, perhaps, they are really not guilty. They desire to be praised for what they themselves do not think praise-worthy, and are ashamed of unfashionable virtues which they sometimes practise in secret, and for which they have secretly some degree of real veneration. There are hypocrites of wealth and greatness, as well as of religion and virtue; and a vain man is as apt to pretend to be what he is not, in the one way, as a cunning man is in the other. He assumes the equipage and splendid way of living of his superiors, without considering that whatever may be praise-worthy in any of these, derives its whole merit and propriety from its suitableness to that situation and fortune which both require and can easily support the expence.

Many poor people place their glory in being thought of as rich without considering that the responsibilities of being rich would reduce them to beggary and render their situation still less like that of those they admire and imitate than it had been originally.

=== Part II. Of Merit and Demerit; or, of the Objects of Reward and Punishment ===
==== Section I. Of the Sense of Merit and Demerit ====
Chap. I. That whatever appears to be the proper Object of Gratitude, appears to deserve Reward; and that, in the same Manner, whatever appears to be the proper Object of Resentment, appears to deserve Punishment

Chap. II. Of the proper Objects of Gratitude and Resentment

Chap. III. That where there is no Approbation of the Conduct of the Person who confers the Benefit, there is little Sympathy with the Gratitude of him who receives it: and that, on the contrary, where there is no Disapprobation of the Motives of the Person who does the Mischief, there is no sort of Sympathy with the Resentment of him who suffers it

Chap. V. The analysis of the sense of Merit and Demerit

==== Section II. Of Justice and Beneficence ====
Chap. I. Comparison of those two virtues

Chap. II. Of the sense of Justice, of Remorse, and of the consciousness of Merit

Chap. III. Of the utility of this constitution of Nature

Chap. IV. Recapitulation of the foregoing chapters

==== Section III. Of the Influence of Fortune upon the Sentiments of Mankind, with regard to the Merit or Demerit of Actions ====
Chap. I. Of the causes of this Influence of Fortune

Chap. II. Of the extent of this influence of fortune

Chap. III. Of the final cause of this Irregularity of Sentiments

=== Part V, Chapter I: Of the influence of Custom and Fashion upon the Sentiments of Approbation and Disapprobation ===
Smith argues that two principles, custom and fashion, pervasively influence judgment. These are based on the modern psychological concept of associativity: Stimuli presented closely in time or space become mentally linked over time and repeated exposure. In Smith's own words:

When two objects have frequently been seen together, the imagination requires a habit of passing easily from one to the other. If the first is to appear, we lay our account that the second is to follow. Of their own accord they put us in mind of one another, and the attention glides easily along them. (p. 1)

Regarding custom, Smith argues that approbation occurs when stimuli are presented according to how one is accustomed to viewing them and disapprobation occurs when they are presented in a way that one is not accustomed to. Thus, Smith argues for social relativity of judgment meaning that beauty and correctness are determined more by what one has previously been exposed to rather than an absolute principle. Although Smith places greater weight on this social determination he does not discount absolute principles completely, instead he argues that evaluations are rarely inconsistent with custom, therefore giving greater weight to customs than absolutes:

I cannot, however, be induced to believe that our sense of external beauty is founded altogether on custom...But though I cannot admit that custom is the sole principle of beauty, yet I can so far allow the truth of this ingenious system as to grant, that there is scarce any one external form to please, if quite contrary to custom...(pp. 14–15).

Smith continues by arguing that fashion is a particular "species" of custom. Fashion is specifically the association of stimuli with people of high rank, for example, a certain type of clothes with a notable person such as a king or a renowned artist. This is because the "graceful, easy, and commanding manners of the great" (p. 3) person are frequently associated with the other aspects of the person of high rank (e.g., clothes, manners), thus bestowing upon the other aspects the "graceful" quality of the person. In this way objects become fashionable. Smith includes not only clothes and furniture in the sphere of fashion, but also taste, music, poetry, architecture, and physical beauty.

Smith also points out that people should be relatively reluctant to change styles from what they are accustomed to even if a new style is equal to or slightly better than current fashion: "A man would be ridiculous who should appear in public with a suit of clothes quite different from those which are commonly worn, though the new dress be ever so graceful or convenient" (p. 7).

Physical beauty, according to Smith, is also determined by the principle of custom. He argues that each "class" of things has a "peculiar conformation which is approved of" and that the beauty of each member of a class is determined by the extent to which it has the most "usual" manifestation of that "conformation":

Thus, in the human form, the beauty of each feature lies in a certain middle, equally removed from a variety of other forms that are ugly. (pp. 10–11).

=== Part V, Chapter II: Of the influence of Custom and Fashion upon Moral Sentiments ===
Smith argues that the influence of custom is reduced in the sphere of moral judgment. Specifically, he argues that there are bad things that no custom can bring approbation to:

But the characters and conduct of a Nero, or a Claudius, are what no custom will ever reconcile us to, what no fashion will ever render agreeable; but the one will always be the object of dread and hatred; the other of scorn and derision. (pp. 15–16).

Smith further argues for a "natural" right and wrong, and that custom amplifies the moral sentiments when one's customs are consistent with nature, but dampens moral sentiments when one's customs are inconsistent with nature.

Fashion also has an effect on moral sentiment. The vices of people of high rank, such as the licentiousness of Charles VIII, are associated with the "freedom and independency, with frankness, generosity, humanity, and politeness" of the "superiors" and thus the vices are endued with these characteristics.

== See also ==
- Generalized other
- History of economic thought
- Sentimentality
