= List of political ideologies =

In political science, a political ideology is a certain set of ethical ideals, principles, doctrines, myths or symbols of a social movement, institution, class or large group that explains how society should work and offers some political and cultural blueprint for a certain social order.

A political ideology largely concerns itself with how to allocate power and to what ends it should be used. Some political parties follow a certain ideology very closely while others may take broad inspiration from a group of related ideologies without specifically embracing any one of them.

An ideology's popularity is partly due to the influence of moral entrepreneurs, who sometimes act in their own interests. Political ideologies have two dimensions: (1) goals: how society should be organized; and (2) methods: the most appropriate way to achieve this goal.

An ideology is a collection of ideas. Typically, each ideology contains certain ideas on what it considers to be the best form of government (e.g. autocracy or democracy) and the best economic system (e.g. capitalism, socialism, or communism). The same word is sometimes used to identify both an ideology and one of its main ideas.

For instance, socialism may refer to an economic system, or it may refer to an ideology that supports that economic system. The same term may also refer to multiple ideologies, which is why political scientists try to find consensus definitions for these terms.

For example, while the terms have been conflated at times, communism has come in common parlance and in academics to refer to Soviet-type regimes and Marxist–Leninist ideologies, whereas socialism has come to refer to a wider range of differing ideologies which are most often distinct from Marxism–Leninism.

Political ideology is a term fraught with problems, having been called "the most elusive concept in the whole of social science".

While ideologies tend to identify themselves by their position on the political spectrum (such as the left, the centre or the right), they can be distinguished from political strategies (e.g. populism as it is commonly defined) and from single issues around which a party may be built (e.g. civil libertarianism and support or opposition to European integration), although either of these may or may not be central to a particular ideology. Several studies show that political ideology is heritable within families.

The following list is strictly alphabetical and attempts to divide the ideologies found in practical political life into several groups, with each group containing ideologies that are related to each other. The headers refer to the names of the best-known ideologies in each group.

The names of the headers do not necessarily imply some hierarchical order or that one ideology evolved out of the other. Instead, they are merely noting that the ideologies in question are practically, historically, and ideologically related to each other.

As such, one ideology can belong to several groups and there is sometimes considerable overlap between related ideologies. The meaning of a political label can also differ between countries and political parties often subscribe to a combination of ideologies.

== Anarchism ==
Political internationals

- Anarkismo (platformism and specifism)
- Informal Anarchist Federation (insurrectionary anarchism)
- International of Anarchist Federations (synthesis anarchism)
- International Confederation of Labor (anarcho-syndicalism and revolutionary syndicalism)
- International Workers' Association (anarcho-syndicalism)

=== Classical ===
- Individualist anarchism
  - Egoist anarchism
  - Illegalism
  - Philosophical anarchism
- Libertarianism
  - Left-libertarianism
  - Libertarian socialism
- Mutualism
- Social anarchism
  - Anarcho-communism
    - Magonism
      - Neozapatismo
  - Anarcho-syndicalism
  - Collectivist anarchism

=== Post-classical ===
- Anarcho-capitalism
- Anarcha-feminism
- Anarchism without adjectives
- Anarchist synthesis
- Anarcho-pacifism
- Cantonalism
- Green anarchism
  - Anarcho-primitivism
  - Social ecology
    - Communalism
      - Municipalism
        - Democratic Confederalism
          - Jineology
  - Veganarchism
- Insurrectionary anarchism
- Platformism

=== Contemporary ===
- Anarcho-transhumanism
- Black anarchism
- Communization
- Market anarchism
- Post-anarchism
- Post-colonial anarchism
- Post-left anarchism
- Queer anarchism

=== Religious variants ===
- Buddhist anarchism
- Christian anarchism
- Islamic anarchism
- Jewish anarchism

== Authoritarianism ==
=== General ===
- Absolute monarchism
- Autocracy
  - Caesarism
  - Caudillismo
- Despotism
  - Soft despotism
- Dictatorship
  - Benevolent dictatorship
  - Constitutional dictatorship
  - Civilian dictatorship
  - Dictablanda
  - Left-wing dictatorship
  - Military dictatorship
    - Stratocracy
  - Right-wing dictatorship
- Imperialism
  - Civilizing mission
  - Colonialism
    - Exploitation colonialism
    - Internal colonialism
    - Neocolonialism
    - Settler colonialism
      - Lebensraum
      - Manifest destiny
    - Slavocracy
- Kraterocracy
  - Mafia state
- Managerial state
- Ochlocracy
- Oligarchy
  - Aristocracy
  - Minoritarianism
  - Technocracy
    - Algocracy
    - Cyberocracy
- Plutocracy
  - Bankocracy
  - Corporatocracy
  - Timocracy
- Police state
  - Counterintelligence state
- Soft authoritarianism
- Totalitarianism
  - Ideocracy
  - Totalitarian democracy
- Transnational repression
- Unitarism

=== Other ===
- Authoritarian capitalism
  - Corporate capitalism
  - State capitalism
- Authoritarian socialism
  - Leninism
    - Stalinism
    - Trotskyism
    - Castroism
    - Titoism
    - Marxism–Leninism
      - National Bolshevism
  - Anti-revisionist Marxism
    - Hoxhaism
    - Maoism
  - Blanquism
- Authoritarian conservatism
  - Fitzhughism
  - Monarchism
- Authoritarian democracy
- Authoritarian populism
- Byzantinism
- Digital authoritarianism
- Ecoauthoritarianism
- Liberal autocracy
- Minoritarianism
- Neo-feudalism
- Far-right ultranationalism authoritarianism
  - Fascism
    - Falangism
    - Nazism
    - Neo-fascism
      - Neo-Nazism
        - Nazi-Maoism
      - Neo-Legionarism
      - Third Positionism

=== Opposition ===
- Anti-authoritarianism
- Anti-monarchism
  - Monarchomachs
- Decolonization

=== Religious variants ===
- Theocracy

=== Regional variants ===
==== African ====
- Central African Republic
- Congo
- Egypt
- Equatorial Guinea
- Libya
- South Africa
- Sudan
- Uganda
- Zimbabwe

==== American ====
- Argentina
- Bolivia
- Brazil
  - Bolsonarism
- Chile
  - Pinochetism
- Cuba
- Dominican Republic
- Guatemala
- Haiti
- Honduras
- Mexico
- Nicaragua
- Panama
- Paraguay
- Peru
- United States
  - Trumpism
- Venezuela

==== Asian ====
- Afghanistan
- Cambodia
- China
  - Chiangism
- Indonesia
- Iraq
- Iran
- Japan
- Kazakhstan
- Myanmar
- North Korea
- Pakistan
  - Ziaism
- Philippines
- Saudi Arabia
- South Korea
  - Ilminism
- Syria
- Tajikistan
- Thailand
- Turkey
- Turkmenistan
- United Arab Emirates
- Uzbekistan

==== European ====
- Belarus
- France
- Germany
- Greece
- Hungary
- Italy
- Portugal
- Romania
- Russia
  - Putinism
- Serbia
- Spain

== Communitarianism ==
=== General ===
- Christian democracy
- Communitarian corporatism
- Democratic confederalism
- Distributism
- Georgism
- Mutualism
- Person Dignity Theory
- Radical centrism
- Third Way

=== Other ===
- Christian socialism
- Eurasianism
- Freiwirtschaft
- Pre-Marxist communism
- Primitive communism
- Religious communism
  - Christian communism
  - Islamic communism
  - Jewish communism
- Utopian socialism

=== Regional variants ===
- Kibbutz
- Obshchina
- Singapore
- Zadruga

== Communism ==
The Hammer and sickle symbol

Political internationals

- Committee for a Workers' International (Trotskyism)
- Coordinating Committee for the Refoundation of the Fourth International (Trotskyism)
- Fourth International (Trotskyism)
- Fourth International (post-reunification) (Trotskyism)
- Fourth International Posadist (Trotskyism)
- International Bolshevik Tendency (Trotskyism)
- International Committee of the Fourth International (Trotskyism)
- International Communist Current (left communism)
- International Communist League (Fourth Internationalist) (Trotskyism)
- International Communist Party (left communism)
- International Conference of Marxist–Leninist Parties and Organizations (International Newsletter) (Maoism)
- International Conference of Marxist–Leninist Parties and Organizations (Unity & Struggle) (Hoxhaism)
- International League of Peoples' Struggle (Marxism–Leninism–Maoism)
- International Meeting of Communist and Workers Parties (Marxism–Leninism)
- International Socialist Alternative (Trotskyism)
- International Socialist Tendency (unorthodox Trotskyism)
- International Workers League – Fourth International (Trotskyism)
- Internationalist Communist Union (Trotskyism)
- League for the Fifth International (Trotskyism)
- League for the Fourth International (Trotskyism)
- Trotskyist Fraction – Fourth International (Trotskyism)
- World Socialist Movement (anti-Leninism, classical Marxism, impossibilism and international socialism)
- Workers International to Rebuild the Fourth International (Trotskyism)

=== Authoritarian ===
- Barracks communism
  - Nechayevshchina
- Blanquism
- Bordigism
- Nechayevism
- Tkachevism

==== Leninism ====
- Democratic centralism
- Trotskyism
  - Archeio-Marxism
  - Orthodox Trotskyism
  - Pabloism
  - Posadism
  - Third camp Trotskyism
- Vanguardism
- War communism

===== Marxism–Leninism =====
- Brezhnevism
  - Real socialism
- Castroism
- Ceaușism
- Dubčekism
- Gorbachevism
  - Glasnost
  - Perestroika
- Guevarism
  - Focalism
- Ho Chi Minh Thought
  - Kaysone Phomvihane Thought
- Hoxhaism
- Husakism
- Juche
  - Kimilsungism
  - Kimilsungism–Kimjongilism
  - Songun
- Kadarism
- Khrushchevism
  - De-Stalinization
  - Khrushchev Thaw
- Maoism
  - Maoism–Third Worldism
    - Third Worldism
    - Third World socialism
  - New Synthesis
  - Mao-Spontex
  - Marxism–Leninism–Maoism
    - Gonzalo Thought
    - Marxism–Leninism–Maoism–Prachanda Path
      - People's Multiparty Democracy
    - National Democracy
    - Naxalism
  - Pol Potism
  - Socialism with Chinese characteristics
    - Deng Xiaoping Theory
    - Mao Zedong Thought
    - Scientific Outlook on Development
    - Three Principles of the People
    - Three Represents
    - Xi Jinping Thought
- Marxist–Leninist atheism
- Scientific communism
- Stalinism
  - Anti-revisionism
  - Neo-Stalinism
  - Socialism in one country
    - National communism
    - National Bolshevism
    - Socialist patriotism
      - Soviet socialist patriotism
        - Soviet nostalgia
  - Soviet anti-Zionism
- Titoism
  - Đilasism
  - Rankovićism
  - Socialist nationalism
    - Socialist Yugoslavism
      - Yugo-nostalgia

=== Libertarian ===
- Anarcho-communism
  - Egoist communism
- Communard movement

==== Marxism ====
- Classical Marxism
  - Orthodox Marxism
    - Impossibilism
      - World Socialist Movement
    - Kautskyism
    - Luxemburgism
      - Spartacism
- Libertarian Marxism
  - Autonomism
    - Workerism
  - Left communism
    - Vperedism
    - Bordigism
    - Communization
    - Council communism
    - Socialisme ou Barbarie
    - Solidarity
    - Situationism
    - Spontaneism
    - Ultra-leftism
  - Mao-Spontex
  - Marxism–De Leonism
  - Unorthodox Trotskyism
    - Chaulieu–Montal tendency
    - Johnson–Forest tendency
    - Third camp
      - Shachtmanism
        - Left Shachtmanism
  - Open Marxism
- Western Marxism
  - Austro-Marxism
  - Frankfurt School
  - Freudo-Marxism
  - Hegelian Marxism
  - Marxist humanism
    - Budapest School
    - Praxis School
  - Neo-Marxism
    - Analytical Marxism
    - Conflict theories
      - Dependency theory
      - Social conflict theory
      - World-systems theory
    - Freudo–Marxism
    - Gramscianism
      - Italian road to socialism
      - Neo-Gramscianism
    - Instrumental Marxism
    - Neue Marx-Lektüre
    - Political Marxism
    - Structural Marxism
      - Democratic road to socialism
  - Post-Marxism
    - Radical democracy
      - Abahlali baseMjondolo
      - Landless Workers' Movement
      - Piqueteros
      - Zapatistas
        - Neozapatismo

=== Other ===
- Centrist Marxism
- Eco-communism
- Eurocommunism
- Fully automated luxury communism
- International communism
- Marxist democracy
- National communism
  - Tan Malaka Thought
- Primitive communism
- Pre-Marxist communism
- Queer communism
- World communism
- Left-Wing Accelerationism

=== Opposition ===
- Anti-communism
  - McCarthyism
  - Pinochetism
- Anti-Marxism
- Anti-socialism

=== Religious variants ===
- Christian communism
  - Bruderhofs
  - Diggers
  - Hutterites
  - Shakers
- Islamic communism
  - Nasakom
- Jewish communism
- Mazdakism

=== Regional variants ===
==== African ====
- Angola
- Benin
- Congo
- Egypt
- Eritrea
- Ethiopia
- Mozambique
- Somalia
- South Africa
- Tanzania
- Tunisia

==== American ====
- Canada
- Chile
- Colombia
- Cuba
- Grenada
- Peru
  - Shining Path
- United States

==== Asian ====
- Afghanistan
- Armenia
- Azerbaijan
- Cambodia
  - Khmer Rouge
  - Salvation Front
- China
  - New Left
  - Ultra-left
- India
  - Keralan communism
  - Naxalism
  - Tripuran communism
  - West Bengali communism
- Georgia
- Indonesia
  - Sumatra
- Iran
- Israel
- Japan
  - New Left
- Kazakhstan
- Korea
  - North Korea
  - South Korea
- Kurdistan
- Kyrgyzstan
- Laos
- Mongolia
- Nepal
- Palestine
- Pakistan
- Philippines
- Soviet Union
- Tajikistan
- Thailand
- Turkey
- Turkmenistan
- Uzbekistan
- Vietnam
  - Trotskyism
- Yemen
  - South Yemen

==== European ====
- Albania
- Bosnia, and Herzegovina
- Bulgaria
- Belarus
- Croatia
- Cyprus
- Czechoslovakia
  - Bohemia and Moravia
  - Slovakia
- Estonia
- Finland
  - Taistoism
- France
- Germany
  - East Germany
  - West Germany
- Greece
- Hungary
- Italy
- Latvia
- Lithuania
- Macedonia
- Moldova
- Montenegro
- Poland
- Portugal
- Romania
  - National communism
- Russia
  - Mensheviks
  - Bolshevism
    - Bolsheviks
      - Centre
        - Kamenevism
        - Stalinism
        - Zinovievism
      - Left Opposition
        - Left communism
        - Group of Democratic Centralism
        - Left–Right Bloc
        - Trotskyism
        - United Opposition
        - Workers' Opposition
          - Workers Group of the Russian Communist Party
          - Workers' Truth
      - Old Bolsheviks
        - Recallists
        - Ultimatists
      - Right Opposition
        - Anti-Party Group
        - Bukharinism
        - Noginism
        - Rykovism
        - Tomskyism
        - Gang of Eight
        - Left–Right Bloc
        - Soyuz
        - Union of Marxist–Leninists
- Serbia
- Slovenia
- Spain
- Ukraine
- United Kingdom
  - Trotskyism
    - Neo-Trotskyism
- Yugoslavia

==== Oceanian ====
- Australia
- New Zealand

== Conservatism ==
Political internationals

- International Democrat Union (conservatism)
- International Monarchist League (monarchism)

=== General ===
- Anti-unionism
- Authoritarian conservatism
- Bioconservatism
- Black conservatism
- Civic conservatism
- Classical conservatism
  - Distributism
- Conservative corporatism
- Conservative liberalism
- Cultural conservatism
- Fiscal conservatism
- Green conservatism
- Left-conservatism
- Liberal conservatism
- Libertarian conservatism
  - Fusionism
  - Libertarian Republicanism
  - Paleolibertarianism
  - Western conservatism
- LGBT conservatism
- National conservatism
  - Anti-immigrationism
  - Ethnic nationalism
  - Nativism
- Neoconservatism
- Paleoconservatism
  - Paleolibertarianism
- Paternalistic conservatism
  - Compassionate conservatism
  - Conservative socialism
  - Progressive conservatism
- Right-wing populism
- Social conservatism
  - Anti-abortion movement
  - Anti-feminism
  - Anti-LGBT movement
- Social Darwinism
  - Kraterocracy
- Theoconservatism
  - Christian right
  - State religion
    - Antidisestablishmentarianism
    - Caesaropapism
    - Dominionism
    - Hierocracy
    - Theocracy
    - Theonomy
  - Ultramontanism
- Traditionalist conservatism

=== Reactionary ===
- Absolutism
  - Autocracy
- Alt-lite movement
- Alt-right movement
- Authoritarian capitalism
- Illiberalism
  - Guided democracy
  - Inverted totalitarianism
- Imperialism
  - Colonialism
- Integralism
- Irredentism
- Monarchism
  - Absolute monarchism
    - Enlightened absolutism
      - Josephinism
    - Patriarchalism
  - Constitutional monarchism
    - Crowned republic
- Neo-feudalism
- Neo-nationalism
- Neo-reactionary movement
- Oligarchy
  - Aristocracy
  - Plutocracy
    - Timocracy
- Reactionary modernism
- Reactionary populism
- Revanchism
- Theocracy
- White supremacy
  - Segregationism

=== Opposition ===
- Anti anti-communism
- Anti-establishmentarianism
- Anti-monarchism
- Cultural liberalism
- Cultural radicalism
- Radicalism
- Postmodernism
- Progressivism

=== Religious variants ===
- Christian right
  - Christian fundamentalism
  - Traditionalist Catholicism
    - Radical traditional Catholicism
- Hindu fundamentalism
  - Hindutva
- Islamism
  - Islamic fundamentalism
- Jewish Conservatism
  - Religious Zionism

=== Regional variants ===
==== African ====
- Egypt
- Gabon
- Ghana
- Ivory Coast
- Kenya
- Liberia
- Malawi
- Morocco
- Niger
- Nigeria
- South Africa
  - Apartheid
- Sudan
- Uganda

==== American ====
- Latin America
  - Brazil
    - Bolsonarism
    - Modern conservatism
    - Monarchism
    - Nativism
  - Colombia
  - Peru
    - Fujimorism
  - Puerto Rico
  - Pinochetism
- North America
  - Canada
    - Bernierism
    - Blue Toryism
    - Monarchism
    - Nativism
    - Pink Toryism
    - Red Toryism
    - Trumpism

===== United States =====
- Black conservatism
- Conservative coalition
- Conservative democratism
  - Anti-abolitionism
  - Bourbon Democrat
  - Jacksonianism
  - Southern democratism
    - Confederatism
      - Neo-confederatism
    - Dixiecratism
      - Segregationism
      - Southern nationalism
- Federalism
  - Classical conservatism
  - New Federalism
- McCarthyism
- Nativism
  - Know Nothing movement
- New Right
- Old Right
  - Paleoconservatism
  - Paleolibertarianism
- Republicanism
  - Conservative republicanism
  - Libertarian republicanism
  - Moderate republicanism
    - Main Street republicanism
      - Republican Main Street Partnership
    - Tuesday Group
  - Modern conservatism
  - Movement conservatism
  - Reaganism
    - Reagan Doctrine
    - Reaganomics
  - Stalwarts
  - Tea Party movement
    - Freedom Caucus
  - Trumpism
    - Christian Trumpism
    - QAnon

==== Asian ====
- China
- Hong Kong
  - Localism
  - Nativism
- India
  - Modern conservatism
    - Modrism
- Japan
  - Abeism
  - Monarchism
  - Neoconservatism
- Pakistan
  - Nativism
- South Korea
  - Modern conservatism
- Taiwan
  - Nativism
- Turkey
  - Conservative democracy
    - Erdoganism

==== European ====
- Ancient Rome
- Belgium
- Denmark
- Finland
- France
  - Bonapartism
    - Neo-Bonapartism
  - Gaullism
  - LePenism
  - Monarchism
    - Legitimism
    - Orléanism
    - Ultra-royalism
  - Nouvelle Droite
  - Revolutionary France
    - Ancien Régime
    - Chouannerie
    - Historical Right
    - Thermidorians
- Germany
  - Bismarkianism
    - Conservative socialism
    - State socialism
  - Conservative revolutionary movement
    - Prussian socialism
  - Monarchism
  - Neue Rechte
  - Prussianism
  - Reichsbürger movement
- Greece
- Hungary
  - Orbanism
- Iceland
- Conservatism in Italy
  - Historical Right
  - Modern conservatism
    - Berlusconism
  - Liberal conservatism
  - Sanfedismo
- Luxembourg
- Poland
  - Golden Liberty
    - Sarmatism
  - Modern conservatism
- Norway
- Russia
  - Monarchism
    - Octobrism
  - Modern conservatism
    - Putinism
      - Chekism
        - Nashism
      - Eurasianism
      - Neo-Sovietism
        - Neo-Stalinism
- Serbia
- Spain
  - Falangism
  - Francoism
  - Integrism
  - Monarchism
    - Carlism
      - Hugism
  - Neocatholicism
- Sweden
- Switzerland
- Ukraine
- United Kingdom
  - Butskellism
  - Cavaliers
    - Tories
      - New Tories
  - Jacobitism
  - Monarchism
  - Nativism
  - Neoconservatism
  - One-nation conservatism
    - Cameronism
      - Big Society
      - Muscular liberalism
    - Johnsonism
  - Thatcherism
    - Blatcherism
  - Toryism
    - High Toryism
      - Johnsonism
      - Powellism
    - Tory anarchism
    - Tory democracy
      - Tory socialism
    - Ultra-Toryism

==== Oceanian ====
- Australia
  - Monarchism
  - Modern conservatism
  - Nativism
- Fiji
- New Zealand
- Papua New Guinea
- Samoa
- Tonga
- Vanuatu

== Corporatism ==
=== General ===
- Communitarian corporatism
- Conservative corporatism
- Economic corporatism
- Fascist corporatism
- Kinship corporatism
- Liberal corporatism
- National corporatism
- Neo-corporatism
  - Tripartism
- Social corporatism
  - Nordic model
- Solidar corporatism
- State corporatism

=== Other ===
- Christian democracy
- Class collaborationism
- Consociationalism
- Cooperativism
- Corporate feudalism
- Corporate statism
- Corporate welfarism
- Guild socialism
- Guildism
- Managerialism
- Mutualist movement
- National syndicalism
- Neo-feudalism

=== Religious variants ===
- Christian corporatism
  - Distributism

=== Regional variants ===
- Chile
- China
- Nordic countries
- Russia
- Western Europe

==== Western Europe ====
- Austria
- Belgium
- France
  - National syndicalism
  - Yellow socialism
- Germany
  - Bismarkianism
    - Conservative socialism
    - State socialism
  - Conservative revolutionary movement
    - Fascist corporatism
    - Prussian socialism
  - Ordoliberalism
    - Rhine model
- Ireland
- Italy
  - Christian democratic corporatism
    - Consociationalism
  - Fascist corporatism
  - National syndicalism
- Luxembourg
- Portugal
  - National syndicalism
- Netherlands
- Spain
  - Fascist corporatism
  - National syndicalism
- Switzerland

== Democracy ==
Symbol of Democracy(1)

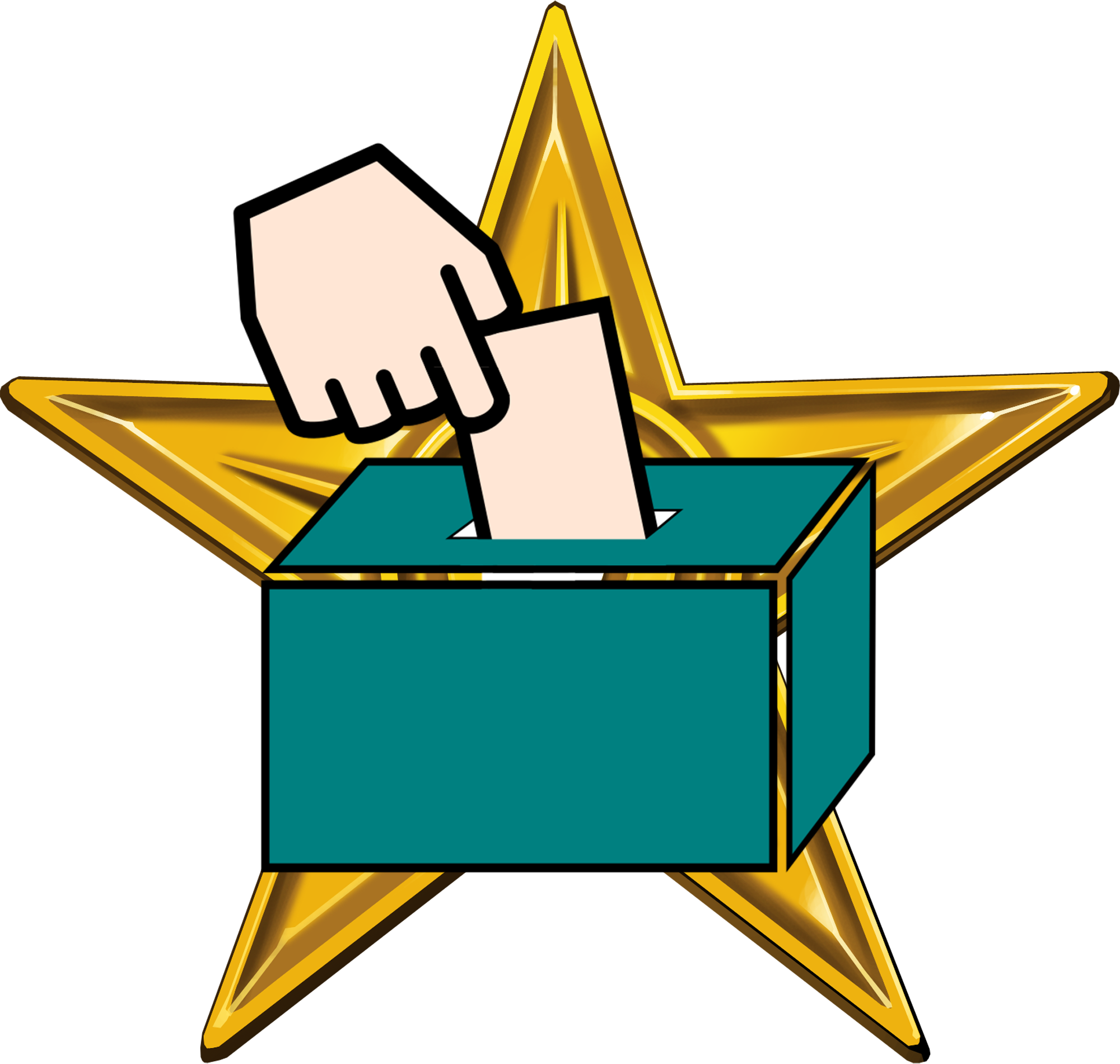
Symbol of Democracy(2)

=== General ===
- Associative democracy
- Bioregional democracy
- Bourgeois democracy
- Cellular democracy
- Conservative democracy
- Constitutional democracy
- Cosmopolitan democracy
- Defensive democracy
- Economic democracy
- E-democracy
  - Collaborative e-democracy
  - E-government
  - E-participation
  - Interactive democracy
- Ethnic democracy
  - Herrenvolk democracy
- Guided democracy
- Liquid democracy
- Market democracy
- Media democracy
- Multiparty democracy
- Non-partisan democracy
- Participatory democracy
- Pluralist democracy
- Procedural democracy
- Proletarian democracy
- Racial democracy
- Radical democracy
- Representative democracy
  - Council democracy
  - Electoral democracy
  - Ethnocracy
  - Liberal democracy
    - Illiberal democracy
  - Parliamentary democracy
    - Westminster democracy
  - Presidential democracy
  - Totalitarian democracy
- Republican democracy
- Revolutionary democracy
- Sectarian democracy
- Semi-democracy
- Semi-direct democracy
- Social democracy
- Socialist democracy
  - Economic democracy
    - Council democracy
    - Inclusive democracy
    - Industrial democracy
    - Soviet democracy
    - Workplace democracy
  - Marxist democracy
  - Marxist–Leninist democracy
    - New Democracy
    - People's democracy
      - People's dictatorship democracy
      - Whole-process people's democracy
- Sovereign democracy
- Substantive democracy
- Tory democracy

=== Other ===
- Demarchism
- Democratic capitalism
- Democratic centralism
- Democratic confederalism
- Democratic globalization
  - Democratic mundialization
- Democratic republicanism
- Democratic socialism
- Democratic transhumanism
- Majoritarianism
- Producerism
- Sortitionism

=== Direct democracy movements ===
- Anticipatory democracy
- Anti-corruption movements
- Anti-establishmentarianism
- Anti-particracy movements
- Cellular democracy
- Collaborative governance
- Consensus democracy
- Copyright reform movements
- Council democracy
- Cyber-utopianism
- Deliberative democracy
- Delegative democracy
- Dynamic governance
- E-democracy
- Economic democracy
- Empowered democracy
- Grassroots democracy
- Inclusive Democracy
- Localism
- Marxist democracy
- Net neutrality movements
- Open-source governance
- Pirate politics
- Popular democracy
- Producerism
- Semi-direct democracy

=== Pirate politics ===
Political internationals

- Pirate Parties International (pirate politics)
- Anti-copyright movement
  - Copyleft movement
  - Copyright abolitionism
  - Free-culture movement
- Anti-corruption movement
- Civil rights movement
- Civil libertarianism
- Direct democracy
  - Economic democracy
  - E-democracy
  - Participatory democracy
- Free speech movement
- Information privacy movement
- Net neutrality movement
- Free and open-source software
  - Free software movement
  - Open-source-software movement

=== Opposition ===
- Anti-democratism

=== Religious variants ===
==== Christian democracy ====
Political internationals

- Centrist Democrat International (Christian democracy)
- Christian Democrat Organization of America (Christian democracy)

===== General =====
- Distributism
  - Social credit movement
- Gremialismo
- Popularism

===== Other =====
- Christian corporatism
- Christian democratic welfarism
- Christian egalitarianism
- Communitarianism
- Ordoliberalism
- Progressive conservatism
- Social conservatism

==== Other ====
- Christian democracy
- Islamic democracy
- Jewish democracy
- Theodemocracy

=== Regional variants ===
==== African ====
- Egypt
- Morocco

==== Asian ====
- Bangladesh
- China
  - Hong Kong
- India
- Nepal
- Iran
- Israel
- Lebanon
- Pakistan
- Palestine
- Rojava
- Singapore
- Vietnam

==== American ====
- Chile
- Chiapas
- United States
  - Direct democracy
  - Jacksonian democracy
  - Jeffersonian democracy

==== European ====
- Ancient Greece
  - Athenian democracy
  - Spartan democracy
- Ancient Rome
- Belarus
- France
  - Paris Commune
- Poland
  - Soviet democracy
- Switzerland
- United Kingdom

==== Oceanian ====
- Australia

== Environmentalism ==
Political internationals

- Friends of the Earth (environmentalism)
- Global Greens (green politics)
- World Ecological Parties (bright green environmentalism)

=== Bright green environmentalism ===
- Car-free movement
- Climate movement
- Conservation movement
- Eco-modernism
  - Ecological modernization
  - Prometheanism
  - Technogaianism
- Positive environmentalism

=== Deep green environmentalism ===
- Anti-consumerism
  - Degrowth movement
  - Post-growth
  - Post-consumerism
  - Steady-state economy
- Anti-globalization movement
  - Alter-globalization movement
  - Global justice movement
- Anti-nuclear movement
- Bioregionalism
- Ecoauthoritarianism
- Ecocentrism
- Eco-fascism
- Green anarchism
  - Anarcho-naturism
  - Anarcho-primitivism
    - Rewilding
  - Communalism
    - Eco-communalism
      - Back-to-the-land movement
    - Democratic confederalism
    - Green municipalism
    - Libertarian municipalism
    - Social ecology
  - Inclusive democracy
- Neo-Luddism
- Radical environmentalism
  - Animal rights movement
  - Deep Green Resistance
  - Earth liberation movement

=== Light green environmentalism ===
- Free-market environmentalism
  - Eco-capitalism
    - Sustainable capitalism
  - Georgism
    - Geolibertarianism
  - Green libertarianism
- Green conservatism
  - Fiscal environmentalism
- Green liberalism

=== Other ===
- Ecofeminism
- Eco-nationalism
  - Green Zionism
- Green left
  - Eco-socialism
- Localism
- Queer ecology

=== Opposition ===
- Anti-environmentalism
- Wise use movement

=== Religious variants ===
- Christian environmentalism
  - Eco-theology
  - Evangelical environmentalism
- Islamic environmentalism
- Jewish environmentalism
- Maori environmentalism
- Spiritual ecology

=== Regional variants ===
==== African ====
- South Africa

==== American ====
- United States

==== Asian ====
- Bangladesh
- China
- India
- Israel
- South Korea
- Taiwan

==== European ====
- Switzerland

==== Oceanian ====
- Australia
- New Zealand

== Fascism ==
Political internationals

- World Union of National Socialists (Nazism)

=== General ===
- Classical fascism
- Crypto-fascism
- Eco-fascism
- Neo-fascism
- Para-fascism
- Post-fascism
- Proto-fascism
- Techno-fascism

=== Other ===
- Alt-right movement
  - Groypers
- Aryanism
- Conservative revolutionary movement
- Corporate statism
- Fascist corporatism
- Fascist mysticism
- Esoteric fascism
- Fascist syndicalism
- Feudal fascism
- Nazism
- Neo-Nazism
- Nouvelle Droite
- Palingenetic ultranationalism
- Racial nationalism
- Supremacism
- Syncretism
- Third Position
- Ultranationalism
- Metaxism
- Right-Wing Accelerationism

=== Opposition ===
- Anti-authoritarianism
- Anti-imperialism
- Anti-militarism
- Anti-nationalism
- Anti-racism

==== By country ====
- During and before World War II
  - Albania
  - Austria
  - Belgium
  - Bulgaria
  - Burma
  - China
  - Czech Republic
  - Denmark
  - France
    - Francs-Tireurs et Partisans
  - Germany
    - Antifaschistische Aktion
    - Iron Front
  - Greece
  - Hungary
  - Italy
    - Arditi del Popolo
  - Japan
  - Lithuania
  - Malaysia
  - Moldova
  - Netherlands
  - Norway
  - Partisan resistance movement (multinational)
    - Jewish partisans
  - Philippines
  - Poland
    - Anti-Fascist Bloc
    - Jewish Combat Organization
  - Portugal
  - Slovakia
  - Soviet Union
  - Spain
  - Thailand
  - Yugoslavia
- Post-World War II
  - Austria
  - Burma
  - Germany
    - Denazification
  - Sweden
  - United Kingdom
    - Anti-Fascist Action
    - Anti-Nazi League
    - Movement for Justice
    - Red Action
    - Squadism
    - Unite Against Fascism
  - United States
    - Anti-Racist Action
    - By Any Means Necessary
    - Redneck Revolt
    - Refuse Fascism
    - Skinheads Against Racial Prejudice

=== Religious variants ===
- Christian nationalism
  - Christofascism
    - Christian Identity
    - Falangism
    - Positive Christianity
- Clerical fascism
- Esoteric Nazism
  - Ariosophy
- Hindutva
- Islamofascism
- Neo-Zionism
  - Kahanism
- Revisionist Zionism
- State Shinto

=== Regional variants ===
==== African ====
- Rwanda
- South Africa
  - Afrikaner Weerstandsbeweging
  - Blanke Bevrydingsbeweging
- Togo
- Zaire

==== American ====
- Latin America
  - Argentina
    - Nacionalismo
  - Bolivia
    - Neo-fascism
  - Brazil
    - Bolsonarism
    - Integralism
    - Nazism
      - Neo-Nazism
  - Chile
    - Nazism
      - Neo-Nazism
    - Pinochetism
  - Costa Rica
  - Mexico
    - Mexican synarchism
  - Peru
    - Ethnocacerism
- North America
  - Canada
    - Nazism
      - Neo-Nazism
  - United States
    - Nazism
      - Neo-Nazism
    - Neo-fascism
      - Anarcho-fascism
    - Trumpism

==== Asian ====
- East Asian
  - China
  - Indonesia
  - Japan
    - Techno-fascism
  - Mongolia
    - Neo-Nazism
  - Taiwan
    - Neo-Nazism
- South Asian
  - Hindutva
- West Asian
  - Arab fascism
  - Iran
    - Neo-Nazism
  - Israel
    - Neo-Nazism
    - Neo-Zionism
      - Kahanism
    - Revisionist Zionism
  - Lebanon
  - Syria
  - Turkey
    - Neo-Nazism

==== European ====
- Albania
  - Nazism
- Austria
  - Nazism
- Belgium
  - Neo-Nazism
- Bosnia and Herzegovina
- Bulgaria
- Belarus
- Croatia
  - Frankism
  - Ustasism
  - Neo-fascism
  - Neo-Nazism
- Czech Republic
- Czechoslovakia
  - Nástupism
- Denmark
  - Neo-Nazism
- Estonia
  - Neo-Nazism
- France
  - Nazism
    - Neo-Nazism
  - Neo-socialism
  - Révolution nationale (Pétainism / Vichyism)
    - Neo-Pétainism
- Germany
  - Nazi Germany
    - Hitlerism
    - Strasserism
  - Neo-Nazism
  - Völkisch movement
- Greece
  - Nazism
    - Neo-Nazism
      - Golden Dawn
  - Neo-fascism
- Hungary
  - Nazism
    - Neo-Nazism
- Italy
  - Classical fascism
    - Actual idealism
    - Fasci movement
    - Futurism
    - Mussolinism
    - Republican fascism
    - Revolutionary fascism
    - Sansepolcrismo
  - Nazism
    - Nazi-Maoism
    - Neo-Nazism
  - Neo-fascism
    - Italian Social Movement
  - Post-fascism
- Latvia
- Lithuania
- Netherlands
  - Nazism
  - Neo-Nazism
- Norway
- Poland
  - National radicalism
- Portugal
- Romania
  - Nazism
  - Antonism
- Russia
  - Ruscism
  - Nazism
    - Neo-Nazism
- Serbia
- Slovakia
  - Neo-fascism
  - Neo-Nazism
- Slovenia
  - Neo-Nazism
- Spain
  - Francoism
- Sweden
  - Neo-Nazism
- Switzerland
- Ukraine
  - Banderism
  - Neo-Nazism
- United Kingdom
  - Neo-fascism
- Yugoslavia

==== Oceanian ====
- Australia
- New Zealand
  - Neo-Nazism

== Identity politics ==
Political internationals

- International Council of Women (feminism)
- Minority Rights Group International (minority rights)
- Unrepresented Nations and Peoples Organization (indigenous rights and self-determination)

=== Age-related rights movements ===
- Anti-abortion movement
- Children's rights movement
- Elder rights movement
- Intergenerational equity
- Youth rights movement

=== Animal-related rights movements ===
- Abolitionism
- Animal egalitarianism
  - Anti-specism
- Animal protectionism
- Animal rights movement
- Animal liberation movement
- Animal welfarism
  - Anti-naturalism

=== Disability-related rights movements ===
- Disability rights movement
  - Deaf rights movement
  - Neurodiversity movement
    - Autism rights movement
    - Mad pride movement
    - Psychiatric survivors movement
      - Anti-psychiatry
- Fat acceptance movement
  - Fat feminism

=== Feminism ===
==== General ====
- Analytical feminism
- Anarcha-feminism
- Care-focused feminism
- Conservative feminism
- Cultural feminism
- Cyberfeminism
- Difference feminism
- Eco-feminism
  - Vegetarian eco-feminism
- Equality feminism
- Gender feminism
- Gender-critical feminism
- Individualist feminism
- Intersectional feminism
- Labor feminism
- Lesbian feminism
- Liberal feminism
  - Equity feminism
- Libertarian feminism
- Lipstick feminism
  - Neo-feminism
- Material feminism
- Maternal feminism
- Post-modern feminism
- Pro-feminism
- Radical feminism
  - Trans-exclusionary radical feminism
  - Women's liberation movement
- Separatist feminism
- Sex-positive feminism
- Social feminism
- Socialist feminism
  - Marxist feminism
- Standpoint feminism
- State feminism
- Transfeminism

==== Opposition ====
- Antifeminism

==== Chronological variants ====
- Proto-feminism
- First-wave feminism
- Second-wave feminism
- Third-wave feminism
- Fourth-wave feminism
- Post-feminism

==== Ethnic and social variants ====
- Black feminism
  - Hip-hop feminism
  - Womanism
    - Africana womanism
- Chicana feminism
- Dalit feminism
- French feminism
  - Post-structural feminism
- Indigenous feminism
  - Native American feminism
- Kurdish feminism
- Post-colonial feminism
  - Global feminism
  - Third-world feminism
  - Transnational feminism
- White feminism

==== Religious variants ====
- Atheist feminism
- Buddhist feminism
- Christian feminism
  - New feminism
- Hindu feminism
- Islamic feminism
- Jewish feminism
  - Orthodox Jewish feminism
- Mormon feminism
- Neopagan feminism
  - Dianic Wicca
  - Reclaiming
- Sikh feminism

==== Regional variants ====
===== African =====
- Congo
- Egypt
- Ethiopia
- Ghana
- Mali
- Nigeria
- South Africa

===== American =====
- Latin America
  - Argentina
  - Brazil
  - Chile
  - Haiti
  - Honduras
  - Mexico
  - Paraguay
  - Trinidad and Tobago
- North America
  - Canada
  - United States

===== Asian =====
- Bangladesh
- China
- Hong Kong
- India
- Indonesia
- Iran
- Iraq
- Israel
- Japan
- Lebanon
- Malaysia
- Nepal
- Northern Cyprus
- Pakistan
- Philippines
- South Korea
- Syria
- Taiwan
- Thailand
- Turkey
- Vietnam

===== European =====
- Albania
- Denmark
- Finland
- France
- Germany
- Greece
- Ireland
- Italy
- Netherlands
- Norway
- Poland
- Russia
- Sweden
- Ukraine
- United Kingdom

===== Oceanian =====
- Australia
- New Zealand

=== LGBTQ social movements ===
- Gay liberation
- Homonationalism
- LGBT conservatism
- LGBTQ pride
- LGBTQ rights opposition
- Pink capitalism
- Queer anarchism
- Queer radicalism
- Queer ecology
- Queer nationalism
- Socialism and LGBTQ rights
- Transfeminism

=== Men's movement ===
- Anti-feminism
- Fathers' rights movement
- Intactivism
- Masculism
- Meninism
- Men's rights movement
- Mythopoetic men's movement
- Patriarchy
- Pro-feminism
  - Men's liberation movement

==== Regional variants ====
- Australia
- India
- Italy
- United Kingdom
- United States

=== Self-determination movements ===
==== African-American ====
- African-American self-determination movement
- Black anarchism
- Black capitalism
  - Black conservatism
- Black feminism
  - Womanism
    - Africana womanism
- Black power
- Pan-Africanism

==== Indigenous peoples ====
- First Nations self-determination movement
- Greenlandic independence movement
- Indigenous Australian self-determination movement
- Indigenous self-determination movement
- Māori self-determination movement
- Native American self-determination movement
  - American Indian Movement
- Pan-Indianism

==== Latin American ====
- Chicanism
  - Chicano movement
- Hispanicism
- Indigenism
  - Katarism
  - Mexico
  - Peru
- Pan-Americanism
- Pan-Hispanism

=== Separatist and supremacist movements ===
==== Ethnic ====
- Afrocentrism
- Anglo-Saxonism
- Apartheidism
- Arab supremacism
- Auto-segregationism
- Eurocentrism
- Indocentrism
- Institutional racism
- Manifest destiny
- Nordicism
- Racialism
- Racial supremacism
- Racism
- Scientific racism
- Secessionism
- Sinocentrism

===== Black =====
- Black nationalism
  - Garveyism
- Black separatism
- Black supremacism
- Black Feminism

===== White =====
- White nationalism
- White separatism
- White supremacism
- White feminism

===== Regional variants =====
====== African ======
- South Africa

====== American ======
- Latin America
  - Racial segregationism
- North America
  - Canada
    - Racial segregationism
      - Greater Vancouver
  - United States
    - Racial segregationism
      - Atlanta segregationism
      - Auto-segregationism
      - Church segregationism
      - Public house segregationism
      - Residential segregationism
      - School segregationism
        - Academic segregationism
        - Black school segregationism
      - United States Armed Forces
    - White nationalism
    - White supremacism

====== Asian ======
- Pakistan

====== European ======
- Belgium
- Bosnia, and Herzegovina
- Georgia
  - Separatism in Chechnya
  - Separatism in Dagestan
  - Separatism in Tatarstan
  - Separatism in Ural
- Serbia
- Spain
  - Basque separatism
  - Catalan separatism
- Ukraine
- United Kingdom

====== Oceania ======
- Australia
  - Tasmania

==== Gender ====
- Feminist separatism
  - Lesbian separatism
- Homonationalism
- Matriarchy
- Patriarchy

==== Religious variants ====
- Fundamentalism
  - Buddhist fundamentalism
  - Christian fundamentalism
    - Catholic fundamentalism
    - Protestant fundamentalism
  - Hindu fundamentalism
  - Islamic fundamentalism
  - Jewish fundamentalism
  - Pagan fundamentalism

=== Student movements ===
==== General ====
- Anarchist free school movement
- Student activism

==== Regional variants ====
- Argentina
- Australia
- Bangladesh
- Canada
- Chile
- China
- Congo
- Eastern Europe
  - Albania
  - Belarus
  - Czechoslovakia
  - Georgia
  - Hungary
  - Kyrgyzstan
  - Serbia
  - Ukraine
- European Union
  - France
  - Germany
  - United Kingdom
- Hong Kong
  - Umbrella Revolution
  - Hong Kong Federation of Students
  - Occupy Tamar
  - Scholarism
  - Umbrella Movement
- India
  - Assam Movement
  - Pro-jallikattu movement
- Indonesia
- Iran
- Israel
- Japan
- Korea
- Malaysia
- Mexico
- Philippines
- Taiwan
  - Anti-Black Box Curriculum Movement
  - Sunflower Student Movement
- Uganda
- United States
  - New Students for a Democratic Society
  - Rouge Forum
  - Students for a Democratic Society
    - Worker Student Alliance
  - Student Press Law Center

== Liberalism ==
Political internationals

- Liberal International (liberalism)
- Transnational Radical Party (radicalism)

=== General ===
- Agonistic liberalism
- Classical liberalism
- Conservative liberalism
- Constitutional liberalism
- Cultural liberalism
- Economic liberalism
- Green liberalism
- Muscular liberalism
- National liberalism
- Neoclassical liberalism
- Neoliberalism
- Ordoliberalism
- Secular liberalism
- Social liberalism
- Technoliberalism

=== Other ===
- Anti anti-communism
- Liberal centrism
  - Liberal communitarianism
  - Liberal moderatism
  - Liberal syncretism
  - Radical centrism
  - Sinistrisme
  - Third Way
  - Trasformismo
- Liberal constitutionalism
- Liberal egalitarianism
  - Modern egalitarianism
  - Political egalitarianism
- Liberal autocracy
- Liberal conservatism
- Liberal corporatism
- Liberal democracy
- Liberal feminism
  - Equity feminism
- Liberal internationalism
  - Cosmopolitanism
  - Globalism
    - Cultural globalizationism
    - Economic globalizationism
    - Political globalizationism
- Liberal progressivism
- Liberal socialism
  - Ethical socialism
- Liberal transhumanism
- Liberal welfarism
- Liberal radicalism
- Liberal republicanism
  - Classical republicanism
  - Democratic republicanism
  - Legal egalitarianism
  - Modern republicanism
  - Neo-republicanism
- Social libertarianism
- Whiggism

=== Opposition ===
- Anti-liberalism
- Illiberal democracy

=== Regional variants ===
==== African ====
- Egypt
- Nigeria
- Senegal
- South Africa
- Tunisia
- Zimbabwe

==== American ====
- Latin America
  - Bolivia
  - Brazil
  - Chile
  - Colombia
  - Cuba
  - Ecuador
  - Honduras
  - Mexico
  - Nicaragua
  - Panama
  - Paraguay
  - Peru
  - Puerto Rico
    - Artiguism
    - Batllism
  - Venezuela
- North America
  - Canada
  - United States
    - Abolitionism
    - Anti-Federalism
      - Anti-Administration party
      - Democratic republicanism
        - Jacobinism
        - Jeffersonianism
    - Democratism
      - New democratism
        - Clintonism
    - Liberal republicanism
      - Moderate republicanism
      - Radical republicanism
    - Modern liberalism
      - Classical liberalism
      - New Deal liberalism
        - New Deal coalition
      - Progressive movement
      - Wilsonianism

==== Asian ====
- China
- Hong Kong
- India
- Iran
- Israel
- Japan
- Philippines
- South Korea
- Taiwan
- Thailand
- Turkey
  - Liberal Kemalism

==== European ====
- Albania
- Armenia
- Austria
  - Jacobinism
- Belgium
- Bulgaria
- Croatia
- Cyprus
- Czech lands
- Denmark
- Estonia
- Finland
- France
  - Abolitionism
    - Society of the Friends of the Blacks
  - Republican Left
  - Revolutionary France
    - Historical Left
      - Jacobins
        - Cordeliers
        - Dantonists
        - Girondins
        - Hébertists
        - Montagnards
    - Modérantisme
      - Feuillants Club
      - Maraisards
        - Thermidorians
      - Monarchiens
      - Society of 1789
- Germany
- Greece
- Hungary
- Italy
  - Historical Left
  - Historical Right
- Latvia
- Lithuania
- Luxembourg
- Macedonia
- Moldova
- Montenegro
- Netherlands
- Norway
- Poland
- Portugal
- Romania
- Russia
- Serbia
- Slovakia
- Slovenia
- Spain
  - Krausism
- Sweden
- Switzerland
- Ukraine
- United Kingdom
  - Abolitionism
  - Gladstonian liberalism
  - Manchester Liberalism
    - Cobdenism
  - Muscular liberalism
  - New liberalism
  - Radicalism
    - Chartism
    - Foxites
    - Jacobinism
    - Philosophical Radicalism
  - Roundheads
    - Cromwellism
    - Whigs
  - Spencerianism

==== Oceanian ====
- Australia
- New Zealand

== Libertarianism ==
Political internationals

- Center for a Stateless Society (left-libertarianism)
- International Alliance of Libertarian Parties (right-libertarianism)
- International of Anarchist Federations (anarchism)
- International Union for Land Value Taxation (Georgism)
- Liberty International (right-libertarianism)

=== Left-libertarianism ===
- Classical liberal radicalism
- Eco-socialism
- Free-market anarchism
- Free-market anti-capitalism
  - Agorism
  - Counter-economics
  - Free-market socialism
  - Left-wing laissez-faire
  - Market-oriented left-libertarianism
  - Really Really Free Market movement
- Geolibertarianism
- Green anarchism
- Individualist anarchism
- Libertarian communism
- Libertarian Marxism
- Libertarian socialism
- Mutualism
- Social anarchism
- Social libertarianism
- Steiner–Vallentyne school

=== Right-libertarianism ===
- Anarcho-capitalism
  - Crypto-anarchism
- Austro-libertarianism
- Chicagoanism
- Conservative libertarianism
- Fiscal conservatism
- Free-marketism
  - Free-market fundamentalism
  - Right-wing laissez-faire
- Fusionism
- Neo-liberalism
- Paleolibertarianism
- Propertarianism

=== Other ===
- Autarchism
- Civil libertarianism
- Consequentialist libertarianism
- Constitutionalism
- Laissez-faire
- Libertarian conservatism
- Libertarian feminism
- Libertarian paternalism
- Minarchism
- Natural-rights libertarianism
- Neoclassical liberalism
- Panarchism
- Radicalism
- Technolibertarianism
  - Libertarian transhumanism
    - Anarcho-transhumanism
  - Californian Ideology
  - Techno-utopianism
- Voluntaryism

=== Opposition ===
- Anti-libertarianism

=== Religious variants ===
- Christian libertarianism
- Libertarian Christianity

=== Regional variants ===
==== African ====
- South Africa
  - Anarchism

==== American ====
- Argentina
- Canada
  - Anarchism
- United States

===== United States =====
- Anarcho-capitalism
  - Freedmanian anarcho-capitalism
  - Rothbardian anarcho-capitalism
    - Hoppean anarcho-capitalism
- Anarcho-communism
- Anarcho-syndicalism
  - Wobblyism
- Crypto-anarchism
- Egoist anarchism
- Free-market anti-capitalism
  - Free-market anarchism
    - Agorism
    - Free-market socialism
      - Laissez-faire socialism
      - Mutualism
      - Neo-mutualism
    - Market-oriented left-libertarianism
      - Left-wing laissez-faire
        - Laissez-faire socialism
      - Market anarchism
- Green anarchism
- Individualist anarchism
- Libertarian democratism
  - Bleeding-heart libertarianism
- Libertarian republicanism
  - Conservative libertarianism
    - Reaganism
- Right-wing laissez-faire
  - Laissez-faire capitalism
  - Raw capitalism
- Social anarchism

==== Asian ====
- Hong Kong

==== European ====
- United Kingdom
  - Anarchism
    - Anarcho-communism
    - Anarcho-naturism
    - Individualist anarchism
  - Thatcherism

==== Oceanian ====
- Australia
  - Anarchism
    - Anarcho-technocracy

== Nationalism ==
Political internationals

- International Conference of Asian Political Parties (pan-Asianism and regionalism)
- The Movement (neo-nationalism and right-wing populism)
- Unrepresented Nations and Peoples Organization (nationalism and self-determination)

=== General ===
- Blind nationalism
- Bourgeois nationalism
- Civic nationalism
- Cultural nationalism
- Diaspora nationalism
- Eco-nationalism
- Economic nationalism
  - Business nationalism
  - Corporate nationalism
  - Developmentalism
  - Protectionism
- Ethnic nationalism
  - Identitarianism
- Expansionist nationalism
  - Imperialism
  - Colonialism
  - Irredentism
  - Jingoism
  - Neo-colonialism
  - Neo-imperialism
  - Revanchism
- Homonationalism
- Integral nationalism
  - Brazilian Integralism
  - Lusitanian integralism
  - Maurassisme
  - Revisionist Maximalism
- Left-wing nationalism
  - Ulusalism
- Liberal nationalism
- Liberation nationalism
- Pan-nationalism
- Post-colonial nationalism
- Queer nationalism
- Racial nationalism
- Radical nationalism
- Revolutionary nationalism
- Right-wing nationalism
  - Neo-nationalism
- Romantic nationalism
- Socialist nationalism
  - Socialism in one country
  - Socialist Yugoslav nationalism
    - Yugo-nostalgia
  - Soviet nationalism
    - Neo-Stalinism
    - Neo-Sovietism
    - Soviet nostalgia
- Territorial nationalism
- Ultranationalism

=== Other ===
- Anti-imperialism
  - Isolationism
  - Souverainism
- Chauvinism
  - Fascism
    - Nazism
      - Neo-Nazism
    - Neo-fascism
  - Han chauvinism
  - Local ethnic chauvinism
  - Welfare chauvinism
- Communitarianism
- Dark Enlightenment
- Euroscepticism
  - Hard Euroscepticism
  - Soft Euroscepticism
- Nashism
- National-anarchism
- National Bolshevism
- National capitalism
- National communism
- National conservatism
- National liberalism
- National mysticism
- National populism
- National socialism
- National syndicalism
- Nativism
- Patriotism
- Sovereignism

=== Opposition ===
- Anationalism
- Anti-patriotism
- Anti-Zionism
  - Religious anti-Zionism
- Cosmopolitanism
- Globalism
- Internationalism
  - Cosmopolitan democracy
  - Liberal internationalism
  - Postnationalism
  - Proletarian internationalism
  - Socialist internationalism
- Multiculturalism

=== Religious variants ===
- Pagan nationalism
- Buddhist nationalism
  - 969 Movement
  - Sinhalese Buddhist nationalism
- Christian nationalism
- Hindu nationalism
- Muslim nationalism
- New Confucianism
- Religious Zionism
  - Christian Zionism
- Sikh nationalism
- State Shinto
  - Showa Statism

=== Regional variants ===
==== African ====
- Algeria
- Berber
- East Congo
  - Lumumbism
- Egypt
  - Pharaonism
    - Coptic nationalism
      - Coptic identity
- Ethiopia
- Hutu Power
- Madagascar
- Nigeria
  - Igbo nationalism
- Somalia
- South Africa
  - Afrikaners

==== American ====
- Argentina
- Brazil
- Canada
  - Quebec
- Costa Rica
- Creole nationalism
- Greenland
- Trinidad and Tobago
- United States
  - American exceptionalism
  - Americanism
  - Chicano nationalism
  - Hawaiian sovereignty movement
  - Manifest destiny
  - New Nationalism
  - Puerto Rico independence movement
  - Southern nationalism
    - Confederatism
      - Neo-confederate movement

==== Asian ====
- Arab
  - Lebanon
  - Palestine
- Armenia
- Assyria
- Azerbaijan
- Bangladesh
- Cambodia
- China
  - Cantonese nationalism
  - East Turkistan
  - Taiwan
    - Taiwan independence movement
  - Tibet
- India
  - Assam
    - Bodo nationalism
  - Bengal
  - Dravidian nationalism
    - Kerala
    - Tamil Nadu
  - Indian independence movement
    - Anti-partitionism
      - Composite nationalism
      - Hindu–Muslim unity
    - Two-nation theory
      - Hindu nationalism
      - Muslim nationalism in South Asia
  - Kashmir
    - Khilafat Movement
  - Nagaland
  - Punjab
    - Sikh nationalism
  - Tripura
- Iran
  - Iranian Islamonationalism
- Israel
  - Bundism
  - Canaanism
  - Cultural Zionism
  - Federal Zionism
    - Ethnic federalism
    - Bi-nationalism
  - Green Zionism
  - Golus nationalism
    - Yiddishism
  - Labor Zionism
  - Liberal Zionism
    - Reform Zionism
  - Neo-Zionism
    - Greater Israel
  - Political Zionism
  - Post-Zionism
  - Practical Zionism
  - Revisionist Zionism
    - Revisionist Maximalism
  - Revolutionary Zionism
    - National Bolshevism
  - Synthetic Zionism
  - Zionism
- Japan
- Karen
- Korean
  - Korean ethnic nationalism
- Kurdish
  - Kurdish Islamonationalism
- Malaysia
- Pakistan
  - Kashmir
- Philippines
- Sri Lanka
  - Tamil
- Turkey
  - Kemalism or Atatürk nationalism
  - Neo-Ottomanism
  - Turkish Islamonationalism
- Vietnam
  - Degar

==== European ====
- Albania
  - Kosovo
- Armenia
- Austria
  - German nationalism in Austria
- Belarus
- Bulgaria
- Czechoslovakia
  - Czech Republic
  - Slovakia
- Estonia
- France
  - Alsace
  - Brittany
  - Corsica
  - Gaullism
  - Occitania
  - Souverainism
- Georgia
- Germany
  - Bavaria
  - Prussia
  - New Nationalism
  - Reichsbürger movement
- Golus nationalism
- Greece
  - Cyprus
  - Byzantinism
  - Megali Idea
  - Venizelism
- Hungary
- Ireland
  - Irish republicanism
  - Ulster unionism
- Italy
  - Lombardy
  - Padania
  - Sardinia
  - Sicily
  - Venetian
- Latvia
- Lithuania
- Low Countries
  - Belgium
    - Flanders
    - Orangism
    - Rattachism
    - Wallonia
  - Netherlands
    - Frisia
- Moldova
- Poland
  - National Democracy
  - Polish Messianism
  - Silesia
  - Zadrugism
  - Szeklerland
- Russia
  - Eurasianism
    - Duginism
      - Neo-Eurasianism
  - Extremist nationalism
    - Black Hundreds
  - Nashism
  - Bulgarism
  - Chechnya
  - Circassia
  - Karelia
- Nordic countries
  - Faroe Islands
  - Finland
    - Fennoman movement
    - Svecoman movement
  - Greenland
  - Iceland
  - Norway
  - Sápmi
- Spain
  - Basque
  - Canary Islands
  - Catalonia
  - Galicia
  - Valencia
    - Blaverism
- Ukraine
- United Kingdom
  - British unionism
  - Cornwall
  - England
  - Northern Ireland
    - Ulster loyalism
    - Ulster nationalism
  - Scotland
  - Wales
- Yugoslavia
  - Bosnia
  - Croatia
    - Dalmatia
    - Istria
  - Serbia
  - Macedonia
  - Montenegro
  - Slovenia

==== Oceanian ====
- Australia
- New Zealand
  - Māori
  - South Island

=== Unification movements ===
- Chinese unificationism
  - Han nationalism
- Continentalism
- Eurasianism
- Hui pan-nationalism
- Indian nationalism
  - Anti-partitionism
    - Composite nationalism
    - Hindu–Muslim unity
      - Indian reunificationism
      - Indo-Pakistani Confederationism
- Indigenism
  - Chicanismo
  - Indigenism movement
  - Pan-Indianism
- Korean reunificationism
- Multiculturalism
  - Interculturalism
  - Pluriculturalism
  - Plurinationalism
  - Polyculturalism
- Neo-Sovietism
- Pan-Africanism
- Pan-Albanianism
- Pan-Americanism
- Pan-Arabism
  - Ba'athism
  - Nasserism
    - Neo-Ba'athism
      - Assadism
      - Saddamism
- Pan-Asianism
- Pan-Celticism
- Pan-Dravidianism
- Pan-Europeanism
  - Pro-Europeanism
  - European federalism
    - United States of Europe
  - Pan-European nationalism
- Pan-Finnicism
- Pan-Francoism
  - Rattachism
- Pan-Germanism
  - German reunificationism
- Pan-Hellenism
- Pan-Hispanism
  - Patria Grande
- Pan-Iberism
- Pan-Iranism
- Pan-Irishism
- Pan-Latin Americanism
- Pan-Latinism
- Pan-Mongolism
- Pan-Netherlandism
  - Grootneerlandisme
  - Orangism
- Pan-Oceanianism
- Pan-Rumanianism
  - Moldovan-Romanian reunificationism
- Pan-Scandinavianism
- Pan-Slavism
  - Yugoslavism
- Pan-Somalism
- Pan-Turanism
- Pan-Turkism
- Postnationalism
- Regionalism

== Populism ==
Political internationals

- Foro de São Paulo (democratic socialism, left-wing populism, social democracy and socialism of the 21st century)
- The Movement (neo-nationalism and right-wing populism)
- Progressive International (democratic socialism, left-wing populism, and progressivism)

=== General ===
- Fiscal populism
- Centrist populism
- Conservative populism
- Economic populism
- Liberal populism
- Neopopulism
- Reactionary populism
- Social populism
- Socialist populism
- Techno-populism
- Valence populism

=== Left-wing populism ===
- Agrarian socialism
- Anti-austerity movement
- Anti-consumerism
- Anti-corporate movement
  - Anti-corporate activism
- Anti-globalization movement
  - Left-wing antiglobalism
  - Alter-globalization movement
  - Global citizens movement
  - Global justice movement
- Anti-nuclear movement
- Autonomism
- Copyright reform movement
  - Copyleft
- Cyber-utopianism
- Economic democracy
  - Council democracy
  - Inclusive democracy
  - Industrial democracy
  - Soviet democracy
  - Workers' self-management
  - Workplace democracy
- Economic progressivism
- Egalitarianism
- Labour movement
- Left-wing nationalism
- Net neutrality movement
- Occupy movement
- Open-source-software movement
- Parecon
  - Participatory budgeting
- Parpolity
  - Participatory democracy
  - Participatory justice
  - Participatory planning
- Peace movement
  - Anti-militarism
  - Anti-war movement
  - Pacifism
- Radical democracy
- Social democratic populism
- Socialist populism

=== Right-wing populism ===
- Alt-lite movement
- Alt-right movement
- Anti-intellectualism
- Chauvinism
  - Welfare chauvinism
- Conservative populism
- Demagogy
- Market populism
- National conservatism
  - Post-communism
- National populism
- Nativism
  - Anti-immigration movement
- Neo-nationalism
- Neo-reactionary movement
- Paleoconservatism
- Penal populism
- Right-wing nationalism
  - Right-wing antiglobalism
- Reactionary populism
  - Radical right-wing populism
- Third Position
- Völkisch movement

=== Other ===
- Agrarianism
  - Agrarian reformism
    - Land reform movement
  - Physiocracy
- Communitarianism
- Direct democracy
- Euroscepticism
  - Hard Euroscepticism
  - Soft Euroscepticism
- Localism
- Regionalism
  - Sovereignism
- Valence populism

=== Regional variants ===
==== African ====
- Arab Spring movement

==== Asian ====
- Cyprus
  - Progressive Party of Working People
  - Solidarity Movement
- Georgia
  - Alliance of Patriots of Georgia
- India
  - Bahujan Samaj Party
    - Ambedkarism
  - Hindutva
    - Bharatiya Janata Party
      - Modism
- Iran
  - Iranian Green Movement
- Pakistan
  - Tehreek-e-Insaf
- Turkey
  - Justice and Development Party
    - Erdoğanism
    - Neo-Ottomanism
  - Nationalist Movement Party
    - Idealism
  - Millî Görüş
    - Erbakanism

==== American ====
- Latin America
  - Argentina
    - Kirchnerism
    - Peronism
  - Bolivia
    - Movement for Socialism
  - Brazil
    - Bolsonarism
    - Lulism
    - Petism
    - Podemos
  - Chile
    - Ibañism
  - Ecuador
    - PAIS Alliance
      - Correanism
  - Mexico
  - Nicaragua
    - Sandinism
  - Puerto Rico
  - Venezuela
    - Bolivarianism
      - Chavism
      - Fifth Republic Movement
- North America
  - Canada
  - United States
    - Black populism movement
    - Bull Moose populism
    - Coffee Party movement
    - Jacksonian democracy
    - Jeffersonian democracy
    - Longism
    - People's Party populism
    - Perotism
    - Progressive populism
    - Tea Party movement
    - Trumpism
      - QAnon

==== European ====
- Ancient Rome
  - Caesarism
  - Populares
- Austria
  - Freedom Party of Austria
  - NOW – List Pilz
- Belarus
  - Liberal Democratic Party of Belarus
- Belgium
  - People's Party
  - Vlaams Belang
- Bulgaria
  - United Patriots
  - Volya
- Croatia
  - Croatian Democratic Alliance of Slavonia and Baranja
  - Human Shield
- Cyprus
  - Citizens' Alliance
- Czech Republic
  - ANO 2011
  - Czech Pirate Party
  - Dawn – National Coalition
  - Euroscepticism
  - Freedom and Direct Democracy
  - Party of Civic Rights
- Denmark
  - Danish People's Party
  - Inuit Ataqatigiit
  - Red–Green Alliance
- Estonia
  - Conservative People's Party of Estonia
- European Union
  - Alliance for Direct Democracy in Europe
  - European Alliance for Freedom
  - European United Left–Nordic Green Left
  - Euroscepticism
    - Hard Euroscepticism
    - Soft Euroscepticism
  - Movement for a Europe of Nations and Freedom
  - Party of the European Left
- Finland
  - Finns Party
    - Blue Reform
  - Seven Star Movement
  - Left Alliance
- France
  - Debout la France
  - Frexit
  - La France Insoumise
  - Left Party
  - Paris Commune
    - Communard movement
  - Poujadism
  - Revolutionary France
    - Cordeliers
    - Hébertists
  - National Rally
  - Souverainism
  - Yellow vests movement
- Germany
  - Alternative for Germany
  - The Left
  - Bündnis Sahra Wagenknecht
- Greece
  - Ancient Athenian democracy
  - Anti-austerity movement
  - Golden Dawn
  - Grexit
  - Independent Greeks
  - Popular Unity
  - Syriza
- Hungary
  - Fidesz
    - Orbánism
  - Jobbik
  - Hungarian withdrawal from the European Union
- Italy
  - Five Star Movement
  - Italexit
  - Italian Left
  - Lega Nord
- Iceland
  - Centre Party
  - Left-Green Movement
  - Pirate Party
  - People's Party
- Ireland
  - Anti-austerity movement
    - Solidarity
  - Euroscepticism
  - Sinn Féin
- Liechtenstein
  - The Independents
- Lithuania
  - Order and Justice
- Luxembourg
  - Alternative Democratic Reform Party
  - The Left
- Nederlands
  - Forum for Democracy
  - Nexit
  - Party for Freedom
- Norway
  - Progress Party
- Poland
  - Congress of the New Right
  - Kukiz'15
  - Law and Justice
  - Real Politics Union
- Portugal
  - Anti-austerity movement
    - Left Bloc
- Romania
  - Greater Romania Party
  - Poporanism
  - Romanian withdrawal from the European Union
- Russia
  - A Just Russia
  - Liberal Democratic Party of Russia
  - Narodnik movement
  - Putinism
- San Marino
  - Active Citizenship
  - United Left
- Serbia
  - Dveri
  - Serbian Progressive Party
  - Serbian Radical Party
- Slovenia
  - The Left
  - List of Marjan Šarec
  - Slovenian Democratic Party
  - Slovenian National Party
- Spain
  - Anti-austerity movement
    - Anova–Nationalist Brotherhood
    - Podemos
    - United Left
  - Citizens
  - Vox
- Sweden
  - Left Party
  - Sweden Democrats
- Switzerland
  - Geneva Citizens' Movement
  - Landsgemeinde
  - Popular initiative
  - Swiss People's Party
  - Swiss semi-direct democracy
  - Ticino League
- Ukraine
  - Svoboda
- United Kingdom
  - Anti-austerity movement
  - Democratic Unionist Party
  - Euroscepticism
    - Brexit movement
  - UK Independence Party

==== Oceanian ====
- Australia
  - One Nation Party
- New Zealand
  - New Zealand First

== Progressivism ==
Political internationals

- Progressive Alliance (progressivism and social democracy)
- Progressive International (democratic socialism, left-wing populism, and progressivism)

=== General ===
- Economic progressivism
- Social progressivism
- Techno-progressivism
- Transnational progressivism

=== Other ===
- Progressive conservatism
- Reform movement
- Social justice movement
- Technocracy movement

=== Opposition ===
- Anti-progressivism

=== Religious variants ===
- Islamic progressivism
- Progressive Christianity

=== Regional variants ===
- Canada
- South Korea
  - Centrist reformism
- United Kingdom
- United States
  - American System
  - Great Society
    - War on Poverty
  - New Deal
    - Fair Deal
    - Green New Deal
  - New Freedom
  - New Frontier
  - Progressive democratism
    - Justice democratism
  - Progressive Era
    - Eugenics
    - New Nationalism
    - Square Deal
    - Temperance movement
      - Prohibitionism
    - Wilsonianism
  - Whigs

== Religio-political ideologies ==
Political internationals

- Centrist Democrat International (Christian democracy)
- Hizb ut-Tahrir (Islamism)
- Humanist International (humanism)
- Muslim Brotherhood (Islamism)

=== General ===
- Anti-Masonry
  - Christian anti-Masonry
  - Muslim anti-Masonry
- Clericalism
- Complementarianism
- Confessionalism
- Feminist theology
  - Thealogy
  - Womanist theology
- Freemasonry
- Humanism
  - Religious humanism
  - Secular humanism
- Messianism
- Millenarianism
- Political religion
- Postcolonial theology
- Religious anarchism
- Religious anti-Zionism
- Religious apoliticism
- Religious communism
- Religious egalitarianism
- Religious environmentalism
  - Spiritual ecology
- Religious liberalism
- Religious nationalism
- Religious pacifism
- Religious socialism
- Secularism
  - Anti-clericalism
  - Cult of Reason
  - Disestablishmentarianism
  - Secular religion
  - Secular state
- Spiritual left
- State religion
  - Antidisestablishmentarianism
  - Cult of the Supreme Being
    - Theophilanthropy
  - Theocracy
  - Theonomy

=== Political atheism and agnosticism ===
- Atheist feminism
- Marxist–Leninist atheism
- Secular humanism
- Secular liberalism
- State atheism

=== Political Baháʼí Faith ===
- New world order (Baháʼí)
  - Opposition

=== Political Buddhism ===
- Buddhist anarchism
- Buddhist feminism
- Buddhist modernism
  - Engaged Buddhism
  - Humanistic Buddhism
  - Secular Buddhism
- Buddhist nationalism
  - 969 Movement
  - Sinhalese Buddhist nationalism
- Buddhist socialism

=== Political Christianity ===
- Caesaropapism
- Christian democracy
  - Christian corporatism
  - Distributism
  - Gremialismo
  - Popolarismo
  - Social credit
- Christian egalitarianism
- Christian environmentalism
  - Ecotheology
  - Evangelical environmentalism
- Christian feminism
- Christian humanism
- Christian left
  - Christian anarchism
    - Diggers
    - Tolstoyan movement
  - Christian communism
    - Bruderhofs
    - Hutterites
    - Proto-communism
    - Shakers
  - Christian socialism
    - Utopian socialism
      - Levellers
  - Evangelical left
  - Liberal Christianity
  - Liberation theology
  - Progressive Christianity
  - Social Gospel
- Christian pacifism
- Christian right
  - Christian fundamentalism
    - Traditionalist Catholicism
  - Christian libertarianism
    - Libertarian Christianity
  - Christian nationalism
    - Christian Zionism
    - Christofascism
      - Clerical fascism
    - Clerico-nationalism
    - National Catholicism
  - Christian reconstructionism
    - Dominionism
  - Theoconservatism
- Distributism
  - Social credit movement
- Integralism
  - Integral humanism
  - Integrism
  - Integral nationalism
    - Brazilian
    - French
      - Maurrassisme
    - Lusitanian
- Jesuism
- Political Catholicism
  - Catholic Worker Movement
  - Ultramontanism
    - Neo-ultramontanism
- Political Mormonism
  - Deseret Nationalism
  - Mormon feminism
  - Mormon fundamentalism
  - Theodemocracy

=== Political Confucianism ===
- Neo-Confucianism
- New Confucianism

=== Political Hinduism ===
- Gandhism
  - Gandhian socialism
  - Hindu-Muslim unity
- Hindu feminism
- Hindu nationalism
  - Akhand Bharat
  - Hindutva
  - Integral humanism
- Hindu revivalism

=== Political indigenous religions ===
- Maori environmentalism

=== Political Islam ===
- Gülen movement
- Hindu-Muslim unity
- Islamic anarchism
- Islamic democracy
- Islamic environmentalism
- Islamic egalitarianism
- Islamic feminism
- Islamic liberalism
- Islamic modernism
- Islamic pacifism
- Islamic republicanism
  - Qutbism
  - Khomeinism
- Islamic socialism
- Islamism
  - Islamic fundamentalism
    - Jihadism
    - Worldwide caliphate
  - Post-Islamism
- Muslim nationalism in South Asia
  - Khilafat movement
- Pan-Islamism

=== Political Judaism ===
- Cultural Zionism
- Jewish anarchism
- Jewish Autonomism
- Jewish democracy
- Jewish egalitarianism
- Jewish environmentalism
- Jewish feminism
  - Orthodox Jewish feminism
- Jewish fundamentalism
- Jewish humanism
  - Homaranismo
- Jewish left
  - Bundism
- Jewish secularism
- Kibbutzim
  - Kibbutz movement
  - Religious Kibbutz Movement
- Zionism
  - Halachic state
  - Religious Zionism

=== Political Neopaganism ===
- Neopagan feminism
  - Reclaiming
- Romantic nationalism
  - Odalism
- Slavic Native Faith
  - Peterburgian Vedism
  - Ynglism
  - Zadrugism

=== Political Shinto ===
- State Shinto
  - Showa Statism

=== Political Sikhism ===
- Khalistan movement
- Sikh feminism

=== Political Taoism ===
- Huang–Lao
- Way of the Five Pecks of Rice
- Way of the Taiping

=== Political Zoroastrianism ===
- Mazdakism

== Satirical and anti-politics ==
=== General ===
- Abstentionism
- Anti-Centrism
- Apoliticism

=== Other ===
- Anti-politics
- Dark Enlightenment
- Nihilistic violent extremism
- Populism

=== Religious variants ===
- Political quietism

=== Regional variants ===
- Australia
- Belarus
- Belgium
- Canada
- Czechoslovakia
- Czech Republic
- Denmark
- Estonia
- Faroe Island
- Germany
- Hungary
- Iceland
- India
- Iran
- Italy
- Japan
- Malta
- New Zealand
- Netherlands
- Norway
- Poland
- Romania
- Serbia
- Spain
- Sweden
- United Kingdom
- United States

== Social democracy ==
Political internationals

- Foro de São Paulo (democratic socialism, left-wing populism, social democracy and socialism of the 21st century)
- Progressive Alliance (progressivism and social democracy)
- Socialist International (democratic socialism and social democracy)

=== General ===
- Labourism
- Marxism
  - Democratic socialism
  - Marxist revisionism
    - Bernsteinism
    - Eurocommunism
  - Orthodox Marxism
  - Revolutionary socialism
- Progressivism
  - Economic progressivism
  - Social progressivism
- Reformism
  - Reformist socialism
    - Ethical socialism
    - Fabianism
    - Gradualism
    - Immediatism
    - Lassallism
    - Liberal socialism
    - Possibilism
    - Utopian socialism

=== Other ===
- Democratic socialism
- Social democratic corporatism
  - Nordic model
- Social democratic populism
- Social democratic Shachtmanism
- Social democratic transhumanism
- Social democratic welfarism
- Third Way

=== Opposition ===
- Anti-welfarism
- Lemon socialism
- Social fascism

=== Regional variants ===
==== African ====
- Egypt
- Ghana
- Guinea
- Kenya
- Tanzania
- Tunisia

==== American ====
- Caribbean
- Latin America
  - Argentina
  - Bolivia
  - Brazil
  - Chile
  - Colombia
  - Costa Rica
  - Ecuador
  - Mexico
  - Nicaragua
  - Paraguay
  - Puerto Rico
  - Uruguay
  - Venezuela
- North America
  - Canada

==== Asian ====
- Bangladesh
- China
- Hong Kong
- India
- Iran
- Israel
- Japan
- Korea
- Kurdistan
- Myanmar
- Pakistan
- Philippines
- Syria

==== European ====
- Andorra
- Bulgaria
- Cyprus
- Denmark
- Finland
- France
- Germany
- Greece
- Iceland
- Ireland
- Italy
- Moldova
- Netherlands
- Norway
- Poland
- Portugal
- Romania
- Russia
- Slovakia
- Spain
- Sweden
- United Kingdom
  - England
    - New Labourism
      - Blairism
        - Blatcherism
      - Brownism
      - Gaitskellism
        - Butskellism
        - Labour revisionism
          - Third Way
    - Manchesterism
  - Northern Ireland
  - Scotland
  - Wales

==== Oceanian ====
- Australia
- Melanesia
- New Zealand

== Socialism ==
Symbol of Socialism

Political internationals

- African Socialist International (African socialism, Pan-Africanism)
- Foro de São Paulo (democratic socialism, left-wing populism and socialism of the 21st century)
- Progressive International (democratic socialism, left-wing populism, and progressivism)
- Socialist International (democratic socialism and social democracy)
- World Socialist Movement (anti-Leninism, classical Marxism, impossibilism and international socialism)

=== General ===
- Communism
- Democratic socialism
  - Democratic road to socialism
  - Menshevism
- Reformist socialism
  - Fabianism
  - Gradualism
  - Lassallism
  - Immediatism
  - Marxist revisionism
    - Bernsteinism
    - Eurocommunism
    - Social democracy
    - Sorelianism
  - Possibilism
- Revolutionary socialism
  - Impossibilism
  - Neo-Babouvism

=== Authoritarian ===
- Barracks socialism
  - Nechayevshchina
- Blanquism
- Bordigism
- Leninism
  - Democratic centralism
  - Marxism–Leninism
    - Brezhnevism
      - Real socialism
    - Castroism
    - Ceaușism
    - Dubčekism
    - Gorbachevism
    - Guevarism
      - Focalism
    - Ho Chi Minh Thought
    - Hoxhaism
    - Husakism
    - Juche
      - Kimilsungism
      - Kimilsungism–Kimjongilism
    - Kadarism
    - Khrushchevism
      - De-Stalinization
    - Maoism
      - Maoism–Third Worldism
        - Third Worldism
        - Third World socialism
      - Mao-Spontex
      - Marxism–Leninism–Maoism
        - Gonzalo Thought
        - Marxism–Leninism–Maoism–Prachanda Path
      - Pol Potism
      - Socialism with Chinese characteristics
        - Deng Xiaoping Theory
        - Mao Zedong Thought
        - Scientific Outlook on Development
        - Three Principles of the People
        - Three Represents
        - Xi Jinping Thought
    - Marxist–Leninist atheism
    - Scientific socialism
    - Stalinism
      - Anti-revisionism
      - Neo-Stalinism
      - Socialism in One Country
        - National communism
        - Socialist patriotism
          - Soviet socialist patriotism
      - Soviet anti-Zionism
    - Titoism
      - Đilasism
      - Rankovićism
      - Socialist nationalism
  - Trotskyism
    - Unorthodox Trotskyism
      - Pabloism
      - Posadism
      - Third camp Trotskyism
    - Orthodox Trotskyism
  - Vanguardism
  - War socialism
- Nechayevism
- Tkachevism

=== Libertarian ===
- Anarchism
  - Anarcho-socialism
  - Libertarian socialism
- Communard movement
- Communalism
  - Democratic confederalism
  - Eco-communalism
  - Libertarian municipalism
  - Social ecology
- Left-libertarianism
  - Economic democracy
    - Council democracy
    - Inclusive democracy
    - Industrial democracy
    - Soviet democracy
    - Workers' self-management
    - Workplace democracy
  - Free-market anarchism
    - Free-market socialism
      - Laissez-faire socialism
      - Mutualism
      - Neo-mutualism
      - Proudhonian socialism
      - Spoonerian socialism
      - Tuckerite socialism
  - Individualist anarchism
  - Libertarian possibilism
  - Parecon
  - Parpolity
  - Social anarchism
  - Steiner–Vallentyne school
- Marxism
  - Classical Marxism
    - Orthodox Marxism
      - Impossibilism
        - World Socialist Movement
      - Kautskyism
  - Libertarian Marxism
    - Autonomism
      - Workerism
    - Left communism
      - Bordigism
      - Communization
      - Council communism
        - Spartacism
      - Luxemburgism
      - Situationism
      - Socialisme ou Barbarie
      - Solidarity
      - Spontaneism
      - Ultra-leftism
    - Mao-Spontex
    - Marxism–De Leonism
    - Unorthodox Trotskyism
      - Chaulieu–Montal tendency
      - Johnson–Forest tendency
      - Third camp
        - Shachtmanism
          - Left Shachtmanism
    - Open Marxism
  - Western Marxism
    - Austro-Marxism
    - Christofiasism
    - Frankfurt School
    - Freudo-Marxism
    - Hegelian Marxism
    - Marxist humanism
      - Budapest School
      - Praxis School
    - Neo-Marxism
      - Analytical Marxism
      - Conflict theories
        - Dependency theory
        - Social conflict theory
        - World-systems theory
      - Freudo–Marxism
      - Gramscianism
        - Neo-Gramscianism
      - Instrumental Marxism
      - Neue Marx-Lektüre
      - Political Marxism
      - Structural Marxism
    - Post-Marxism
      - Radical democracy
        - Abahlali baseMjondolo
        - Landless Workers' Movement
        - Piqueteros
        - Zapatistas
          - Neozapatismo
- Syndicalism
  - De Leonism
  - Revolutionary syndicalism
  - Wobblyism
- Third camp socialism

=== Other ===
- Agrarian socialism
- African socialism
  - Harambee
  - Nkrumaism
  - Senghorism
  - Ubuntuism
  - Ujamaa
- Arab socialism
  - Ba'athism
  - Nasserism
  - Third International Theory
- Centrist Marxism
- Communitarianism
- Copyleft
- Eco-socialism
- Economic egalitarianism
- Economic progressivism
- Ethical socialism
- Guild socialism
- International socialism
- Kibbutz movement
- Labourism
- Liberal socialism
- Market socialism
  - Langian socialism
  - Millian socialism
  - Ricardian socialism
  - Smithian socialism
  - Veblenian socialism
- Marxist democracy
- Millennial socialism
- Municipal socialism
- Queer socialism
- Proto-socialism
  - Chartists
  - Communards
  - Diggers
  - Jacobins
  - Levellers
  - Radicals
- Radicalism
- Scientific socialism
- Social egalitarianism
- Social democracy
- Socialism of the 21st century
- Socialist feminism
  - Marxist feminism
- Socialist nationalism
- Socialist populism
- Utopian socialism
  - Fourierism
  - Icarians
  - Owenism
  - Saint-Simonianism
- World socialism

=== Opposition ===
- Anti-socialism

=== Religious variants ===
- Buddhist socialism
- Christian socialism
  - Diggers
  - Christian communism
  - Levellers
  - Liberation theology
  - Proto-socialism
  - Social Gospel
- Islamic socialism
  - Islamic Marxism
- Jewish socialism
  - Bundism
  - Kibbutzim
- Mazdakism

=== Regional variants ===
==== African ====
- Angola
- Benin
- Congo
- Egypt
- Eritrea
- Ethiopia
- Ghana
- Guinea
- Kenya
  - Kenya People's Union
- Libya
  - Third International Theory
- Madagascar
- Mali
- Mozambique
- Senegal
- Somalia
- South Africa
  - Abahlali baseMjondolo
  - Trotskyism
- Tanzania
- Tunisia
- Zanzibar

==== American ====
- Caribbean
  - Granada
- Latin America
  - Argentina
  - Bolivia
    - Fejuve
  - Brazil
    - Landless Workers' Movement
    - Lulism
  - Chile
  - Colombia
  - Costa Rica
    - Figuerism
  - Ecuador
  - Mexico
    - Magonism
    - Zapatism
      - Neo-Zapatism
        - Zapatistas
  - Nicaragua
    - Sandinismo
  - Paraguay
  - Uruguay
  - Venezuela
- North America
  - Canada
  - United States
    - African-American leftism
    - American Left
    - Sewer socialism

==== Asian ====
- Afghanistan
- Armenia
- Azerbaijan
- Bangladesh
- Bukharan
- Cambodia
  - Khmer Rouge
  - Salvation Front
- China
  - Chinese Soviet Republic
  - Hong Kong
  - Kuomintang
    - Three Principles of the People
      - Dai Jitao Thought
- Georgia
- India
  - Gandhian socialism
  - Nehruism
- Indonesia
- Iran
- Israel
- Japan
- Kazakhstan
- Kyrgyzstan
- Korea
  - North Korea
  - South Korea
- Laos
- Mongolia
- Myanmar
- Nepal
- Pakistan
- Palestine
- Pakistan
- Philippines
- Syria
  - Democratic confederalism
- Tajikistan
- Turkey
- Turkmenistan
- Uzbekistan
- Vietnam
  - Trotskyism
- Yemen

==== European ====
- Albania
- Andorra
- Bosnia, and Herzegovina
- Bulgaria
- Byelarus
- Croatia
- Cyprus
- Czechoslovakia
- Denmark
- Estonia
  - Commune of the Working People of Estonia
- Finland
  - Left Alliance
- France
  - Jacobinism
- Germany
  - East Germany
- Greece
- Hungary
- Iceland
- Ireland
- Italy
  - Italian road to socialism
- Latvia
- Lithuania
- Macedonia
- Moldova
- Montenegro
- Netherlands
- Norway
- Poland
- Portugal
- Romania
  - Socialist nationalism
- Social Democratic Party
- Russia
  - Narodniks
  - Mensheviks
  - Bolsheviks
    - Centre
      - Kamenevism
      - Stalinism
      - Zinovievism
    - Left Opposition
      - Trotskyism
    - Old Bolsheviks
      - Recallists
      - Ultimatists
    - Right Opposition
      - Bukharinism
      - Noginism
      - Rykovism
      - Tomskyism
  - Soviet democracy
- Serbia
- Slovenia
- Spain
- Sweden
- Ukraine
  - Makhnovism
- United Kingdom
  - England
    - Old Labourism
      - Bennism
      - Bevanism
      - Corbynism
      - Manchesterism
  - New Left
  - Trotskyism
- Yugoslavia

==== Oceanian ====
- Australia
- Melanesia
- New Zealand

== Syndicalism ==
Political internationals

- International Confederation of Labor (anarcho-syndicalism and revolutionary syndicalism)
- International Workers' Association (anarcho-syndicalism)

=== General ===
- Anarcho-syndicalism
- Co-operatism
- De Leonism
- Revolutionary syndicalism
- Sorelianism
- Wobblyism

=== Other ===
- Council communism
- Democratic socialism
- Guild socialism
- Libertarian socialism
- National syndicalism
  - France
  - Italy
  - Portugal
  - Spain
- Social anarchism
- Social democracy
- Orthodox Marxism
- Utopian socialism

=== Opposition ===
- Anti-unionism

=== Regional variants ===
- Argentina
- Brazil
- France
- Germany
- Italy
- Netherlands
- Norway
- Russia
- Spain
- Sweden
- United Kingdom
- United States

== Transhumanism ==
Political internationals

- Humanity+ (transhumanist politics)

=== General ===
- Anarcho-transhumanism
- Democratic transhumanism
- Libertarian transhumanism

=== Other ===
- Anti-aging movement
- Extropianism
- Immortalism
- Post-genderism
- Post-politicism
- Singularitarianism
- Technogaianism
- Technological utopianism
- Techno-progressivism

=== Regional variants ===
- United States

== See also ==
- Direct democracy
- Ideology
- List of communist ideologies
- List of forms of government
- List of ideologies named after people
- List of political systems in France
- Participatory democracy
- Political international
- Political party
- Political philosophy
- Representative democracy
- Suffrage
  - Universal suffrage
