= Corporate nationalism =

Ideology which emphasizes the blending of corporate and national interests

Corporate nationalism is a phrase that is used to convey various meanings:

- A political culture in which members believe the basic unit of society and the primary concern of the state is the corporate group rather than the individual, and the interests of the corporate group are the same as the interests of the nation.
- Corporations should work mainly for the national good rather than the good of their owners.
- Corporations should be protected from foreign ownership.
- Corporations should or may be nationalized.
- The state is biased towards corporate interests.

== State should deal with corporations rather than individuals ==
Corporate nationalism may be used to describe a political philosophy and economic theory whose adherents are corporatists and believe that the basic unit of the society, be it the family or other corporate groups, has the same interests as the nation. Some, therefore, believe that the state should deal primarily with corporations, which may include companies, worker's cooperatives, unions, and so on, and allow these units to organize themselves to serve their members as they feel fit.

== National corporations should be protected from foreign ownership ==
Norway has a history of state campaigns to block foreign companies from taking over major Norwegian firms. In 2005, PepsiCo was rumored to be planning a bid to take over French food group Danone, arousing popular outcry. A former boss of Danone said, "Danone is like Chartres cathedral, and one does not buy the cathedral of Chartres."

== Corporations should (may) be nationalized ==
The phrase may be used to describe national intervention in corporations, including outright nationalization where the state assumes ownership of the corporation. Some see US government interventions in the financial industry, including the effective nationalization of Fannie Mae and Freddie Mac, as a form of corporate nationalism.

== State biased towards corporate interests ==
Some libertarians in the United States consider that the end of slavery coincided with the start of a regime "tainted" by aggressive corporate nationalism, or government intervention into the economy. In this view, the destruction of chattel slavery preserved and perpetuated "bourgeois" slavery.

== See also ==
- Corporatism – Political ideology which advocates the organization of society by corporate groups
- Corporate statism – Corporatist political culture
- Corporatocracy – Society controlled by business corporations
- Nationalism – Ideology promoting the nation-state
- Producerism – Belief that workers benefit society more than those who get wealth through other means
- Corporatization – Transformation of publicly owned or governmental organizations into business corporations
- Autocracy – Form of government
- Napoleon III – Emperor of the French from 1852 to 1870
- Benito Mussolini – Dictator of Italy from 1922 to 1943
