= People's National Party (Tonga) =

People's National Party Paati Tufunga Fonua ‘a e Kakai
- Leader: Siamelie Latu
- Founded: 9 June 2018
- Ideology: Cultural conservatism Monarchism
- Colors: red, brown

Website
- Facebook page

The People's National Party is a political party in Tonga. The party was formed in June 2018 and is led by former diplomat Siamelie Latu. Other key members include former finance minister ʻAisake Eke and Auckland-based lawyer Sione Fonua.

The party supports "traditional Tongan values" and the monarchy.
