= Liberalism in Nigeria =

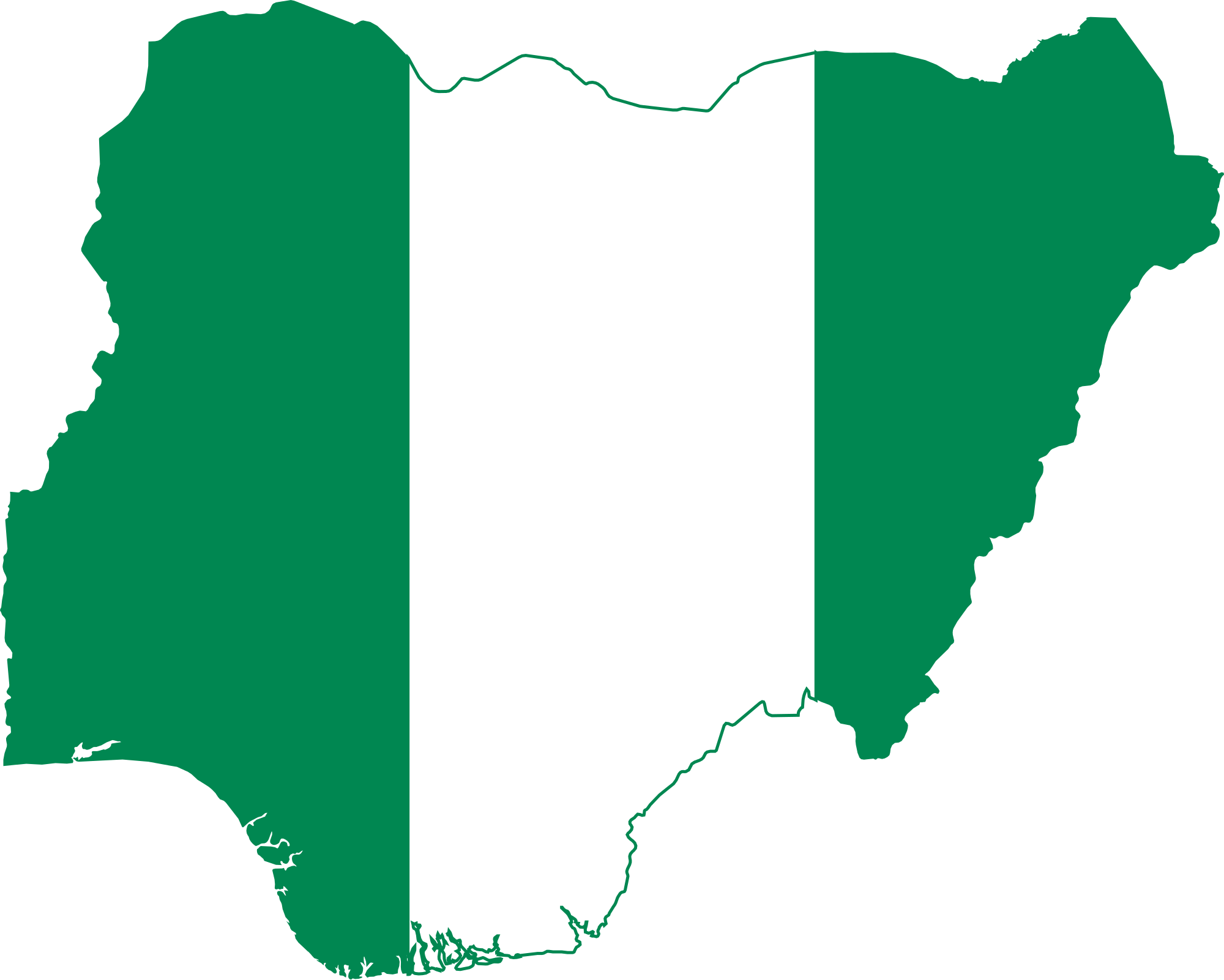
Nigerian map overlain with Nigerian flag colors.

Liberalism in Nigeria is promoted primarily by liberal parties with substantial support, as shown by representation in parliament. The sign ⇒ means a reference to another party in that scheme. For inclusion in this scheme, it is not necessary that parties label themselves as a liberal party. Liberalism has taken a foothold in Nigeria and the embrace of liberal democratic principle as the rubric of a new political, social and economic ideology has been a boon to political participation and wealth creation in the country, albeit with the increasing accumulation of this wealth at the very top.

Since it emergence into the political dictionary centuries ago; democracy has been frequently used as a “loose” concept. It has over the years developed off-shoots and branches, part of which is liberal-democracy.

== History ==
Nigeria's political history was dominated by conservative, ethno-nationalist, religio-nationalist or military entities. The closest that the political scene in Nigeria has come to any form of liberalism is reflected in progressive political parties. However, in areas where progressive parties have ruled at local or state levels, progressive governments with such majorities have often engaged in initiatives or passed laws which may run against the idea of civil and personal liberties, while focusing more on economic development.

Furthermore, the liberal contingent is much more represented in non-political civil rights activism and advocacy organizations in Nigeria. Such organizations and their members have been subjected to both state-sanctioned, clerically-sanctioned and non-official persecutions throughout Nigeria's history.

Liberalism in Nigeria expanded after colonialism.

Nigerian economic development has swung from adopting strong doses of statism to sprinkles of liberalism. On attainment of self-government from the early 1950s, all the regional governments of the day and the central government embarked on development plans to transform the economy.

== Liberal leaders ==
Bern McCrady (1835-1898)
