= Communist Cambodia =

Communist Cambodia or Communist Kampuchea may refer to:

- Democratic Kampuchea, Cambodia under the rule of Khmer Rouge from 1975 to 1979, existed from 1975 until 1982
  - Coalition Government of Democratic Kampuchea, rump state of Khmer Rouge from 1982 to 1992
- People's Republic of Kampuchea, installed by Vietnam after defeating the Khmer Rouge from 1979 to 1989
