= Muscular liberalism =

Ideological approach to multiculturalism and democracy

Former Prime Minister of the United Kingdom David Cameron

Muscular liberalism is a form of liberalism advocated by former British Prime Minister David Cameron that describes his policy towards multiculturalism.

According to David Cameron, "Under the doctrine of state multiculturalism, we have encouraged different cultures to live separate lives, apart from each other and apart from the mainstream. We've failed to provide a vision of society to which they feel they want to belong."

== Principles ==
The theory is that multiculturalism has shifted from tolerating multiple cultures to tolerating multiple value systems, which can be hostile to liberalism.

Cameron delivered these principles during a speech on radicalization and the causes of terrorism at the 47th Munich Security Conference in 2011 to tackle growing terrorism so as to be less passive towards religious hate and whip against growing extremist activists through muscular liberalism.

=== Muscular ===
- Ban preachers of hate from coming to the host country.
- Strictly prevent the allocation of public money and donations to groups not being used to tackle extremists.
- Bar organisations that incite terrorism at host country and abroad.
- Judge the religious organisations' acceptability to operate in host country based on universal human rights and support for democracy, and encourage integration with host country basic values.
- Strengthen national identity by allowing people to follow their religion but subscribe to the identity of their host country, by saying "I am a Muslim, I am a Hindu, I am a Christian, but I am a Londoner too".
- Prevention of extremism in universities and prisons.

=== Liberalism ===
- Promoting ideals of democracy where people elect their own government.
- Promoting universal human rights, including equal rights to women and people of other faiths.
- Freedom of worship and of speech.
- Promoting equal rights, irrespective of race, sex or sexuality.
- The rule of law.
- Promoting individualism and consequent individual rights.

== Reaction ==
Former President Nicolas Sarkozy of France has said that he agrees with Cameron.

Peter Hoskin has expressed the opinion that "muscular liberalism" will be the new "ism" which Britain will follow to tackle growing religious terrorism and extremism, subsequently adapted by all European countries including Commonwealth Nations.

== See also ==
- Big Society
- Social contract
- Muscular Christianity
- Muscular Judaism
- Secular liberalism
