= Husakism =

Ideology of Czechoslovak leader Gustáv Husák

Husakism (Czech: husákismus; Slovak: husákizmus) is an ideology connected with the politician Gustáv Husák of Communist Czechoslovakia which has two different meanings and it was first used by Karol Bacílek to denounce the alleged "bourgeois nationalism" of Husák in the 1950s, which is however seen as false as of today. The later and more frequent use is for the ideology of Husák's "normalization" and federalism, the state ideology of Czechoslovakia from about 1969 to 1989, formulated by Husák, Vasil Biľak and others.
