= Welfare chauvinism =

Policy advocating welfare benefits just for certain groups

Welfare chauvinism or welfare state nationalism is the political notion that welfare benefits should be restricted to certain groups, particularly to the natives of a country as opposed to immigrants, or should be for the majority, excluding ethnic minorities.

It is used as an argument by right-wing populist parties, to connect the problems of the welfare state to immigration and welfare recipients. The focus is placed on categorising state residents in two extremes: the "nourishing" and "debilitating" and the contradiction between them in the competition for the society's resources.

== Background ==
The term welfare chauvinism was first used in social science in the 1990 paper "Structural changes and new cleavages: The progress parties in Denmark and Norway" by Jørgen Goul Andersen and Tor Bjørklund. The authors described it as the notion that "welfare services should be restricted to our own".

== "Nourishing" and "debilitating" ==
In the description of society and the problems of the welfare state, populists, especially right-wing populists and welfare chauvinists, use a line of argument based on two extremes in which citizens are divided into 'nourishing' and 'debilitating' groups. The nourishing group consists of those who are a part of society's welfare and the country's prosperity: community builders; "the people"; the ordinary honest working man. The second group as standing outside of "the people" are the debilitating group, believed to be promoting or utilizing welfare without adding any value to society. The debilitating group consists of bureaucrats, academics, immigrants, the unemployed, welfare recipients and others. As such, welfare is seen as a system with embedded exclusion mechanisms.

== Right-wing populists and welfare chauvinism ==
According to welfare chauvinists, the safety nets of the welfare state are for those whom they believe belong in the community. By the right-wing populist standard, affiliations with society are based in national, cultural and ethnic or racial aspects. Considered to be included in the category are those that are regarded as nourishing. The debilitating group (primarily immigrants) is considered to be outside of society and to be unjustly utilizing the welfare system. In essence, welfare chauvinists consider immigration to be a drain on societal scarce resources. They believe these resources should be used for the ethnically homogeneous native population, preferably children and the elderly.

The same principle of argument is, according to the academics Peer Scheepers, Mérove Gijsberts and Marcel Coenders, transferred to the labor market, where the competition for jobs is made out to be an ethnic conflict between immigrants and the native population. In times of high unemployment this rhetorical coupling amplifies and enhances the legitimacy of the welfare chauvinist and other xenophobic arguments.

== Political parties and welfare chauvinism ==
Notable contemporary political parties and groups that have employed welfare chauvinist argumentation include Alternative for Germany (AfD) in Germany and the Party for Freedom (PVV) in The Netherlands.

A cultural trend towards welfare chauvinism has gained ground in Britain, particularly with the rise of UKIP and then since 2016's EU Referendum. This rise resulting in the Conservative Party adopting such discourse and policies in an effort to appeal to voters whose attitudes have changed in the interim.

== See also ==
- Chauvinism
- Ethnopluralism
- Herrenvolk democracy
- Ingroup bias
- National conservatism
- Political incorrectness
- Populism
- Producerism
- Strasserism
- Welfare spending
- Welfarism
