= Religious anti-Zionism =

Opposition to the State of Israel within religious contexts

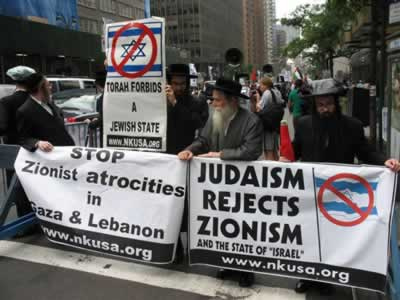
Neturei Karta, an anti-Zionist Jewish group

While anti-Zionism usually utilizes ethnic and political arguments against the existence or policies of the state of Israel, anti-Zionism has also been expressed within religious contexts which have, at times, colluded and collided with the ethnopolitical arguments over Israel's legitimacy. Outside of the liberal and socialist fields of anti-Zionist currents, the religious (and often ethnoreligious) arguments tend to predominate as the driving ideological power within the incumbent movements and organizations, and usually target the Israeli state's relationship with Judaism.

== Within Judaism ==
From the beginning of the Zionist movement, there were many traditional religious Jews who opposed it due to their opposition to nationalism (Jewish or otherwise) which they regarded as a secular ideology, and because of an inherent suspicion of change. Much of the thought generated by traditional religious anti-Zionism is focused on the Three Oaths, a portion of the Talmud which forbids waging war to establish a Jewish state. Key traditionalist opponents of Zionism included Israel Meir Kagan (Lithuania), Chaim Soloveitchik (Brisk), Sholom Dovber Schneersohn (Chabad), Isaac Breuer, Hillel Zeitlin, Aaron Shmuel Tamares, Elazar Shapiro (Muncatz), and Joel Teitelbaum, all waged ideological religious, as well as political, battles with Zionism each in their own way.

Today, the main Jewish theological opposition to Zionism stems from the Satmar Hasidim, which has more than 150,000 adherents worldwide. Even more strongly opposed to Zionism is the small Haredi Jewish organization known as Neturei Karta, which has less than 5,000 members, almost all of whom live in Israel. According to The Guardian, "[e]ven among Charedi, or ultra-Orthodox circles, the Neturei Karta are regarded as a wild fringe".

== In Christianity ==
Throughout Christianity, various denominations have held that there is a Christian theological basis for Zionism, although some groups do adhere to a position of Christian Zionism. In the United States, the General Assembly of the National Council of Churches, an ecumenical body of various Christian denominations, in November 2007 approved a resolution for further study which stated that the "theological stance of Christian Zionism adversely affects:

- justice and peace in the Middle East, delaying the day when Israelis and Palestinians can live within secure borders
- relationships with Middle Eastern Christians (see the Jerusalem Declaration on Christian Zionism)
- relationships with Jews, since Jews are seen as mere pawns in an eschatological scheme
- relationships with Muslims, since it treats the rights of Muslims as subordinate to the rights of Jews
- interfaith dialogue, since it views the world in starkly dichotomous terms"

=== Catholic Church ===
The Catholic Church rejects a theological basis for Zionism and has historically opposed it. The Vatican has nonetheless had diplomatic relations with Israel since 1993 (as a result of the Oslo Accords). It has also had diplomatic relations with the State of Palestine since 2015. Many Catholics are themselves divided over political support of Israel. In the 20th and 21st centuries, certain Catholic theologians such as André Villeneuve, Gary Anderson and Gavin D'Costa, have written in support of Christian Zionism; other theologians, such as Matthew A. Tsakanikas, have written against it.

=== Protestantism ===
Many Protestant churches have rejected a religious basis for Zionism and condemned the ideology, despite a large number evangelicals constituting those who support it.

==== Lutheranism ====
The Lutheran Churches have historically taught the doctrine of supersessionism, which holds that the Church is the New Israel. This continues to be taught in Confessional Lutheran denominations, such as the Lutheran Church – Missouri Synod, which have rejected a Christian theological basis for Zionism.

==== Reformed ====
The Reformed (Continental Reformed, Presbyterian, Congregationalist and Reformed Anglican) tradition adheres to covenant theology and historically has taught that "Christ fulfills the expectations of Jewish covenant life and renews the people of God rooted in the Old Testament and Judaism" and that "Jesus is the new temple, the new Israel."

The Reformed Church in America at its 2004 General Synod found "the ideology of Christian Zionism and the extreme form of dispensationalism that undergirds it to be a distortion of the biblical message noting the impediment it represents to achieving a just peace in Israel/Palestine." As of September 2007, Reformed churches in the US that have criticized Christian Zionism include the Presbyterian Church (USA), and the United Church of Christ.

In April 2013 the Church of Scotland published "The Inheritance of Abraham: A Report on the Promised Land", which rejects the idea of a special right of Jewish people to the Holy Land through analysis of scripture and Jewish theological claims. The report draws on the writings of anti-Zionist Jews and Christians. According to Ira Glunts, it was revised after Scottish Jews harshly criticized it, replacing input from Mark Braverman with material from Marc H. Ellis, both Jewish. The revision says that criticism of Israel's policies toward the Palestinians "should not be misunderstood as questioning the right of the State of Israel to exist".

In 2014, a controversy arose when the United States Presbyterian Church (PCUSA) published a study guide, Zionism Unsettled, quickly withdrawn from sale on its website, that asserted that the Israeli-Palestinian conflict was fueled by a "pathology inherent in Zionism". Cary Nelson argued that the work and the Church's position were flawed, anti-Zionist, and antisemitic. In 2022, the same denomination's general assembly determined that Israel is an apartheid state.

==== Anglicanism ====
On 9 July 2012, the Anglican General Synod passed a motion affirming support for the Ecumenical Accompaniment Programme in Palestine and Israel (EAPPI). This was criticised by the Board of Deputies claiming the Synod 'has chosen to promote an inflammatory and partisan programme'. The EAPPI was simultaneously criticized for its publication of a call for sit-ins at Israeli embassies, the hacking of government websites to promote its message, and support for the Boycott, Divestment and Sanctions campaign against Israel.

==== Anabaptism ====
The Mennonite Central Committee has criticized Christian Zionism, noting in a 2005 publication that in some churches under Christian Zionist influence the "congregations 'adopt' illegal Israeli settlements, sending funds to bolster the defense of these armed colonies."

== In Islam ==
Muslims have made several arguments to oppose the state of Israel. Importantly, the vast majority of Palestinians (around 93%) follow Islam.

Quran 22:39–40 gives permission for Muslims to fight those who "drove them from their homes", thus some Muslims believed jihad against Israel was justified due to the 1948 Palestinian expulsions. Likewise Iranian Islamists also cited the expulsion of Palestinians in their opposition to Israel. The founder of Hamas, Ahmad Yassin, said "we are not fighting Jews because they are Jews! We are fighting them because they assaulted us, they killed us, they took our land, our homes." Yusuf al-Qaradawi cited the expulsion of Palestinians. A fatwa from the European Council for Fatwa and Research condemned "Zionists who usurped Palestinian lands and forcibly expelled the Palestinians from their own homes."

After the Oslo Accords, there were debates on the agreement's legitimacy from an Islamic perspective. Abd al-Aziz Ibn Baz, the grand mufti of Saudi Arabia, supported the accords, while Yusuf al-Qaradawi opposed them. Ibn-Baz argued Islam allowed for both definite and indefinite peace agreements; Muhammad had concluded permanent treaties with several Arab tribes. However, indefinite treaties may only be made if there are in the community's interest, and may be broken when they harm the community's interest; Ibn Baz urged Palestinians to cooperate with Accords to avoid bloodshed. Both Ibn-Baz and Qaradawi agreed that according to Quran 8:61 ^{(Translated by Yusuf Ali)} Muslims should accept peace if the enemy offers it to them. But Qaradawi opined that Israeli actions did not show intention towards peace as Israel continued its occupation and expanded settlements.

Palestinian Muslims and other Muslim groups, as well as the government of Iran (since the 1979 Islamic Revolution), insist that the State of Israel is illegitimate and refuse to refer to it as "Israel", instead using the locution "the Zionist entity" (see Iran–Israel relations). In an interview with Time Magazine in December 2006, Mahmoud Ahmadinejad said "Everyone knows that the Zionist regime is a tool in the hands of the United States and British governments".

Some Muslims view the existence of Israel as an intrusion into what sharia law defines as Dar al-Islam, a domain they believe should be ruled by Muslims, reflecting the historical conquest of the Palestine region in the name of Islam.

== See also ==
- Religious antisemitism
- Negation of the Diaspora
- Muslim supporters of Israel
- Antisemitism in Islam
- Supersessionism
- Palestinian Christians
- Antisemitism in Christianity
