= Nationalism in Trinidad and Tobago =

Nationalism in Trinidad and Tobago encompasses nationalistic or patriotic sentiment in Trinidad and Tobago, a Caribbean island country with significant Indigenous, Spanish, African and Indian heritage.

== Background ==
Spanish migration took place in the 1600s, following slave raids that wiped out a large portion of indigenous life in Trinidad and Tobago.

The first major migration to the islands began with an influx of Indian citizens migrating to Trinidad in 1845. This migration marked the first chapter of the cultural formation of the nation and of its current racial diversity. It brought new cultural, racial, political and often religious values and beliefs that conflicted and complemented the previous Spanish influences.

Trinidad and Tobago received their independence on 31 August 1962, and the two islands have been considered a republic since that time. This foundation of the dual-island republic marked the formation of its modern-day nationalism.

== Culture ==
The mix of nationalities, customs and culture of the modern-day republic contribute significantly to the nationalism of Trinidad and Tobago. The early Indian influence, paired with the Caribbean location and culture of the dual-island republic, made way for Creole culture largely founded upon these customs.

A particularly famous Trinbagonian cultural custom, that is globally renowned as representative of West Indian culture is the Trinidad Carnival. "However, this cultural practice has been prevalent in Trinidad and Tobago from shortly after the cultural renaissance of post- World War 2. Trinidad and Tobago developed a rich cultural life from early colonial times, enhanced by the striking diversity of the population. Carnival, calypso and the steelband" (which emerged just after World War 2) were at the heart of the Creole cultural complex" The unique dress worn by females at the festival (feathers, gems and festive undergarments) mostly with wings) shows components of Spanish, Native American and Indian Traditional Dress. The Trinbagonian Culture is similarly grounded upon the ideals of multi-nationalism.

Modern-day Calypso music originated on Trinidad and Tobago, and is derived from West African traditions of musical form and structure. It was brought there by enslaved people, and was a way of spreading ideas and recording cultural events at a time of low literacy. The Black Power movement in the 1970s spawned a number of nationalistic calypso musicians in the republic, such as Black Stalin who was known for his militant lyrics.

== Race and discrimination issues ==
The discrimination prevalent in Trinidad and Tobago is not only between difference racial groups. For lower socio-economic groups, occupational discrimination meant lower opportunities for higher income positions and fostered the growth of the pay disparity between both racial and socio-economic groups. This discrimination became a focal contributor to the civil rights activism that branded a sector of Trinbagonian Nationalism during the 1960s. Naturally, the racial disputes and disagreements that the dual-island have with neighbouring nationals contributed to the nationalism of Trinidad and Tobago. For the dual-island, a significant nationalistic dispute is between both Trinidad and Tobago and Barbados. During a course of over three decades the nations underwent diplomatic meetings. The dispute was around the distribution of maritime spaces, hydrocarbons and fisheries. It went on between the periods of 1988 to 2004 and included treaties and ended in Barbados taking the case to arbitration on 16 February 2004. The dispute was not only political, it also drove a wedge socially and culturally between the nations that resulted in higher levels of low grade crime.

== Evolution ==
The evolution of culture, politics and media play into the way in which the nationalism of Trinidad and Tobago plays an individual role in the way in which the nation is viewed currently in both its nationalism and as a nation state. The evolution of social and cultural issues act as an indication of the nationalistic evolution. These national issues that have either evolved or more recently come into relevance are an indication of this. A primary issue in the current climate in Trinidad and Tobago is around female rights and sexual rights. The negotiation for sex rights and reduced discrimination begun, being prevalent, for Trinidad and Tobago, in the 1960s. This largely meant establishing more legitimate legal and political grounding for the rights and freedoms of those with female bodies, surrounding civil and sexual issues. Similarly, in 2018, the previous political ban on same sex intimacy was overturned on 13 April 2018."section 13 of Trinidad and Tobago’s Sexual Offenses Act punishes “buggery,” or anal intercourse, punishable by sentences of up to 25 years in prison. Section 16 of the same act, on “serious indecency,” stipulates that a person who is sexually intimate with a person of the same sex without having intercourse is liable to imprisonment for up to five years." As the culture around same sex rights evolves, with it the values, principles and beliefs evolve; the nationalism of the Trinbagonian region. This is a major representation of nationalism in that the cultural and social issues that a nation concerns itself with, majorly reflect upon what the nation stands for; henceforth its nationalism.
