= Sectarian democracy =

Sectarian democracies are multifactional countries where the faction with the greatest power has a democratic government that is discriminatory towards the other faction.

== Present-day Iraq ==
Iraq is currently a sectarian democracy where Shiite control the majority of the government. This is partly because Shiites are the dominant religious group in Iraq and partly because many Sunnis boycotted the elections. Despite the sectarian nature of the government, there are elected Sunnis and Kurds in positions of power.

== Apartheid South Africa ==
Under apartheid, South Africa was a sectarian democracy which some called a "white-only democracy". White South Africans enjoyed the right to vote and to participate in the political process whereas the Black South Africans were oppressed. The end of apartheid brought about consociationalist-like government allowing for powersharing between Black and White South Africans.

== Northern Ireland ==
The political power was concentrated in the hands of the Protestant Unionists and this led to sectarian violence until the establishment of a consociationalist-like government which allowed powersharing between the Protestant Unionists and the Catholic Nationalists.
