= Main Street Republicans =

Factions within the US political party

Main Street Republicans comprise several factions with varying philosophies in the Republican Party of the United States.

There are three meanings for this term.

- Generally, Main Street Republicans are the party's small-town, rural, and small-business supporters, generally perceived as being more socially conservative than the big-business "Wall Street" faction, which is largely perceived as being predominantly in favor of reduced taxation and business regulation; and as either unconcerned or openly hostile to frequently held "Main Street" positions in opposition to abortion, gay rights, and similar issues of major concern.
- In the U.S. state of New Hampshire, Main Street Republicans are the more moderate faction in the New Hampshire House of Representatives, in contrast to the more conservative group styled the "House Republican Alliance."
- In Congress, the Republican Main Street Partnership is a similar moderate group composed of Republican members. In addition to 70 members of Congress the group also identifies 2 current GOP governors as members.
