= Secular liberalism =

Form of liberalism which involves secular values

Secular liberalism is a form of liberalism in which secularist principles and values, and sometimes non-religious ethics, are especially emphasised. It supports the separation of religion and state. Moreover, secular liberals are usually advocates of liberal democracy and the open society as models for organising stable and peaceful societies.

Secular liberalism stands at the other end of the political spectrum from religious authoritarianism, as seen in theocratic states and illiberal democracies. It is often associated with stances in favour of social equality and political freedom.

== Description ==
Being secularists by definition, secular liberals tends to favour secular states over theocracies or states with a state religion. Secular liberals advocate separation of church and state in the formal constitutional and legal sense. Secular liberal views typically see religious ideas about society, and religious arguments from authority drawn from various sacred texts, as having no special status, authority, or purchase in social, political, or ethical debates. It is common for secular liberals to advocate the teaching of religion as a historical and cultural phenomenon, and to oppose religious indoctrination or lessons which promote religion as fact in schools. Among those who have been labelled as secular liberals are prominent atheists like Richard Dawkins, Christopher Hitchens, and Sam Harris.

The label of "secular liberal" can sometimes be confusing as to what it refers to. While the term secular can sometimes be used as an adjective for atheists and non-religious people, chiefly in American usage, in British English it is more likely to refer to people who are secularists, which is to say, people who believe in keeping religion and government apart. The atheist writer Richard Dawkins can be categorised under both definitions, while the Sudanese Muslim reformer Mahmoud Mohammed Taha or liberal Christians who advocate secularism (such as Ed Davey, Joe Biden, and Barack Obama) only meet the latter. The Liberal Democrats political party in the United Kingdom is secular liberal in philosophy, but its membership is made up of people from many religions and non-religious approaches.

In a modern democratic society, a plurality of conflicting doctrines share an uneasy co-existence within the framework of civilization. Philosophical concepts such as the open society and the veil of ignorance typically underpin the secular liberal's idea of a functioning democratic society where rights and freedoms, including freedom of thought, freedom of religion, and freedom of conscience, are only restricted insofar as they tread on the rights of others.

== Contemporary application ==
=== Arab Spring ===
Secular liberalism is sometimes connected with the Arab Spring protests. One commentator labels it as a "secular liberal fantasy". Others have labeled the motivations behind it, and the temporary governments created as a result as secular liberalism.

Secular liberalism has a long and complicated history in Egypt. The history of secular liberalism was represented in early Egyptian political thought and literature, but the ideas were never effectively put into practice by the Wafd party. Liberal constitutional principles failed to gain a consensus of public opinion and were eventually forced to contend with the political realities of Nasserism. Middle Eastern liberalism, already detached from its Classical philosophical foundation, lacked the economic context in which Western liberalism succeeded, and was effectively replaced by secular authoritarianism in Egypt after the 1952 Egypt Revolution, which dealt more harshly with the Brotherhood. The failures of Nasserism and Pan-Arabism contributed to the growing power of an increasingly violent and radicalized Muslim Brotherhood, further weakening the principles of secularism that had long been challenged by certain political factions within Egypt.

== See also ==
- Age of Enlightenment
- Culture war
- Modernism
- Muscular liberalism
- Postchristianity
- Religious liberalism
- Secular ethics
- Secular humanism
- Secularism
- Secular state
- Secularity
- Secularization
