= Pan-Oceanian =

Ideology espousing unity among people in Oceania

Pan-Oceanian is the proposed unity of Oceania-inhabiting people or a concept that collectively classifies several aspects of Oceanian society. The earlier usages of the term were largely concerned with issues surrounding entomology and other branches of zoology and its derivatives based in Oceania. For example, it categorized the taxonomy or botany of both the onshore and offshore of the Australasia and the nearby Asia-Pacific regions. In subsequent usages, the term is idealized in a manner that connotes a separate continent and the cultural and societal consequences that entails. For example, some Pacific Islanders have indicated that there is a prevalence of depictions of their community that seems to fall in line with stereotypes that were prevalent during the colonial and imperial era. Subsequently, some of these individuals have pushed towards a more inclusive representation of filmmakers and film scholars. In culture, the term is used as an umbrella term in instances where there is a significant overlap in the issues facing Oceanians and in similarities they share, such as with the staples taro and yam.

== See also ==
- List of Oceanian films
