= Sikh feminism =

Feminism and the Sikh religion

Sikhism was founded in Punjab in 1469 by Guru Nanak on the foundations that everyone is equal, regardless of caste, age, or gender. Both men and women are supposed to follow the Five Ks: Kesh (uncut hair), Kangha (comb), Kara (iron bracelet), Kachera (cotton undergarment) and Kirpan (iron dagger), and there was never a distinction between what a woman should be allowed to do versus a man at theological level. Men and women are treated equally in the temple (gurdwara), and everyone eats and prays side-by-side. Both men and women are meant to carry the Kirpan with them as they are responsible for their own physical protection, and should not depend on others. Sikhs are strictly against the caste system and many chose to use Kaur or Singh as a last name to push against the problematic caste system in India. There is only one god (Waheguru) in Sikhism and they are without form or gender, and everyone is equal in the eyes of God. Many Sikh women believe that this absence of assignment of code of conduct for a woman versus a man proves that their religion is historically committed to gender equality. Presently, the culture does not always follow these traditions and equality is often more true in ideals rather than daily practice. According to Kiman Kaur: "It is essential to take into account the diverse Kaur (Sikh women's) narratives in order to critically understand the violence Sikh women experience due to religious, ethnic, and gender minoritization through enabling more intersectional conversations."

In North America the Five Ks are mostly just followed by men; however, many religiously devoted women also choose to commit to Sikh rehni, the Sikh way of life. Many Sikh women also choose to wear a turban as a socio-political move to fight inequality in the religion and show their Sikh essentialism. There are also groups which have been formed by Sikhs, like SAFAR, which are committed to uncovering and challenging oppression within the Sikh community, as well as re-establishing equity in the Sikh culture.

== History ==
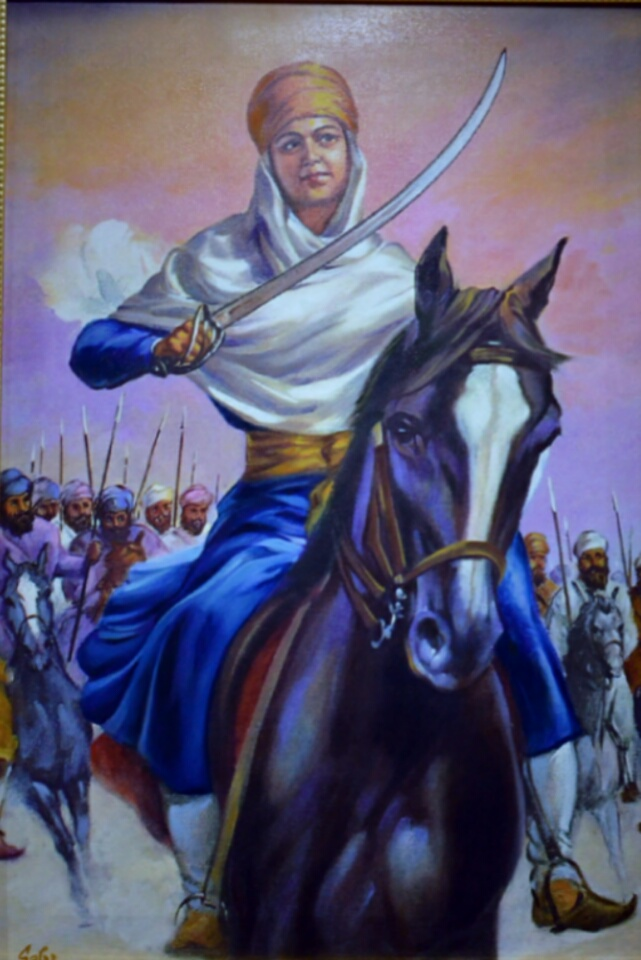
Painting of Mai Bhago leading Sikh warriors into battle

=== Mai Bhago ===
Mai Bhago, also known as Mata Bhag Kaur, was a female Sikh warrior of the early 18th century who led forty men into battle against the Mughal Empire and was the personal bodyguard to Guru Gobind Singh. Bhago is often pictured as a graceful, strong, turbaned woman on a horse, leading in battle. As the story goes, Guru Gobind Singh's army was being hunted down by the Mughal Army. The forty soldiers who were meant to protect the guru were given the option by the Mughal Army to abandon him or be killed. The soldiers told Guru Gobind Singh that they were not his Sikhs and he was not their guru, and went back to their village. One of the soldiers, Nidhan Singh Patti, told his wife, Mai Bhago, what he had done. She became infuriated and told him to do the housework while she went to fight in battle. When the men heard the news that she had gathered all the women in the village to go to the battlefield, they became ashamed and promised to join the battle. Mai Bhago and the soldiers knew it was a suicide mission but wanted to protect their guru, who was hiding in the jungle nearby. Mai Bhago survived, but all of the Sikh soldiers were killed and many from the Mughal Army had also fallen. The remaining Mughal Army assumed that Guru Gobind Singh had been killed and stopped pursuing him. For her faithfulness and gallantry, Mai Bhago then became appointed the guru's bodyguard. As a symbol of her bravery and courage, her spear is now kept alongside Guru Gobind Singh's armour in a gurdwara in Nanded, India.

=== Caste system ===
The caste system is a hierarchical system which distinguishes groups based on social status, rank, wealth, and occupation. Most of India still follows the caste system despite some problematic implications it may have. Sikhs oppose the caste system as it breaks their religious principle of equality. Guru Nanak believed the caste system to be evil and challenged the institution by saying manas ki jat sabhe eke paihcanbo – 'recognise all of mankind as a single caste of humanity.' Many Sikhs have dropped their caste name and have chosen to take the surname of Kaur (middle name for all female Sikhs) or Singh (middle name for all male Sikhs). This dropping of the castes became problematic for some Sikhs who first tried to immigrate to Canada, as the immigration office did not legally recognize Singh or Kaur as last names because they were "too common". The World Sikh Organization was outraged by this law as it required Sikh families to take back their caste names, thereby going against their faith. The World Sikh Organization was able to prove that there were several other immigrants who had common last names but were not forced to change their name. The policy was immediately reversed and was ruled a misunderstanding.

== Issues ==
=== Equality in the temple (Gurdwara) ===
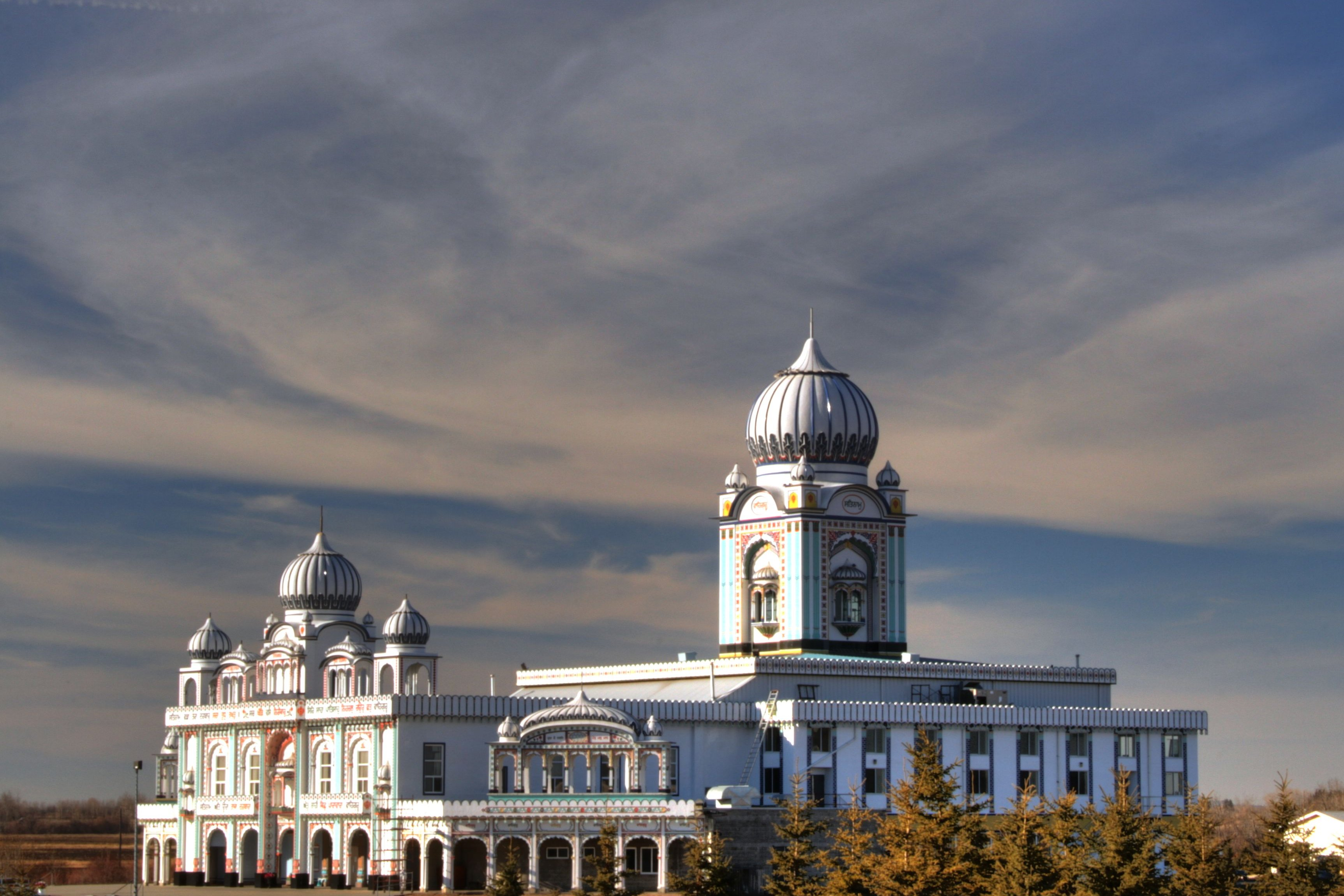
Nanaksar Gurdwara: Sikh Temple on Horsehills Road in Edmonton, Alberata, Canada.

Any man or woman is welcome in the temple and accepted in all prayers and recitations of the Guru Granth Sahib, the primary Sikh scripture. Every temple has a langar (kitchen) where people of any gender and from any faith, ethnicity or cultural background are welcome to a free vegetarian meal. Everyone eats on the floor together to show social equality. Despite the fact that it is not prohibited for men and women to sit together, traditionally they still sit on opposite sides of the congregation in the Darbar Sahib Hall (main hall), both equal distances from the Guru Granth Sahib. Sikh scriptures are usually publicly recited by men and generally only men address the congregation. Though anyone can be a granthi (ceremonial reader), the long hours and social restrictions surrounding the job make it less conducive for a woman as she is generally also required to take care of her children. Women are often the caregivers or cooks, while men read from the Guru Granth Sahib. The lack of accessibility and encouragement for women to apply to be a granthi creates inequality within the temple and discourages the possibility for change.

Homosexuality was never explicitly mentioned in the Guru Granth Sahib, but marriage between man and woman is repeatedly encouraged. Sikhism has no specific teachings about homosexuality and the Sikh holy scripture, the Guru Granth Sahib, does not explicitly mention heterosexuality, homosexuality or bisexuality. Many have opened this up to interpretation, but it is argued that the guru's teachings were based on the ground of equality for all and homosexuality is no exception.

=== Abortion in India ===
All forms of sex selection are condemned by the majority of Sikhs based on the teachings of the Guru Granth Sahib, which was committed to the equality of all. The use of feticide is considered by most Sikhs to be an act of discrimination and violence. However, many people in India continue to use feticide and abort female fetuses as males are more desirable and favoured in Indian culture. Boys are more desirable for several reasons, including earning power, potential pensions and dowry. In Lohri, a Punjabi festival which marks winter solstice and celebrates life, only the birth of new sons is celebrated. In Canada, women born in India who have already given birth to two daughters, gave birth to 192 baby boys in Ontario for every 100 girls. In Punjab (the homeland of the Sikhs), in 2001, there were only 754 girls born for every 1000 boys. However, these discrepancies are improving and the ratios between men and women are becoming more even.

== Hair politics ==
=== History of the turban ===
When Sikhism was first founded in 1469, the turban was mostly worn by spiritual leaders and Gurus as a status symbol, and uncut hair was a symbol of holiness and spiritual power. During a time of turmoil and war in India, the 10th Guru, Guru Gobind Singh, brought his people together and formed Khalsa (the pure), a spiritually devoted, brother-and-sisterhood of baptized Sikhs, and from there asked his people to follow the Five Ks. The most distinctive and widely recognizable of the Five Ks is Kesh, which requires Sikh men and women to keep their hair uncut. The turban symbolized spiritual strength, military readiness and allowed Sikhs to be unified and differentiated from others. Guru Gobind Singh wanted to reinforce that in God's eyes, all Sikhs were notable and equal. This created an army of men and women committed to attaining spiritual and temporal liberation under God.

==== Turbaned woman ====
Historically, men and women were meant to follow Kesh and both committed to having uncut hair. However, culturally, mostly men wear turbans, while women traditionally leave their uncut hair down. In turn, the turban is considered to be a masculine symbol and if a woman chooses to wear a turban, it is misunderstood by the Sikh community as a rejection of feminine traditions. Many turbaned Sikh women consider the wearing of the turban to be a post-colonial, feminist choice, which pushes against assimilation and allows them to show their Sikh essentialism. There is a sense of dignity, respect, power, and bravery which comes from gurus and Sikh warriors having historically worn the turban. By wearing the turban, Sikh women are able to present themselves as strong and faithfully proud. Wearing the turban allows Sikh women to be easily identified as Sikh and differentiates them from those of Hindu faith. The turban allows women to reclaim equality and respect within the Sikh religion.

===== Palbinder Kaur Shergill =====
Palbinder Kaur Shergill is the first turbaned Sikh woman to be appointed as a judge in Canada. Shergill was born in Punjab, India and raised in Williams Lake, BC. She is a leading human-rights advocate and her extended family in Jalandhar, India, runs a non-profit computer and stitching centre for the poor. Shergill has provided pro-bono legal council to the World Sikh Organization (WSO) and has represented the WSO for several cases, including the right for Sikh youth to wear the Kirpan in schools. Previously to being appointed judge, Shergill ran her own boutique law firm in Surrey, BC. Shergill is an advisory board member on the Sikh Feminist Research Institute (SAFAR), and in 2012, was appointed Queen's Counsel for her community services. Jody Wilson-Raybould, the minister of justice and attorney general in Canada, appointed Shergill as judge for her human rights advocacy and leadership positions.

===== Wearing a turban in the RCMP =====
In 1988, a young Sikh man, Baltej Singh Dhillon, was recruited by the RCMP but was told if he wanted to work for them, he had to remove his turban. Dhillon refused, but the RCMP refused to change their rules, and in return denied him a post. In 1990, the government decided the ban was against the Canadian Charter of Rights and Freedoms, and enabled Dhillon to join the forces, which eventually turned into a long successful career for him. This sparked a political turmoil and groups like Alberta's Defenders of RCMP Tradition appeared, collecting more than 150,000 signatures opposing turbans in the RCMP. There were several failed right-winged attempts to change the law, and eventually the movement faded over time.

== Sikh Feminist Research Institute ==
The Sikh Feminist Research Institute (SAFAR) is a non-profit organization based in North America committed to Sikh feminist research and activism. It was started in 2010 in Toronto, Canada, by Sikh women devoted to equality and education. Currently, they have programs all over Canada and hold conferences all over North America. They have four different programs which are committed to creating social equity through active conversation; these programs are:

- Our Journey Conference Series: This conference series explores several topics, relationships and practices through the viewpoint of Sikh feminists. The series is intended to create critical dialogue and engaging conversation about Sikhism and feminism.
- Young Women's Leadership Conference Series: SAFAR teams up with schools to create a space for conversation and networking between young Sikh women and Sikh women leaders.
- Kaurs Talk Politics: Kaurs Talk Politics (KTP) provides a space for Sikh women (Kaurs) to challenge Sikh history, and empower themselves through reclamation of socio-political agency and Sikh commitment to equality.
- Book Club: the book club creates an online space for Sikh feminists to read, reflect and discuss the revolution of the Vasaikhi and its continued implications to equality, gender, and social and humanitarian justice.

These programs create safe spaces for people to have conversations about politics and religion through a Sikh feminist perspective. Through their website, they also provide a valuable list of Sikh feminist reading material, as well as articles written by them and about them. Their articles are intended to challenge oppression and provide valuable information about Sikh movements, people, and history.

== See also ==
- Sophia Duleep Singh
- Sikh feminists
