= Ecoauthoritarianism =

Political ideology combining environmental protection with authoritarian governance

Ecoauthoritarianism (also known as an eco-dictatorship or authoritarian environmentalism) is a political ideology which attempts to reconcile both environmentalist and authoritarian tendencies. It is justified by the belief of the inevitability and necessity of a strong central government to preserve the environment.

== Characteristics ==
In 2010, political scientist Mark Beeson defined "ecoauthoritarianism" as "the decrease in individual liberty as governments seek to transform environmentally destructive behaviour." Unlike ecofascism, ecoauthoritarianism can be utilized by both the left and right wing.

According to political economist Justus Enninga, eco-authoritarianism rests on three ideas: individuals who are left unchecked will cause environmental crises, liberal democratic societies will fail to sufficiently limit the autonomy of individuals to prevent ecological crises, and it is more efficient for those who understand what needs to be done to take control without democratic approval.

Proponents of ecoauthoritarianism generally tend to critique democratic measures by which environmental sustainability can be preserved, citing that an authoritarian governmental system would be consequentially more preferable than the preservation of individual liberties and human rights through liberal pathways. The common denominator in ecoauthoritarian thought is the focus on environmental sustainability and the belief that political plurality is incompatible with the attainment of this sustainability. Though other regime types are imaginable, the majority of scholars suggest a meritocratic system. Instead of a democratic rule, politicians would be chosen according to their expertise.

Within green political thought, ecoauthoritarianism is marginal. Ecoauthoritarianism was inspired by The Limits to Growth and its conclusion that there are physical limits to growth and that without dramatic changes in all areas of life, Earth is doomed to become uninhabitable. Newer ecoauthoritarian thought underlines the tradeoffs and illegitimacy of unsustainable politics in a democracy. It argues that democracy cannot be an absolute, since sustainability is a precondition for everything valuable. It contends that the overexploitation of resources, given its consequences, must be considered as violence and that in fact, many issues cannot and should not be subject to democratic decision making. There are many instances where the state already interferes and where interference is essential for public safety.

Ecoauthoritarian sentiment represents a small but growing position in environmental policy literature among those who believe democracy is an inadequate system to ensure ecological stability. Especially, the recent leaps taken by the Chinese government are seen by some scholars as evidence for the superior potential of autocratic governments when it comes to implementing good environmental governance.

Researchers Chen Xiang and Alex Y. Lo described China's environmental governance as "authoritarian environmentalism 2.0", which is characterized by increased centralization alongside greater use of market-based mechanisms and controlled public participation.

== Criticism ==
Eco-authoritarian solutions remain a fringe, controversial position among academics and policymakers. Critiques of ecoauthoritarianism interrogate both the ethics and utility of authoritarianism as an environmental protection strategy.

=== Ethics ===
Though effective at curtailing environmental degradation and spurring large-scale reforestation, the People's Republic of China's 2010's forest reform resulted in widespread energy poverty and mass unemployment in rural Chinese communities. Geographers studying this reform argue that even environmentally "successful" eco-authoritarian policy may fall well short of just transition, incurring significant social injustice and institutional violence.

=== Utility ===
Beginning in the early 1980s, the Egyptian government pursued a strategy of robust conservation in the Sinai desert, establishing protections for many of that region's unique ecosystems. The centralization of the Egyptian state under the executive branch, and president Hosni Mubarak, was widely cited as a key factor in the speed and comprehensiveness of the conservation push. However, in the early 2000s, in the face of tourism and economic pressures, the same government was responsible for the removal of environmental protections and the promotion of development on the peninsula. Some environmental scientists cite the Sinai example to demonstrate how, unhindered by institutional inertia, authoritarian governments may capriciously pursue - then abandon - environmentalist ventures when they lose interest.

David Shearman, author of The Climate Change Challenge and the Failure of Democracy, argues that eco-authoritarian states would require the rise of an ecologically and scientifically literate oligarchy, or "eco-elite," to control government policy. Expanding on that claim, ethicists argue that the governing and policymaking capability of said class would be difficult to guarantee, and regardless impossible to maintain over generations. The necessary insularity of the "eco-elite" as a class would have immediate negative implications for governance; absent democratic feedback channels, information flows leveraged by the government could turn inward, creating feedback loops and depriving the state of the ability to properly monitor the social and environmental conditions it operates in.

== See also ==
- Deep ecology
- Ecofascism
- Eco-nationalism
- Green Imperialism
