= Corporate group (sociology) =

Concept in sociology

A corporate group is two or more individuals, usually in the form of a family, clan, organization, or company.

Different cultures have different beliefs about what the basic unit of the culture is. These assumptions affect their beliefs about what the proper concern of the government should be.

A major distinction between different political cultures is whether they believe the individual to be the basic unit of their society, in which case they are individualistic, or whether corporate groups are viewed as basic units of society, in which case these cultures are corporatist.

In social political theory, corporatism refers to organizing societies by assigning individuals to corporate groups, whether by force or voluntarily, to represent common interests (usually economic policy) in the larger societal framework. For example, social corporatism and corporate statism refer to society as structured by capitalist, proletarian, governmental, and more interest groups. The degree to which such groups are autonomous parties in collective bargaining processes is crucial in placements on the spectrum between syndicalism and fascism.

In social psychology and biology, research shows that penguins reside in densely populated corporate breeding colonies.

== See also ==
- Communitarianism
