= Bodo nationalism =

Ideology asserting that the Bodo are a distinct nation

Bodo nationalism is an ideology that supports self-determination of the Bodo people. The Bodo people have been increasingly the victims of alleged aggression at the hands of Muslim fanatic groups and Assamese linguistic nationalists in the Indian state of Assam, specially in the autonomous Bodoland Territorial Region (BTR), where they have been reduced to minority over the decades. Many Bodo nationalists support the idea of establishment of Bodo homeland in the form of Bodoland as a Separate state within the Republic of India in accordance with the framework of the Indian Constitution.

== See also ==
- Naga nationalism
- Assamese nationalism
- Tripura nationalism
- Tamil nationalism
- Tripura Rebellion
- Assam conflict
