= Nashism =

Post-Soviet Russian political neologism

Nashism (Russian: нашизм) and Nashists are post-Soviet Russian political neologisms derived from the word "наши" ("[those who are] ours", i.e., those of the ingroup). The word is used to refer to various forms of worldview based on the primacy of "ours" over the "outsiders" (comparable to la cosa nostra, "our thing"). Various Russian journalists, politicians and political scientists define this word differently, as described below. The words "nashists" and "nashism" have also been used in reference to the Nashi political movement with the word "ours" in its title.

== Nevzorov's "Nashi" ==
The word was coined by Alexander Nevzorov, the anchor of the Russian TV program 600 Seconds. In January 1991 Nevzorov produced a documentary and a controversial series of TV reports from Vilnius titled Ours (Nashi), about the actions of the Soviet spetsnaz during the January Events, when the Soviet military forces attempted to crush the declared independence of Lithuania, in which Nevzorov was markedly sympathetic to Soviet actions. As a freelance journalist Jules Evans wrote, reporting from the Soviet Union:

"the journalist Aleksander Nevzorov appeared on TV, standing in front of the demonstrators in Lithuania holding a Kalashnikov. To the music of Richard Wagner (a German), Nevzorov declared the birth of a new Idea – ‘Nashi’. “Nashi is a circle of people – let it be enormous, colossal, multimillions – to whom one is related by common language, blood, and motherland.”

In November 1991 Nevzorov established the People's Liberation Movement "Nashi", which he defined as "a united front of resistance to the anti-national politics of the current administration of Russia and other Union Republics of the former USSR". Its badge contained the contour of the USSR with the words "НАШИ" (ours) within. Of prominent participants in the movement was Viktor Alksnis. Nevzorov's "Nashi" was short-lived. The naturally coined word "Nashists" in reference to the supporters of the "Nashi" movement immediately invoked the rhyme with the word "fascists", as a hint to the imperial position of the movement in support of the indivisibility of the Soviet Union, in particular, their justification of the use of military force to this end.

== Youth Movement "Nashi" ==
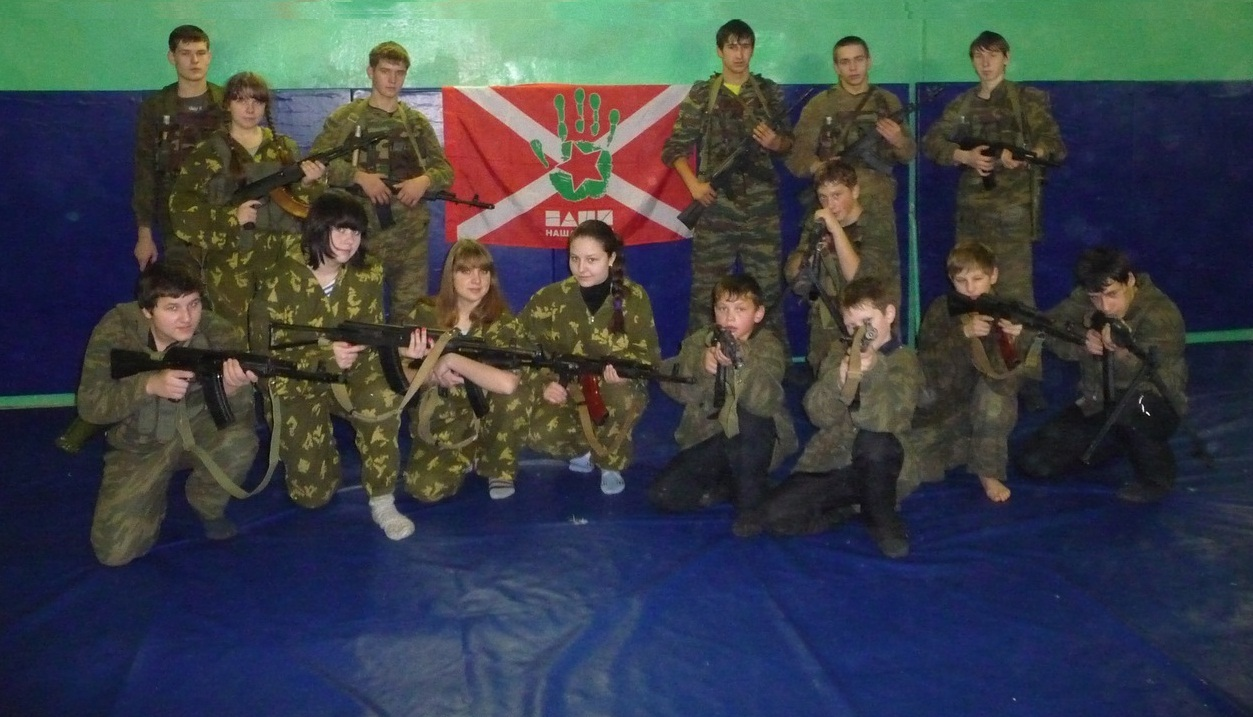
"Nasha Army" youth military troops in Smolensk, near Belarus.

The pun "nashism/fascism" is often used by the political opponents of "Nashi". In particular, it was liberally used after the anti-Estonian manifestations of "Nashi" in relation to the events around the Bronze Soldier of Tallinn. A popular anti-Nashi slogan is "Nashism Shall Not Pass!" ("Нашизм не пройдет!"), an adaptation of the slogan "They shall not pass".

== Corporatism ==
Andrei Illarionov describes the emerging corporatism in Russia as power in hands of Silovik power structures, the current incarnation of Chekism, whose ideology he defines by the word "nashism" ("ours-ism") in its most general sense: preferential treatment of "ours". In an article initially printed in Kommersant and then reprinted several times in the West, he writes:

"Ours-ism" does not know national or ethnic boundaries. The former chancellor of a foreign country [Gerhard Schröder] is made a member of the corporation and becomes "our man in Europe." Meanwhile, a Russian businessman [Mikhail Khodorkovsky] who created a company that brought billions into the national treasury turns out to be an "other" and is exiled to the depths of Siberia.

== See also ==
- Ruscism
