= Blatcherism =

Portmanteau of the names of two British politicians

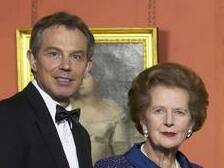
Margaret Thatcher, right, and Tony Blair, left, pictured together in 2002.

Blatcherism is a term formed as a portmanteau of the names of two British prime ministers, Tony Blair (Labour Party) and Margaret Thatcher (Conservative Party). It has been used by critics of economic liberalism and monetarism to refer to the thesis that a policy model of the Thatcher government, distinct from one-nation conservatism, was resurrected when Blair came to power. It echoed "Butskellism" (portmanteau of Butler and Gaitskell), frequently used to describe the post-war consensus on a mixed economy with moderate state intervention to promote social goals, particularly in education and health.

Editorial comment by Red Pepper before the 1997 general election that brought Blair to power may be the earliest usage. Another early sighting of this term was in 2001, used by Brian Lee Crowley, a Canadian commentator. The term has also been used, for example, by the journalist Alexander Cockburn in preference to Blairism.

== Definition ==
Blatcherism can be defined as an emphasis on free market policies, support for privatization or the private ownership of former public services, a monetarist/neo-classical economic policy and a retention of anti-trade union legislation. A convergence of such policies between the Labour and Conservative parties first emerged when Blair became leader of the Labour Party in July 1994 following the sudden death of his predecessor, John Smith. Under Blair's leadership, the party abandoned many policies it had held for decades and embraced many of the measures enacted during Thatcher's tenure as prime minister, including the deregulatory Building Societies Act 1986. In conjunction with Peter Mandelson, Gordon Brown and Alastair Campbell, Blair created the New Labour ethos by embracing many aspects of Thatcherite beliefs into Labour as the "Third Way".
