= Producerism =

Belief that workers benefit society more than those who get wealth through other means

Producerism is an ideology which holds that those members of society engaged in the production of tangible wealth are of greater benefit to society than, for example, aristocrats who inherit their wealth and status.

== History ==
Robert Ascher traces the history of producerism back as early as the Diggers in the 1640s. This outlook was not widespread among artisans of the time because they owed their livelihoods to the patronage of the aristocracy, but by the time of the American Revolution, the producerist view was dominant among American artisans.

Rosanne Currarino identifies two varieties of producerism in the mid-19th century: "proprietary producerism", which is popular among self-employed farmers and urban artisans, and "industrial producerism", which spoke to wage-laborers and is identified in particular with the Knights of Labor and the rise of socialism.

For some commentators, the Pullman Strike of 1894, led by Eugene V. Debs, was a high-water mark in the history of American producerism.

In the United Kingdom, producerism was historically influential in the Liberal Party, especially its Radical wing, until the early 20th century, pitting "the many against the few" – i.e. the working and middle classes against the landed aristocracy, expressed in support of ideas such as the single land tax advocated by Georgists.

== Modern-day producerism ==
Producerism has seen a contemporary revival, sparked by popular opposition to the machinations of globalized financial capital and large, politically connected corporations. Critics of producerism see a correlation between producerist views and views that are antagonistic toward lower-income people and immigrants, such as nativism. These critics see producerism as analogous to populism. Examples of politicians or groups that are cited by these critics include the Reform Party of the United States of America, Ross Perot, Pat Buchanan, Lou Dobbs, and Donald Trump in the United States, as well as Jean-Marie Le Pen in France, Björn Höcke in Germany, and similar politicians across Europe.

== See also ==
- Elitism, the belief that the social rank of people roughly reflects their value to society.
- Georgism, an economic philosophy holding that people should own only the value they produce themselves
- Labor theory of value, the principle that economic value is determined by the socially necessary labor required to produce it
- Petite bourgeoisie, a social class within the bourgeoisie at its lower end
- Populism, a political approach that mobilizes the animosity of the "commoner" against "privileged elites"
- Surplus value, the profit of businesses achieved by paying workers less than the sale price of the product of their labor
- Welfare chauvinism, the belief that social welfare should be tied to nationalism
- Work ethic, the belief that hard work and diligence have a moral benefit
- Working class, all people in a society who are employed for wages
