= Presidency of Calvin Coolidge =

U.S presidential administration from 1923 to 1929

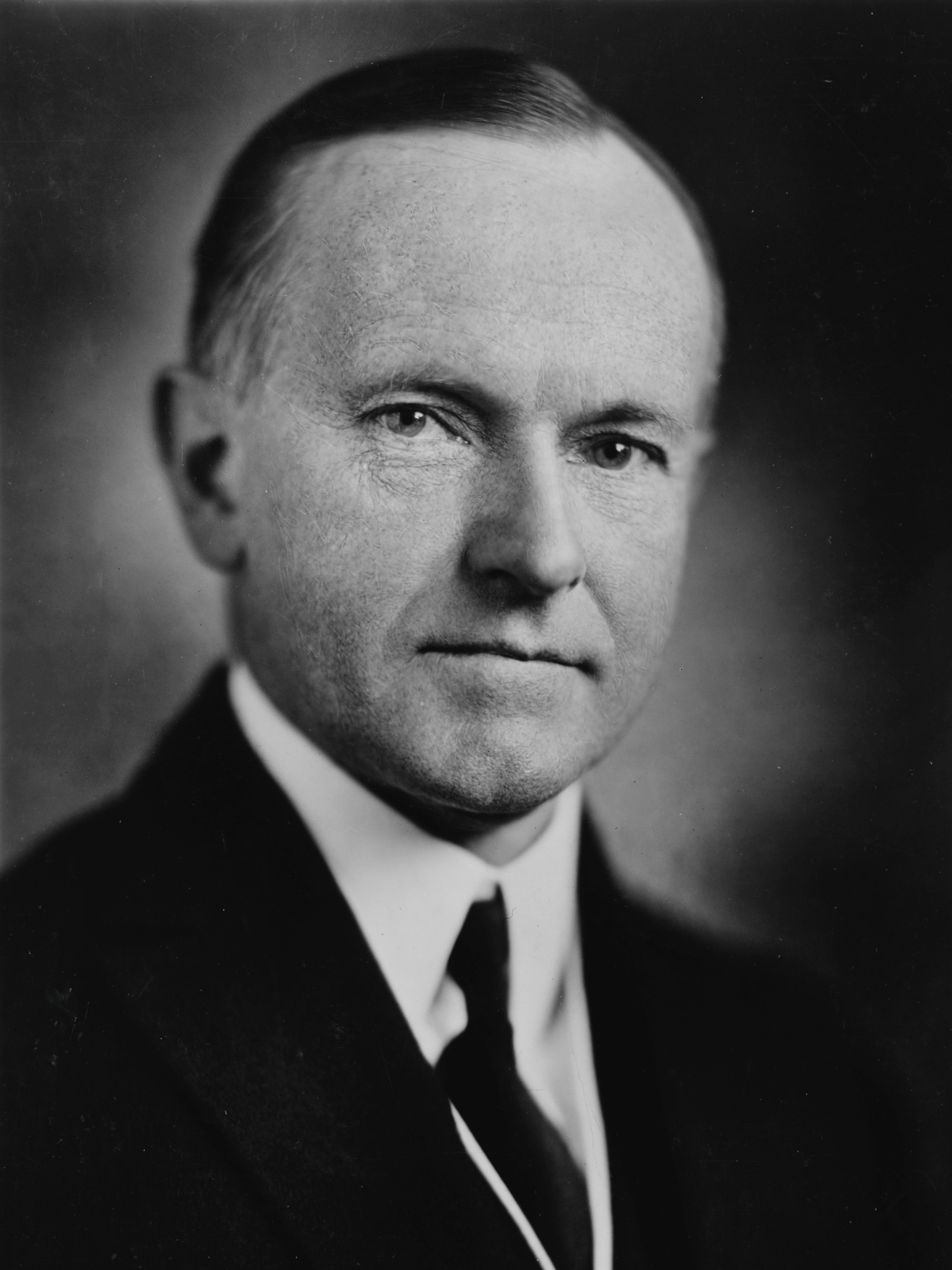
- Presidency of Calvin Coolidge; August 2, 1923 – March 4, 1929
- Vice President: None (1923–1925) (Note: Coolidge was vice president under Warren G. Harding and became president upon Harding's death on August 2, 1923. As this was prior to the adoption of the Twenty-fifth Amendment to the United States Constitution in 1967, a vacancy in the office of vice president was not filled until the next ensuing election and inauguration.); Charles G. Dawes (1925–1929)
- Cabinet: See list
- Party: Republican
- Election: 1924
- Seat: White House
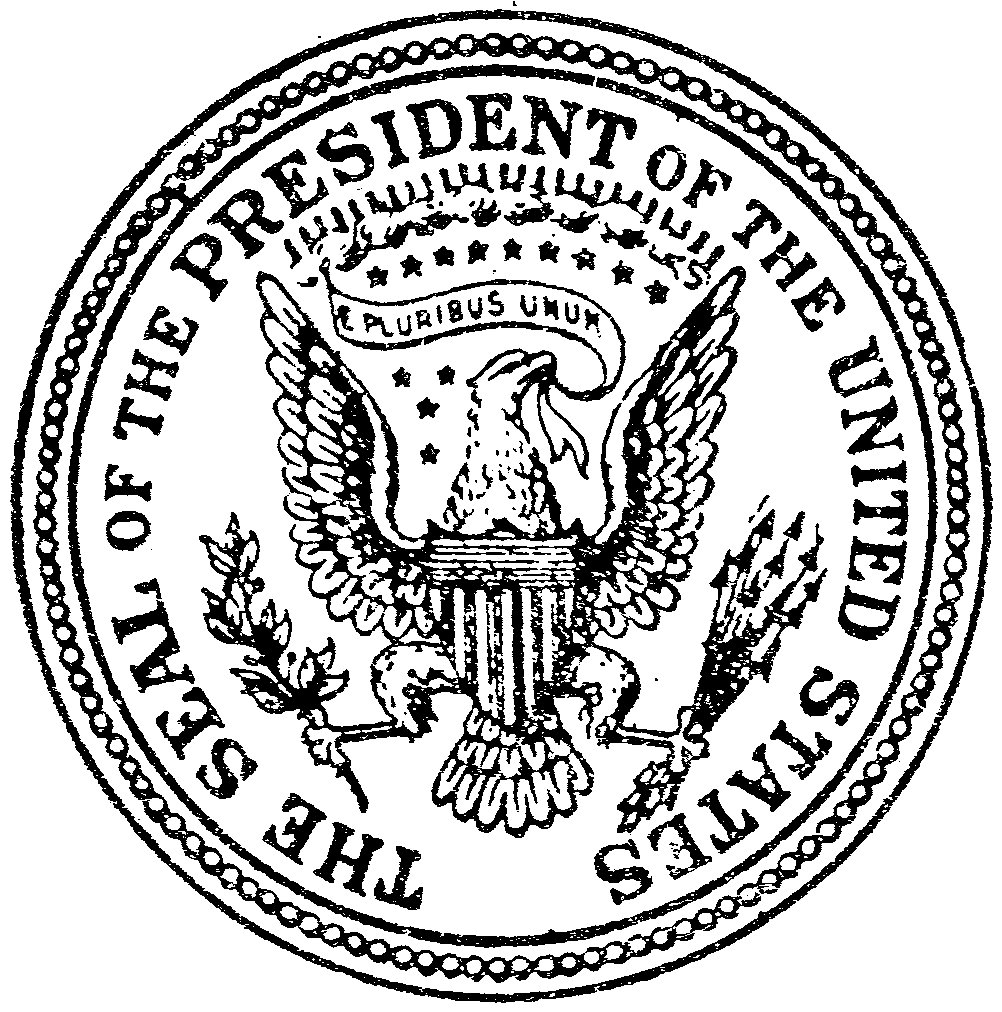
- Seal of the president (1894–1945)

Calvin Coolidge's tenure as the 30th president of the United States began on August 2, 1923, when Coolidge became president upon Warren G. Harding's death, and ended on March 4, 1929. A Republican from Massachusetts, Coolidge had been vice president for 2 years, 151 days when he succeeded to the presidency upon the sudden death of Harding. Elected to a full four–year term in 1924, Coolidge gained a reputation as a small-government conservative. Coolidge was succeeded by former Secretary of Commerce Herbert Hoover after the 1928 presidential election.

Coolidge adeptly handled the aftermath of several Harding administration scandals, and by the end of 1924 he had dismissed most officials implicated in the scandals. He presided over a strong economy and sought to shrink the regulatory role of the federal government. Along with Secretary of the Treasury Andrew Mellon, Coolidge won the passage of three major tax cuts. Using powers delegated to him by the 1922 Fordney–McCumber Tariff, Coolidge kept tariff rates high in order to protect American manufacturing profits and high wages. He blocked passage of the McNary–Haugen Farm Relief Bill, which would have involved the federal government in the persistent farm crisis by raising prices paid to farmers for five crops. The strong economy combined with restrained government spending produced consistent government surpluses, and total federal debt shrank by one quarter during Coolidge's presidency. Coolidge also signed the Immigration Act of 1924, which greatly restricted immigration into the United States. In foreign policy, Coolidge continued to keep the United States out of membership or major engagement with the League of Nations. However he supported disarmament agreements and sponsored the Kellogg–Briand Pact of 1928 to outlaw most wars.

Coolidge was greatly admired during his time in office, and he surprised many by declining to seek another term. Public opinion on Coolidge soured shortly after he left office as the nation plunged into the Great Depression. Many linked the nation's economic collapse to Coolidge's policy decisions, which did nothing to discourage the wild speculation that was going on and rendered so many vulnerable to economic ruin. Though his reputation underwent a renaissance during the Ronald Reagan administration, modern assessments of Coolidge's presidency are divided. He is adulated among advocates of smaller government and laissez-faire; supporters of an active central government generally view him less favorably.

== Accession ==
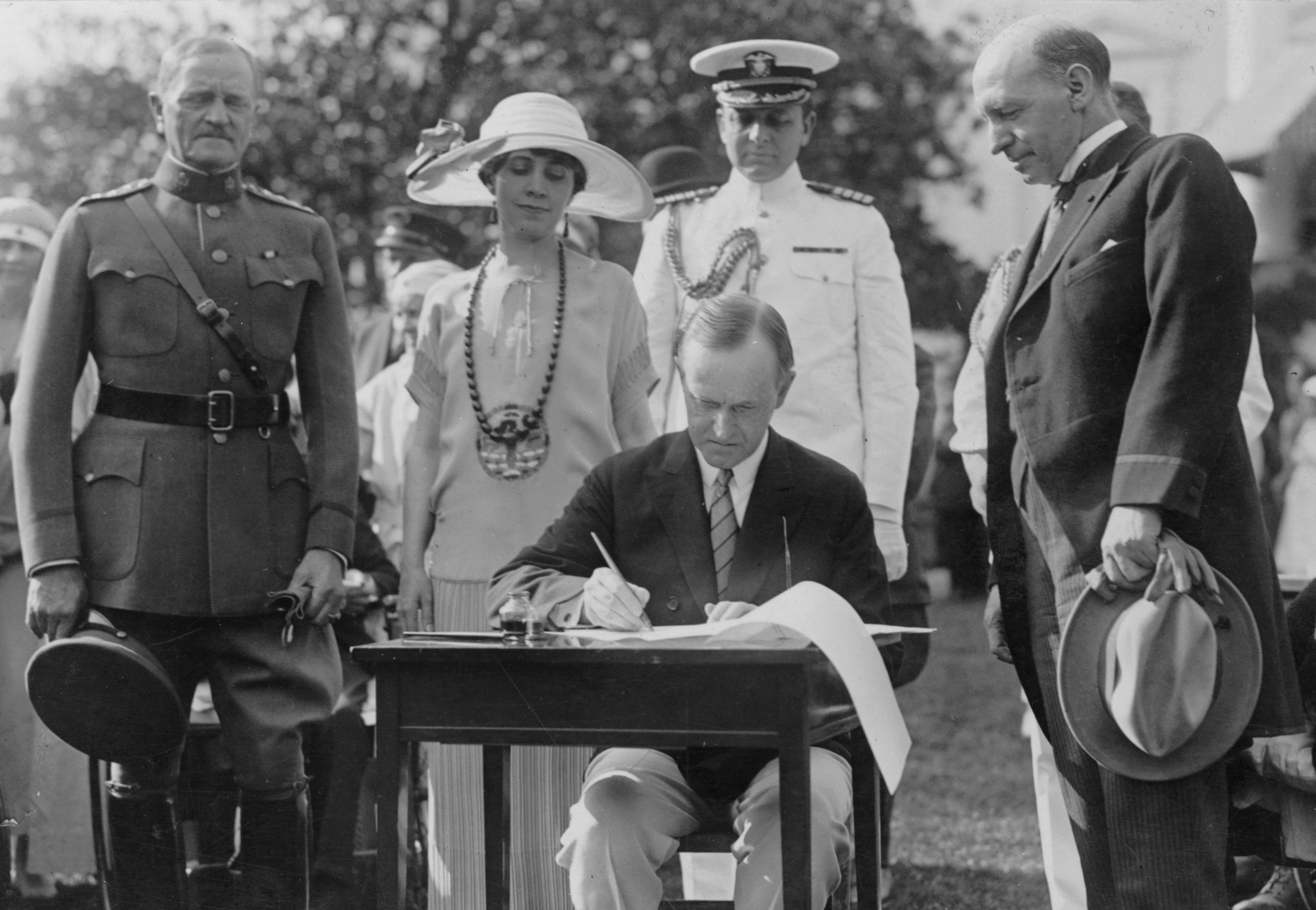
Coolidge signing several bills as General John J. Pershing looks on

Coolidge, who served as the governor of Massachusetts from 1919 through 1921 was nominated at the 1920 Republican National Convention for the ticket of Warren G. Harding for president and Coolidge for vice president. Coolidge became the Vice President of the United States on March 4, 1921, after the Republican ticket was victorious in the 1920 presidential election. On August 2, 1923, President Harding died unexpectedly while on a speaking tour of the Western United States. Vice President Coolidge was visiting his family home in Vermont when he received word by a messenger of Harding's death. Coolidge's father, a notary public, administered the oath of office in the family parlor at 2:47 a.m. on August 3, 1923. The following day, Coolidge traveled to Washington, D.C., where he was sworn in again by Justice Adolph A. Hoehling Jr. of the Supreme Court of the District of Columbia. Coolidge addressed Congress when it reconvened on December 6, 1923, expressing support for many of Harding's policies, including Harding's formal budgeting process and the enforcement of immigration restrictions.

== Administration ==
Coolidge cabinet
Office	Name	Term
President	Calvin Coolidge	1923–1929
Vice President	none	1923–1925
Charles G. Dawes	1925–1929
Secretary of State	Charles Evans Hughes	1923–1925
Frank B. Kellogg	1925–1929
Secretary of the Treasury	Andrew Mellon	1923–1929
Secretary of War	John W. Weeks	1923–1925
Dwight F. Davis	1925–1929
Attorney General	Harry M. Daugherty	1923–1924
Harlan F. Stone	1924–1925
John G. Sargent	1925–1929
Postmaster General	Harry S. New	1923–1929
Secretary of the Navy	Edwin Denby	1923–1924
Curtis D. Wilbur	1924–1929
Secretary of the Interior	Hubert Work	1923–1928
Roy Owen West	1928–1929
Secretary of Agriculture	Henry Cantwell Wallace	1923–1924
Howard Mason Gore	1924–1925
William Marion Jardine	1925–1929
Secretary of Commerce	Herbert Hoover	1923–1928
William F. Whiting	1928–1929
Secretary of Labor	James J. Davis	1923–1929

Although a few of Harding's cabinet appointees were scandal-tarred, Coolidge initially retained all of them out of an ardent conviction that, as successor to a deceased elected president, he was obligated to retain his predecessor's counselors and policies until the next election. He kept Harding's able speechwriter Judson T. Welliver; Stuart Crawford replaced Welliver in November 1925. Coolidge appointed C. Bascom Slemp, a Virginia Congressman and experienced federal politician, to work jointly with Edward T. Clark, a Massachusetts Republican organizer whom he retained from his vice-presidential staff, as Secretaries to the President (a position equivalent to the modern White House Chief of Staff).

Perhaps the most powerful person in Coolidge's Cabinet was Secretary of the Treasury Andrew Mellon, who controlled the administration's financial policies and was regarded by many, including House Minority Leader John Nance Garner, as more powerful than Coolidge himself. Secretary of Commerce Herbert Hoover also held a prominent place in Coolidge's Cabinet, in part because Coolidge found value in Hoover's ability to win positive publicity with his pro-business proposals. Secretary of State Charles Evans Hughes directed Coolidge's foreign policy until he resigned in 1925 following Coolidge's re-election. He was replaced by Frank B. Kellogg, who had previously served as a senator and as the ambassador to Great Britain. Coolidge made two other appointments following his re-election, with William M. Jardine taking the position of Secretary of Agriculture and John G. Sargent becoming Attorney General. Coolidge appointed Sargent only after the Senate rejected his first choice, Charles B. Warren, who was the first Cabinet nominee to be rejected by the Senate since 1868. Coolidge did not have a vice president during his first term, but Charles Dawes became vice president at the start of Coolidge's second term. Dawes and Coolidge clashed over farm policy and other issues.

== Judicial appointments ==
Coolidge appointed only Harlan Fiske Stone to the Supreme Court of the United States. Stone was Coolidge's fellow Amherst alumnus, a Wall Street lawyer, and a conservative Republican. Stone was serving as dean of Columbia Law School when Coolidge appointed him to be attorney general in 1924 to restore the reputation tarnished by Harding's Attorney General, Harry M. Daugherty. Stone proved to be a firm believer in judicial restraint and was regarded as one of the court's three liberal justices who would often vote to uphold New Deal legislation.

Coolidge nominated 17 judges to the United States Courts of Appeals, and 61 judges to the United States district courts. He appointed Genevieve R. Cline to the United States Customs Court, making Cline the first woman to serve in the federal judiciary. Coolidge also signed the Judiciary Act of 1925 into law, allowing the Supreme Court more discretion over its workload.

== Domestic affairs ==
=== Harding administration scandals ===
In the waning days of Harding's administration, several scandals had begun to emerge into public view. Though Coolidge was not implicated in any corrupt dealings, he was faced with the fallout of the scandals in the early days of his presidency. The Teapot Dome Scandal tainted the careers of former Secretary of the Interior Albert B. Fall (who had resigned in March 1923) and Secretary of the Navy Edwin Denby, and additional scandals implicated Attorney General Harry M. Daugherty and former Veterans Bureau director Charles R. Forbes. A bipartisan Senate investigation led by Thomas J. Walsh and Robert LaFolette began just weeks into Coolidge's presidency. As the investigation uncovered further misconduct, Coolidge appointed Atlee Pomerene and Owen Roberts as special prosecutors, but he remained personally unconvinced as to the guilt of Harding's appointees. Despite congressional pressure, he refused to dismiss Denby, who instead resigned of his own accord in March 1924. That same month, after Daugherty refused to resign, Coolidge fired him. Coolidge also replaced the Director of the Bureau of Investigation, William J. Burns, with J. Edgar Hoover. The investigation by Pomerene and Roberts, combined with the departure of the scandal-tarred Harding appointees, served to disassociate Coolidge from the Harding administration's misdeeds. By May 1924, Harding's scandals had largely receded from public attention, though a separate scandal involving former Postmaster General Will H. Hays would briefly garner headlines in 1928.

=== Economy and regulation ===
It is probable that a press which maintains an intimate touch with the business currents of the nation is likely to be more reliable than it would be if it were a stranger to these influences. After all, the chief business of the American people is business. They are profoundly concerned with buying, selling, investing and prospering in the world. (emphasis added)
President Calvin Coolidge's address to the American Society of Newspaper Editors, Washington D.C., January 25, 1925

During Coolidge's presidency, the United States experienced a period of rapid economic growth known as the "Roaring Twenties." Unemployment remained low while the country's gross domestic product rose from $85.2 billion in 1924 to $101.4 in 1929. According to Nathan Miller, "the postwar years ushered in an age of consumerism with a broader base of participation than had ever existed before in America or anywhere else." The number of automobiles in the United States increased from 7 million in 1919 to 23 million in 1929, while the percentage of households with electricity rose from 16 percent in 1912 to 60 percent in the mid-1920s.

The regulatory state under Coolidge was, as one biographer described it, "thin to the point of invisibility." Coolidge believed that promoting the interests of manufacturers was good for society as a whole, and he sought to reduce taxes and regulations on businesses while imposing tariffs to protect those interests against foreign competition. Coolidge demonstrated his disdain for regulation by appointing commissioners to the Federal Trade Commission (FTC) and the Interstate Commerce Commission who did little to restrict the activities of businesses under their jurisdiction. Under leadership of Chairman William E. Humphrey, a Coolidge appointee, the FTC largely stopped prosecuting anti-trust cases, allowing companies like Alcoa to dominate entire industries. Coolidge also avoided interfering with the workings of the Federal Reserve, which kept interest rates low and allowed for the expansion of margin trading in the stock market. The 1922 Fordney–McCumber Tariff allowed the president some leeway in determining tariff rates, and Coolidge used his power to raise the already-high rates set by Fordney–McCumber. He also staffed the United States Tariff Commission, a board that advised the president on tariff rates, with businessmen who favored high tariffs.

Secretary of Commerce Hoover energetically used government auspices to promote business efficiency and develop new industries like air travel and radio. Hoover was a strong proponent of cooperation between government and business, and he organized numerous conferences of intellectuals and businessmen which made various recommendations. Relatively few reforms were passed, but the proposals created the image of an active administration. Between 1923 and 1929, the number of families with radios grew from 300,000 (or approximately 1 percent) to 10 million, which grew further to a majority of U.S. households by 1931 and 75 percent of U.S. households by 1937. The Radio Act of 1927 established the Federal Radio Commission (FRC) under the auspices of the Commerce Department, and the FRC granted numerous licenses to large, commercial radio stations that demonstrated that they served "the public interest, convenience, or necessity", and the Act also established the equal-time rule for radio broadcasters in the United States. At Hoover's request, Congress passed the Air Commerce Act, which granted the Commerce Department the authority to regulate air travel. The Coolidge administration provided matching funds for roads under the authorization of the Federal Aid Highway Act of 1921. The total mileage of highways doubled in the 1920s, and the administration helped establish the United States Numbered Highway System, which provided for orderly designation of highways and uniform signage on those highways.

Some have labeled Coolidge as an adherent of the laissez-faire ideology, which some critics claim led to the Great Depression. Historian Robert Sobel argues instead that Coolidge's belief in federalism guided his economic policy, writing, "as Governor of Massachusetts, Coolidge supported wages and hours legislation, opposed child labor, imposed economic controls during World War I, favored safety measures in factories, and even worker representation on corporate boards...such matters were considered the responsibilities of state and local governments." Historian David Greenberg argues that Coolidge's economic policies, designed primarily to bolster American industry, are best described as Hamiltonian rather than laissez-faire.

=== Taxation and government spending ===
Coolidge took office in the aftermath of World War I, during which the United States had raised taxes to unprecedented rates. Coolidge's taxation policy was largely set by Treasury Secretary Mellon, who held that "scientific taxation"—lower taxes—would actually increase rather than decrease government receipts. The Revenue Act of 1921, which had been proposed by Mellon, had reduced the top marginal tax rate from 71 percent to 58 percent, and Mellon sought to further reduce rates and abolish other taxes during Coolidge's presidency.

Coolidge spent early 1924 opposing the World War Adjusted Compensation Act or "Bonus Bill," which he believed would be a fiscally irresponsible expenditure. With a budget surplus, many legislators wanted to reward the veterans of World War I with extra compensation, arguing that the soldiers had been paid poorly during the war. Coolidge and Mellon preferred to use the budget surplus to cut taxes, and they did not believe that the country could pass the Bonus Bill, cut taxes, and maintain a balanced budget. However, the Bonus Bill gained wide support and was endorsed by several prominent Republicans, including Henry Cabot Lodge and Charles Curtis. Congress overrode Coolidge's veto of the Bonus Bill, handing the president a defeat in his first major legislative battle.

With his legislative priorities in jeopardy following the debate over the Bonus Bill, Coolidge backed off on his goal of lowering the top tax rate down to 25 percent. After much legislative haggling, Congress passed the Revenue Act of 1924, which reduced income tax rates and eliminated all income taxation for some two million people. The act reduced the top marginal tax rate from 58 percent to 46 percent, but increased the estate tax and bolstered it with a new gift tax. After his re-election in 1924, Coolidge sought further tax reductions, and Congress cut taxes with the Revenue Acts of 1926 and 1928. Congress abolished the gift tax in 1926, but Mellon was unable to win repeal of the estate tax, which had been established by the Revenue Act of 1916. In addition to cutting top rates, the tax acts also increased the amount of income exempt from taxation, and by 1928 only 2 percent of taxpayers paid any federal income tax. By 1930, one-third of federal revenue came from income taxes, one-third from corporate taxes, and most of the remaining third came from the tariff and excise taxes on tobacco.

Coolidge inherited a budget surplus of $700 million, but also a federal debt of $22.3 billion, with most of that debt having been accumulated in World War I. Federal spending remained flat during Coolidge's administration, contributing to the retirement of about one-fourth of the federal debt. Coolidge would be the last president to significantly reduce the total amount of federal debt until Bill Clinton's tenure in the 1990s, although intervening presidents would preside over a reduction of debt in proportion to the country's gross domestic product.

=== Immigration ===
A strong nativist movement had arisen in the years prior to Coolidge's presidency, with hostility focused on immigrants from Eastern Europe, Southeastern Europe, and East Asia. In 1920, arguably the Republican party's most prominent and respected member after Theodore Roosevelt, Henry Cabot Lodge penned "Immigration-A Review", a strong rebuke to liberal immigration policy, Lodge linked to literacy rates, and country of origin to back the nativist movement after the war. Referencing the Chinese Exclusion Act, Lodge argued that the same model needs to be applied to all "asiatic labor". A constituent writing to Senator William Borah reflected the opinion of many who favored immigration restriction, stating "immigration should be completely stopped for at least one generation until we can assimilate and Americanize the millions who are in our midst." Prior to Coolidge's presidency, Congress had passed the Immigration Act of 1917, which imposed a literacy test on immigrants, and the Emergency Quota Act of 1921, which put a temporary cap on the number of immigrants accepted into the country. In the years after the passage of the Emergency Quota Act, members of Congress debated the substance of a permanent immigration bill. Most leaders of both parties favored a permanent bill that would greatly restrict immigration, with the major exception being Al Smith and other urban Democrats. Business leaders had previously favored unlimited immigration to the United States, but mechanization, the entrance of women into the labor force, and the migration of Southern blacks into the North had all contributed to reduced demand for foreign-born labor.

Coolidge endorsed an extension of the cap on immigration in his 1923 State of the Union, but his administration was less supportive of the continuation of the National Origins Formula, which effectively restricted immigration from countries outside of Northwestern Europe. Secretary of State Hughes strongly opposed the quotas, particularly the total ban on Japanese immigration, which violated the Gentlemen's Agreement of 1907 with Japan. Despite his own reservations, Coolidge chose to sign the restrictive Immigration Act of 1924. The Emergency Quota Act had limited annual immigration from any given country to 3% of the immigrant population from that country living in the United States in 1920; the Immigration Act of 1924 changed this to 2% of the immigrant population from a given country living in the United States in 1890. As the Immigration Act of 1924 remained in force until the passage of the Immigration and Nationality Act of 1965, it greatly affected the demographics of immigration for several decades.

=== Opposition to farm subsidies ===
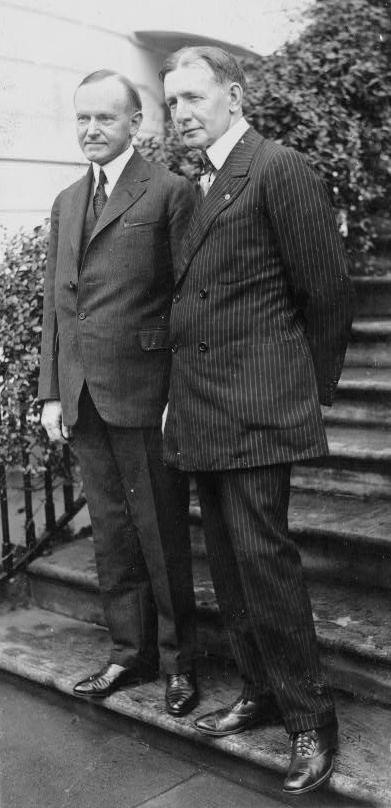
Coolidge with his vice president, Charles G. Dawes

Perhaps the most contentious issue of Coolidge's presidency was relief for farmers, whose incomes had collapsed after World War I. Many farmers were unable to sell their crops, in a phenomenon known as overproduction. Contributing factors to agricultural overproduction included increasing competition on world markets and the introduction of tractors, which increased the productivity of individual farmers and opened up farmland that had previously been devoted to growing crops used to feed farm animals. Overproduction led to an ongoing farm crisis that proved devastating to many rural areas. The farm crisis was a major political issue throughout the 1920s as farmers remained a powerful voting bloc despite the rising tide of urbanization.

Secretary of Agriculture Henry Cantwell Wallace floated the possibility of restricting the number of acres that each farmer would be allowed to farm, but the unpopularity of this proposal among farmers made it politically infeasible. After the 1924 elections, the Coolidge administration introduced an agricultural plan that emphasized agricultural cooperatives to help control prices, but it found little favor among farmers. The farm bloc instead coalesced behind the ideas of George Peek, whose proposals to raise farm prices inspired the McNary–Haugen Farm Relief Bill. McNary–Haugen proposed the establishment of a federal farm board that would purchase surplus production in high-yield years and hold it for later sale or sell it abroad. The government would lose money in selling the crops abroad, but would recoup some of that loss through fees on farmers who benefited from the program. Proponents of the bill argued that the program was little different from protective tariffs, which they argued were used to disproportionately benefit industrial concerns. Coolidge opposed McNary-Haugen, declaring that agriculture must stand "on an independent business basis," and said that "government control cannot be divorced from political control." The first and second incarnations of the McNary-Haugen bill were defeated in 1924 and 1925, but the bill remained popular as the farm crisis continued.

A decline in cotton prices in 1925 raised the possibility that Southern congressmen would join with Western congressmen in supporting a major agricultural bill. Seeking to prevent the creation of a major new government program, Coolidge sought to peel away potential supporters of McNary-Haugen and mobilized businessmen and other groups in opposition to the bill. He supported the Curtis-Crisp Act, which would have created a federal board to lend money to farm co-operatives in times of surplus, but the bill floundered in Congress. In February 1927, Congress took up the McNary-Haugen bill again, this time narrowly passing it, and Coolidge vetoed it. In his veto message, Coolidge expressed the belief that the bill would do nothing to help farmers, benefiting only exporters and expanding the federal bureaucracy. Congress did not override the veto, but it passed the bill again in May 1928 by an increased majority; again, Coolidge vetoed it. "Farmers never have made much money," said Coolidge, adding, "I do not believe we can do much about it." Secretary Jardine developed his own plan to address the farm crisis that established a Federal Farm Board, and his plan eventually would form the basis of the Agricultural Marketing Act of 1929, which was passed months after Coolidge left office.

=== Great Mississippi Flood ===
Coolidge has often been criticized for his actions during the Great Mississippi Flood of 1927, the worst natural disaster to hit the Gulf Coast until Hurricane Katrina in 2005. He initially declined the request of six governors to provide federal assistance and visit the site of the flooding. Although he did eventually name Secretary Hoover to a head a federal commission in charge of flood relief, scholars argue that Coolidge overall showed a lack of interest in federal flood control. Coolidge did not believe that personally visiting the region after the floods would accomplish anything, and that it would be seen as mere political grandstanding. He also did not want to incur the federal spending that flood control would require; he believed property owners should bear much of the cost. Congress, meanwhile, favored a bill that would place the federal government completely in charge of flood mitigation. When Congress passed a compromise measure in 1928, Coolidge declined to take credit for it and signed the Flood Control Act of 1928 in private on May 15.

=== Labor ===
Union membership declined during the 1920s, partly because of consistently rising wages and the declining length of the average work week. Compared to previous years, Coolidge's tenure saw relatively few strikes, and the only major labor disturbance Coolidge faced was the 1923 anthracite coal strike. Coolidge generally avoided labor issues, leaving the administration's response to unrest in the mines to Hoover. Hoover produced the Jacksonville agreement, a voluntary compact between miners and mining companies, but the agreement had little effect. During the 1920s, the conservative Taft Court issued several holdings that damaged labor unions and allowed federal courts to use injunctions to end strikes. The Supreme Court was also hostile to federal regulations designed to ensure minimal working conditions, and it declared minimum wage laws unconstitutional in the 1923 case of Adkins v. Children's Hospital.

In June 1924, after the Supreme Court twice struck down federal laws regulating and taxing goods produced by employees under the ages of 14 and 16, Congress approved an amendment to the United States Constitution that would specifically authorize Congress to regulate "labor of persons under eighteen years of age". Coolidge expressed support for the amendment in his first State of the Union. The amendment, commonly known as the Child Labor Amendment, was never ratified by the requisite number of states, and, as there was no time limit set for its ratification, is still pending before the states. However, the Supreme Court made the Child Labor Amendment a moot issue with its ruling in the 1941 case of United States v. Darby Lumber Co..

=== Other issues ===
==== Cultural ====
Calvin Coolidge and Charles Lindbergh (1928)

Coolidge was president during a time of great cultural and social change. New and exciting technologies connected people and transportation made the entire nation a cohesive and connected land. Historian Frederick Lewis Allen described the 20s as a dramatic "revolution in manners and morals", driven by new commodities like jazz, flappers, radio, and automobiles. During Coolidge's term the Sesquicentennial of the nation was celebrated. Additionally, the event popularized in aviation history of Lindburgh's flight on the Spirit of St. Louis was celebrated and resulted in a new sense of patriotism during this time of relative prosperity and peace.

==== Prohibition ====
The Eighteenth Amendment, ratified in 1920, had effectively established the prohibition of alcoholic beverages in the United States, and the Volstead Act had established penalties for violating the amendment. Coolidge personally opposed Prohibition, but sought to enforce federal law and refrained from serving liquor in the White House. Though Congress had established the Bureau of Prohibition to enforce the Volstead Act, federal enforcement of Prohibition was lax. As most states left enforcement of Prohibition to the federal government, the illegal production of alcoholic beverages flourished. Leaders of organized crime like Arnold Rothstein and Al Capone arranged for the importation of alcohol from Canada and other locations, and the profitability of bootlegging contributed to the rising influence of organized crime. Nonetheless, alcohol consumption fell dramatically during the 1920s, in part due to the high price of alcoholic drinks.

==== Civil rights ====
The ratification of the 19th amendment in August 1920 gave women the right to vote in every state in time for the 1920 elections. Politicians responded to the greatly enlarged electorate by emphasizing issues of special interest to women, especially prohibition, child health, public schools, and world peace. Women did respond to these issues, but in terms of general voting they had the same outlook and the same voting behavior as men. Thus by 1928, they realized that special appeals had little effect and there was less special attention.

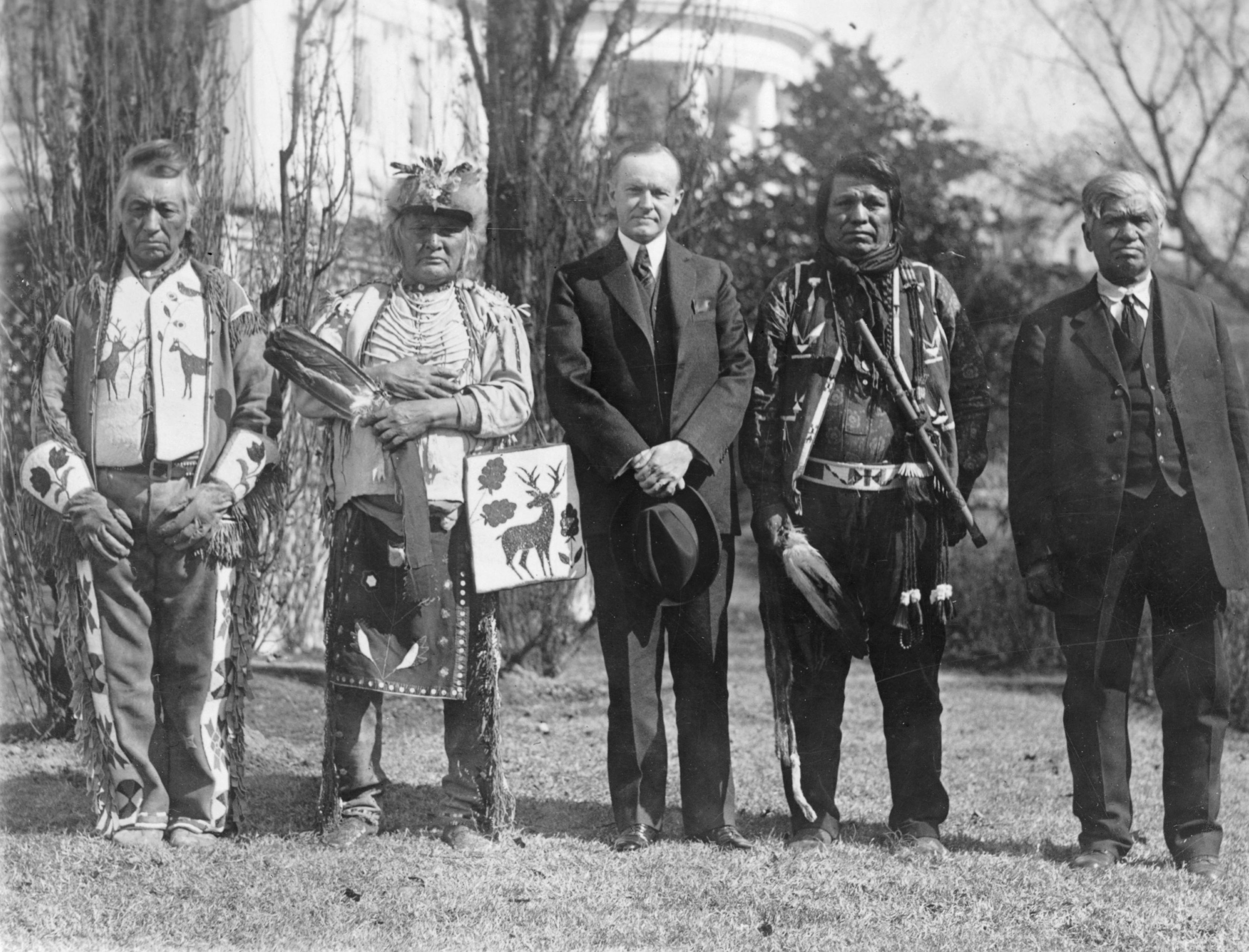
Osage men with Coolidge after he signed the bill granting Native Americans on reservations full citizenship

Coolidge spoke in favor of the civil rights of African Americans, saying in his first State of the Union address that their rights were "just as sacred as those of any other citizen" under the U.S. Constitution and that it was a "public and a private duty to protect those rights." He disliked the Ku Klux Klan and no known Klan members were appointed to office during his administration; indeed, the Klan lost most of its influence during his term. When he first took office, Coolidge called for laws to prohibit lynching, saying in his 1923 State of the Union address that it was a "hideous crime" of which African Americans were "by no means the sole sufferers" but made up the "majority of the victims." However, congressional attempts to pass anti-lynching legislation were blocked by Southern Democrats. Coolidge ultimately abandoned his attempts to pass anti-lynching legislation because he feared this was distract from passing tax cuts. In addition, Coolidge refused to denounce the Klan in the 1924 presidential election even though his segregationist Democratic opponent John W. Davis denounced the KKK and called for Coolidge to join him in denouncing the organization. Some of Coolidge's supporters have claimed that Coolidge did not denounce the KKK because he was grieving the death of his son at the time. Coolidge did not emphasize the appointment of African-Americans to federal positions, and he did not appoint any prominent blacks during his tenure as president. Coolidge would end up losing most of the Indiana black vote in 1924 because the Indiana Republican Party was taken over by the Klan and KKK member Edward Jackson was the Republican nominee for governor. However, Coolidge maintained most of the black vote outside of Indiana; despite the lack of real action by Coolidge and other Republicans on civil rights by the 1920s, most black voters still believed that the Republican Party was the lesser of evils compared to the Democrats. Women suffrage had little effect in the South, where very few black women were allowed to vote.

On June 2, 1924, partially in recognition of the thousands of natives who joined the military during World War I, Coolidge signed the Indian Citizenship Act, which granted U.S. citizenship to all Native Americans, while permitting them to retain tribal land and cultural rights. By that time, two-thirds of Native Americans were already citizens, having gained citizenship through marriage, military service, or the land allotments that had earlier taken place. The act was unclear on whether the federal government or the tribal leaders retained tribal sovereignty. Coolidge also appointed the Committee of One Hundred, a reform panel to examine federal institutions and programs dealing with Indian nations. This committee recommended that the government conduct an in-depth investigation into reservation life, resulting in the Meriam Report of 1928.

== Foreign affairs ==
=== League of Nations and World Court ===
Although not an isolationist, Coolidge was reluctant to enter into foreign alliances. He considered the 1920 Republican victory as a rejection of the Wilsonian position that the United States should join the League of Nations. While not completely opposed to the idea, Coolidge believed the League, as then constituted, did not serve American interests, and he did not advocate membership. He spoke in favor of the United States joining the Permanent Court of International Justice (World Court), provided that the nation would not be bound by advisory decisions. In 1926, the Senate eventually approved joining the Court (with reservations). The League of Nations accepted the reservations, but it suggested some modifications of its own. The Senate failed to act on the modifications, and the United States never joined the World Court.

=== Reparations and war debts ===
In the aftermath of World War I, several European nations struggled with debt, much of which was owed to the United States. These European nations were in turn owed an enormous sum from Germany in the form of World War I reparations, and the German economy buckled under the weight of these reparations. Coolidge rejected calls to forgive Europe's debt or lower tariffs on European goods, but the Occupation of the Ruhr in 1923 stirred him to action. On Secretary of State Hughes's initiative, Coolidge appointed Charles Dawes to lead an international commission to reach an agreement on Germany's reparations. The resulting Dawes Plan provided for restructuring of the German debt, and the United States loaned money to Germany to help it repay its debt to other countries. The Dawes Plan led to a boom in the German economy, as well as a sentiment of international cooperation.

Building on the success of the Dawes Plan, U.S. ambassador Alanson B. Houghton helped organize the Locarno Conference in October 1925. The conference was designed to ease tensions between Germany and France, the latter of which feared a German rearmament. In the Locarno Treaties, France, Belgium, and Germany each agreed to respect the borders established by the Treaty of Versailles and pledged not to attack each other. Germany also agreed to arbitrate its eastern boundaries with the states created in the Treaty of Versailles.

=== Disarmament and renunciation of war ===
Coolidge's primary foreign policy initiative was the Kellogg–Briand Pact of 1928, named for Secretary of State Kellogg and French foreign minister Aristide Briand. Nearly all major countries signed it. The treaty, ratified in 1929, committed signatories to "renounce war, as an instrument of national policy in their relations with one another." The treaty did not achieve the immediate ending of wars—but it did provide the founding principle for international law after World War II. Coolidge's policy of international disarmament allowed the administration to decrease military spending, a part of Coolidge's broader policy of decreasing government spending. Coolidge also favored an extension of the Washington Naval Treaty to cover cruisers, but the U.S., Britain, and Japan were unable to come to an agreement at the Geneva Naval Conference.

Coolidge was impressed with the success of the Washington Naval Conference of 1921–22, and called a second international conference in 1927 to deal with related naval issues, especially putting limits on the number of warships under 10,000 tons. The Geneva Naval Conference failed because France refused to participate, and also because most of the delegates were admirals who did not want to limit their fleets.

=== Latin America ===
After the Mexican Revolution, the U.S. had refused to recognize the government of Álvaro Obregón, one of the revolution's leaders. Secretary of State Hughes had worked with Mexico to normalize relations during the Harding administration, and President Coolidge recognized the Mexican government in 1923. To help Obregón defeat a rebellion, Coolidge also lifted an embargo on Mexico and encouraged U.S. banks to loan money to the Mexican government. In 1924, Plutarco Elías Calles took office as President of Mexico, and Calles sought to limit American property claims and take control of the holdings of the Catholic Church. However, Ambassador Dwight Morrow convinced Calles to allow Americans to retain their rights to property purchased before 1917, and Mexico and the United States enjoyed good relations for the remainder of Coolidge's presidency. With the aid of a Catholic priest from the U.S., Morrow also helped bring an end to the Cristero War, a Catholic revolt against Calles's government.

The United States' occupation of Nicaragua and Haiti continued under Coolidge's administration, though Coolidge withdrew American troops from the Dominican Republic in 1924. The U.S. established a domestic constabulary in the Dominican Republic to promote internal order without the need for U.S. intervention, but the constabulary's leader, Rafael Trujillo, eventually seized power. Coolidge led the U.S. delegation to the Sixth International Conference of American States, January 15–17, 1928, in Havana, Cuba. This was the only international trip Coolidge made during his presidency. There, he extended an olive branch to Latin American leaders embittered over America's interventionist policies in Central America and the Caribbean. For 88 years he was the only sitting president to have visited Cuba, until Barack Obama did so in 2016.

Under the leadership of economist Edwin W. Kemmerer, the U.S. extended its influence in Latin America through financial advisers. With the support of the State Department, Kemmerer negotiated agreements with Colombia, Chile, and other countries in which the countries received loans and agreed to follow the advice of U.S. financial advisers. These "Kemmerized" countries received substantial investments and became increasingly dependent on trade with the United States. While the countries enjoyed good economic conditions in the 1920s, many would struggle in the 1930s.

=== East Asia ===
Relations with Japan had warmed with the signing of the Washington Naval Treaty and were further bolstered by U.S. aid in the aftermath of the 1923 Great Kantō earthquake, which killed as many as 200,000 Japanese and left another 2 million homeless. However, relations soured with the passage of the Immigration Act of 1924, which banned immigration from Japan to the United States. U.S. officials encouraged Japan to protest the ban while the legislation was drafted, but Japanese threats backfired as supporters of the legislation used the threats to galvanize opposition to Japanese immigration. The immigration legislation sparked a major backlash in Japan, strengthening the position of those in Japan who favored expansionism over cooperation with Western powers.

The Coolidge administration at first avoided engagement with the Republic of China, which was led by Sun Yat-sen and his successor, Chiang Kai-shek. The administration protested the Northern Expedition when it resulted in attacks on foreigners, and refused to consider renegotiating treaties reached with China when it had been under the rule of the Qing dynasty. In 1927, Chiang purged his government of communists and began to seek U.S. support. Seeking closer relations with China, Secretary of State Kellogg agreed to grant tariff autonomy, meaning that China would have the right to set import duties on American goods.

== Elections during the Coolidge presidency ==
=== Election of 1924 ===
1924 electoral college results

The nation initially did not know what to make of Coolidge, who had maintained a low profile in the Harding administration; many even expected him to be replaced on the ballot in the 1924 presidential election. The 1923 United Mine Workers coal strike presented an immediate challenge to Coolidge, who avoided becoming closely involved in the strike. Pennsylvania Governor Gifford Pinchot, a progressive Republican and potential rival for the 1924 presidential nomination, quickly settled the strike with little input from the federal government. Pinchot's settlement of the strike backfired, as he took the blame for rising coal prices, and Coolidge quickly consolidated his power among Republican elites. Potential opponents like Governor Frank Lowden of Illinois and General Leonard Wood failed to generate support for a challenge to Coolidge, while automobile magnate Henry Ford endorsed Coolidge for president in December 1923.

The Republican Convention was held on June 10–12, 1924, in Cleveland, Ohio; Coolidge was nominated on the first ballot. Coolidge's nomination made him the second unelected president to win his party's nomination for another term, after Theodore Roosevelt. Prior to the convention, Coolidge courted progressive Senator William Borah to join the ticket, but Borah refused to relinquish his Senate seat. Republicans then nominated Lowden for vice president on the second ballot, but he also declined. Finally diplomat and banker Charles G. Dawes was nominated on the third ballot.

The Democrats held their convention the next month in New York City. Wilson's Treasury Secretary William Gibbs McAdoo had been regarded by many as the front-runner, but his candidacy was damaged by his connection to the Teapot Dome Scandal. Nonetheless, he entered the convention as one of the two strongest candidates, alongside Governor Al Smith of New York. Smith and McAdoo epitomized the divide in the Democratic Party; Smith drew support from Northeastern cities, with their large ethnic populations of Catholics and Jews. McAdoo's base was in the Protestant strongholds of the rural South and West. The convention deadlocked over the presidential nominee, and after 103 ballots, the delegates finally agreed on a little-known compromise candidate, John W. Davis, who picked the brother of William Jennings Bryan. The Democrats' hopes were buoyed when Robert LaFollette, a Republican senator from Wisconsin, split from the GOP to form a new Progressive Party. La Follette's Progressives were hostile to the conservatism of both major party candidates, and energized by the ongoing farm crisis. They hoped to throw the election to the House by denying the Republican ticket an electoral vote majority, and some Progressives hoped to permanently disrupt the two-party system. On the other hand, many believed that the split in the Republican party, like the one in 1912, would allow a Democrat to win the presidency.

After the conventions and the death of his younger son Calvin, Coolidge became withdrawn; he later said that "when he [the son] died, the power and glory of the Presidency went with him." It was the most subdued Republican campaign in memory, partly because of Coolidge's grief, but also because of his naturally non-confrontational style. Coolidge relied on advertising executive Bruce Barton to lead his messaging campaign, and Barton's ads depicted Coolidge as a symbol of solidity in an era of speculation. Although the Republicans had been tarred by several scandals, by 1924 several Democrats had also been implicated and the partisan responsibility of the issue had been muddled. Coolidge and Dawes won every state outside the South except Wisconsin, La Follette's home state. Coolidge won 54 percent of the popular vote, while Davis took just 28.8 percent and La Follette won 16.6 percent, one of the strongest third-party presidential showings in U.S. history. In the concurrent congressional elections, Republicans increased their majorities in the House and Senate.

=== Election of 1928 and transition ===
Republican Herbert Hoover defeated Democrat Al Smith in the 1928 election.

After the 1924 election, many pundits assumed that Coolidge would seek another term in 1928, but Coolidge had other plans. While on vacation in mid-1927, Coolidge issued a terse statement, "I do not choose to run", for a second full term as president. In his memoirs, Coolidge explained his decision not to run: "The Presidential office takes a heavy toll of those who occupy it and those who are dear to them. While we should not refuse to spend and be spent in the service of our country, it is hazardous to attempt what we feel is beyond our strength to accomplish." With Coolidge's pending retirement, speculation on the 1928 Republican presidential nominee focused on Senator Charles Curtis, Senator William Borah, former Governor Frank Lowden, Vice President Dawes, former Secretary of State Hughes, and, especially, Secretary of Commerce Herbert Hoover.

Coolidge was reluctant to endorse Hoover as his successor; on one occasion he remarked that "for six years that man has given me unsolicited advice—all of it bad." Hoover also faced opposition from Mellon and other conservatives due to Hoover's progressive stance on some issues. Nonetheless, Hoover's standing at the head of the party was solidified by his handling of the Great Mississippi Flood, and he faced little opposition at the 1928 Republican National Convention. Accepting the presidential nomination, Hoover stated, "we in America today are nearer to the final triumph over poverty than ever before in the history of any land...given the chance to go forward with the policies of the last eight years, we shall soon with the help of God be in sight of the day when poverty will be banished from this nation."

Having been badly defeated in the last two presidential elections, and still facing bitter divisions between the Southern and Northeastern wings of the party, few Democrats believed their party would win the 1928 presidential election. By the time of the 1928 Democratic National Convention, Al Smith had emerged as the prohibitive favorite for the presidential nomination. Like Hoover, Smith was nominated on the first ballot of his party's national convention. Smith's policies differed little from those of Hoover, and the 1928 presidential campaign instead centered on Smith's character, affiliation with the Catholic Church, and opposition to Prohibition. Hoover won a landslide victory, even taking Smith's home state of New York and several states in the Solid South.

== Historical reputation ==
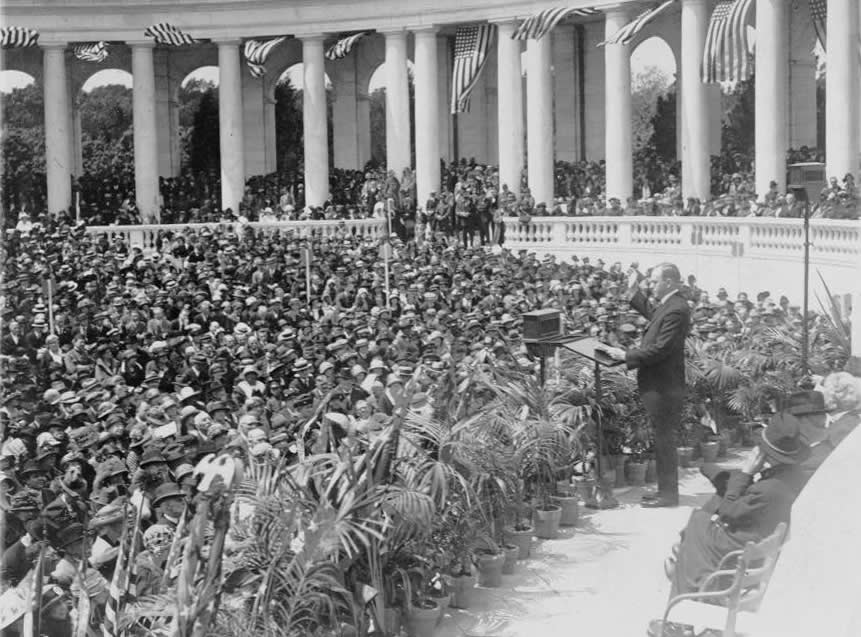
Coolidge speaking at the Memorial Ampitheater

Calvin Coolidge (1924)

In 2012 Robert W. Merry described Coolidge as underrated stating:

“if you look at it from the standpoint of the voters, presided over marvelously good times, though people forget or else don't quite know that economic growth was slowing significantly in the last two years of his administration. Nevertheless he was presiding over a period of very solid boom times economically, nothing was happening in the world, there were no major scandals, he didn't get us into any intractable wars, so there was no reason for the American people to feel ill about Silent Cal. And, in my view, there's no reason for historians to dismiss him quite so much. I think they dismiss him because he was not in favor of activist government, but you don't always have to be in favor of activist government in order to preside over good times.”

Jason Roberts in 2014 argues that Coolidge's legacy is still passionately debated by scholars and politicians. He writes:

An introverted man, he nonetheless was a successful politician who won all but one election....He was perceived as a conservative yet supported many progressive issues at the state and local level. He was viewed as a traditionalist yet successfully exploited the new technologies of the day such as film and radio. This enigmatic man put his stamp on the policies of the 1920s.

Coolidge was generally popular with the American people. He inspired trust, especially for his quiet devotion to duty. Claude Feuss wrote in 1940:

The qualities which Coolidge displayed as a young legislator were faithfulness to duty, reliability, discretion, tolerance, integrity, and common sense. The same qualities were his as president. Throughout his career we find in him a deep-seated regard for law, for authority, or tradition.

McCoy emphasizes Coolidge's efficiency as president:

As chief executive, Coolidge was effective because of his simple, direct, and responsible style. He normally formulated his policies only after consultation and study. Coolidge expected his subordinates to do their jobs efficiently based on those policies and it was clear that if they could not do so, he might replace them. Consequently, the president generally received faithful service from his appointees. He reinforced this by effectively using the Bureau of the Budget to control executive expenditures and programs. If Coolidge did not have a lot to administer compared with later presidents, he administered what he did have exceptionally well. Coolidge was also an excellent spokesman for his administration. He held regular press conferences—his only innovation as president—which he handled like an affable though strict schoolmaster.

Critical commentary increased with the onset of the Great Depression shortly after he left office, when opponents linked the economic troubles to Coolidge's economic policies. Coolidge's reputation in foreign policy also suffered in the 1930s as it became clear that certain policies had come undone under pressure from Germany and Japan. In the 1980s, Ronald Reagan and other conservatives looked to the Coolidge administration as a model of laissez-faire policy. Ferrell praises Coolidge for avoiding major scandals and reducing the debt, but criticizes Coolidge's inactivity in foreign policy and his failure to respond to rising stock market speculation.

Polls of historians and political scientists have generally ranked Coolidge as a below-average president. A 2018 poll of the American Political Science Association’s Presidents and Executive Politics section ranked Coolidge as the 28th best president. A 2017 C-SPAN poll of historians ranked Coolidge as the 27th best president. Greenberg writes:

Scholarly opinion looks upon the Coolidge presidency with skepticism, ranking him relatively low among American chief executives in terms of his administration's positive impact and legacy. Despite his personal integrity, he offered no sweeping vision or program of action that the presidencies of Theodore Roosevelt and Woodrow Wilson had led the public to associate with presidential greatness.

== Bibliography ==
=== Scholarly sources ===
- Adler, Selig. The Uncertain Giant, 1921–1941: American Foreign Policy Between the Wars (1965).
- Barry, John M. (1997). Rising Tide: The Great Mississippi Flood of 1927 and How It Changed America. Simon & Schuster. ISBN 978-0684840024.
- Ciment, James. Encyclopedia of the Jazz Age: From the End of World War I to the Great Crash (2015). Excerpt
- Cohen, Warren I. Empire Without Tears: America’s Foreign Relations 1921–1933. (1987)
- Deloria, Vincent (1992). American Indian Policy in the Twentieth Century. University of Oklahoma Press. ISBN 978-0806124247.
- Ellis, L. Ethan. Republican foreign policy, 1921–1933 (1968)
- Ellis, L. Ethan. Frank B. Kellogg and American Foreign Relations, 1925–1929 (1961).
- Ferrell, Robert H. (1998). The Presidency of Calvin Coolidge. University Press of Kansas. ISBN 978-0700608928.
- Freeman, Jo (2002). A Room at a Time: How Women Entered Party Politics. Rowman and Littlefield. ISBN 978-0847698059.
- Fuess, Claude M. (1940). Calvin Coolidge: The Man from Vermont. Little, Brown.
- Graff, Henry F., ed. The Presidents: A Reference History (3rd ed. 2002) online
- Greenberg, David (2006). Calvin Coolidge. The American Presidents Series. Times Books. ISBN 978-0805069570.
- Herring, George C. (2008). From Colony to Superpower; U.S. Foreign Relations Since 1776. Oxford University Press. ISBN 978-0195078220.
- Hicks, John D. Republican Ascendancy: 1921–1933 (1960) Online, scholarly survey focused on politics.
- Leuchtenburg, William. The Perils of Prosperity, 1914–32 (1958) politics, econmomics & society; Online free to borrow
- Louria, Margot. Triumph and Downfall: America’s Pursuit of Peace and Prosperity, 1921–1933 (2001)
- McCoy, Donald R. (1967). Calvin Coolidge: The Quiet President. Macmillan.
- Miller, Nathan (2003). New World Coming: The 1920s and the Making of Modern America. Scribner. ISBN 0684852950.
- Murray, Robert K. The Politics of Normalcy: Governmental Theory and Practice in the Harding-Coolidge Era (1973).
- Palmer, Niall. The 20s in America: Politics and History (Edinburgh University Press, 2006)
- Rhodes, Benjamin D. United States Foreign Policy in the Interwar Period, 1918-1941: The Golden Age of American Diplomatic and Military Complacency (Greenwood, 2001). online
- Shlaes, Amity (2013). Coolidge. New York: HarperCollins. ISBN 978-0061967559.
- Sibley, Katherine A.S., ed. A Companion to Warren G. Harding, Calvin Coolidge, and Herbert Hoover (2014); 616pp; essays by scholars stressing historiography online
- Silver, Thomas B. Coolidge and the Historians (1982) 159 pages; favors Coolidge
- Sobel, Robert (1998). Coolidge: An American Enigma. Regnery Publishing. ISBN 978-0895264107.
- White, William Allen (1938). A Puritan in Babylon: The Story of Calvin Coolidge. Macmillan.

=== Articles ===
- Bates, J. Leonard (1955). "The Teapot Dome Scandal and the Election of 1924". The American Historical Review. 60 (2): 303–322. doi:10.2307/1843188. JSTOR 1843188.
- Blair, John L. "Coolidge the Image-Maker: The President and the Press, 1923–1929." New England Quarterly (1973) #4: 499–522. Online
- Buckley, Kerry W. (December 2003). "'A President for the "Great Silent Majority': Bruce Barton's Construction of Calvin Coolidge". The New England Quarterly. 76 (4): 593–626. doi:10.2307/1559844. JSTOR 1559844.
- Clemens, Cyril, and Athern P. Daggett, "Coolidge's 'I Do Not Choose to Run': Granite or Putty?." New England Quarterly (1945) 19#2: 147–163. online
- Cornwell Jr, Elmer E. "Coolidge and presidential leadership." Public Opinion Quarterly 21.2 (1957): 265–278. Online
- Felzenberg, Alvin S. (Fall 1998). "Calvin Coolidge and Race: His Record in Dealing with the Racial Tensions of the 1920s". New England Journal of History. 55 (1): 83–96.
- Galston, Miriam (November 1995). "Activism and Restraint: The Evolution of Harlan Fiske Stone's Judicial Philosophy". 70 Tulane Law Review 137+.
- Keller, Robert R. (1982). "Supply-Side Economic Policies during the Coolidge-Mellon Era". Journal of Economic Issues. 16 (3): 773–790. doi:10.1080/00213624.1982.11504032. JSTOR 4225215.
- Leffler, Melvyn P. "American Policy Making and European Stability, 1921–1933." Pacific Historical Review 46.2 (1977): 207–228. online
- McKercher, Brian. "Reaching for the Brass Ring: The Recent Historiography of Interwar American Foreign Relations." Diplomatic History 15.4 (1991): 565–598. online
- Polsky, Andrew J.; Tkacheva, Olesya (2002). "Legacies versus Politics: Herbert Hoover, Partisan Conflict, and the Symbolic Appeal of Associationalism in the 1920s" (PDF). International Journal of Politics, Culture, and Society. 16 (2): 207–235. doi:10.1023/a:1020525029722. hdl:2027.42/43975. JSTOR 20020160. S2CID 142508983.
- Roberts, Jason. "The Biographical Legacy of Calvin Coolidge and the 1924 Presidential Election." in Sibley, ed., A Companion to Warren G. Harding, Calvin Coolidge, and Herbert Hoover (2014): 193–211.
- Rusnak, Robert J. (1983). "Andrew W. Mellon: Reluctant Kingmaker". Presidential Studies Quarterly. 13 (2): 269–278. JSTOR 27547924.
- Shideler, James H. (1950). "The La Follette Progressive Party Campaign of 1924". The Wisconsin Magazine of History. 33 (4): 444–457. JSTOR 4632172.
- Sobel, Robert. "Coolidge and American Business" (Calvin Coolidge Presidential Foundation, 1988) online
- Webster, Joel. "Coolidge against the world: Peace, prosperity, and foreign policy in the 1920s." (2017).(MA thesis, James madison U. 2017) online
- Williams, C. Fred (Spring 1996). "William M. Jardine and the Foundations for Republican Farm Policy, 1925–1929". Agricultural History. 70 (2): 216–232. JSTOR 3744534.
- Williams, William Appleman. "The Legend of Isolationism in the 1920s." Science & Society (1954): 1–20. Highly influential article from the Wisconsin school argues. US foreign policy was not isolationist, but was economically very involved with the world. Online
- Zieger, Robert H. (1965). "Pinchot and Coolidge: The Politics of the 1923 Anthracite Crisis". The Journal of American History. 52 (3): 566–581. doi:10.2307/1890848. JSTOR 1890848.

=== Primary sources ===
- Coolidge, Calvin (1919). Have Faith in Massachusetts: A Collection of Speeches and Messages (2nd ed.). Houghton Mifflin.
- Coolidge, Calvin (2004) [1926]. Foundations of the Republic: Speeches and Addresses. University Press of the Pacific. ISBN 1410215989.
- Coolidge, Calvin (1929). The Autobiography of Calvin Coolidge. Cosmopolitan Book Corp. ISBN 0944951031.
- Coolidge, Calvin (2001). Peter Hannaford (ed.). The Quotable Calvin Coolidge: Sensible Words for a New Century. Images From The Past, Incorporated. ISBN 978-1884592331.
- Coolidge, Calvin (1964). Ferrell, Robert H.; Quint, Howard H. (eds.). The Talkative President: The Off-the Record Press Conferences of Calvin Coolidge. University of Massachusetts Press. ISBN 082409705X. LCCN 78066526. Archived from the original on 2012-10-19 – via Questia.
