= Business nationalism =

Right-wing populist, isolationist and protectionist ideology held by business leaders

Business nationalism is a bloc of American ultraconservative commercial interests who advocate radical anti-communism, limited government, minimal regulatory economics, producerist narratives emphasizing economic nationalism and protectionism, laissez-faire capitalism, and isolationism that has shifted between non-interventionism and unilateralism. They are often in political conflict with corporate international interests. To build a broader base of support in the middle class and working class, business nationalists frequently employ right-wing populist and anti-elitist rhetoric.

== History ==
=== Origins and the interwar period ===
Business nationalism in the United States developed within what is now the American School of economics. During the early 20th century, American business interests were increasingly divided between multinational corporations favouring globalized international trade and investment, and domestic ones dependent on protectionism against foreign competition, becoming known as business nationalists. Their interests were particularly associated with established manufacturing, smaller and family businesses, and companies that were less internationally competitive or heavily dependent on the domestic market.

During the 1920s and early 1930s, business nationalists became an influential constituency within American economic and foreign policy, represented by organisations including the National Association of Manufacturers, local chambers of commerce, trade associations and the American Tariff League. They lobbied for higher tariffs to protect domestic manufacturing and opposed international agreements they believed would undermine domestic commercial interests. Their political influence was evident in the passage of the Fordney–McCumber Tariff and Smoot–Hawley Tariff Act, which substantially increased import duties. Business nationalists and allied Old Guard in the Republican Party also opposed American participation in the League of Nations, the reduction or cancellation of European debts from World War One, and government lending programmes to support European economic recovery.

Business nationalists included the textile manufacturing, steelmaking, the footwear industry and other labour-intensivemanufacturing sectors, as well as numerous other private companies and family businesses. They were particularly vulnerable to foreign competition and trade unions, thus tending to oppose public policies that increased labour costs or imposed additional regulatory requirements. Many also supported laissez-faire economics and resisted federal government intervention in the American economy, despite favouring protectionism against foreign competitors.

=== The New Deal and business divisions during the 1930s ===
The introduction of U.S. President Franklin D. Roosevelt’s New Deal during the 1930s increasingly divided American businesses. The administration’s regulatory economic expansion, and the like with social welfare and labour law was supported by multinational corporations that were increasingly interested in overseas investment and foreign market access. They generally favoured reducing tariffs and increasing international economic cooperation, while accepting certain domestic regulation and social programming as means of promoting economic stability and limiting industrial conflict.

Business nationalists, by contrast, often opposed the New Deal’s expansion of the federal government and strengthening of trade unions. It was especially opposed by small businesses and labour intensive manufacturing, whose profitability was more directly affected by higher wages, collective bargaining and regulatory economics. This division reinforced the political association between business nationalism and the conservative wing of the Republican Party, although nationalist business interests also maintained support among sections of the Democratic Party.

During this period, some business nationalists also drew on producerism, supposedly distinguishing between productive industrialists, manufacturers and workers from financiers and other groups portrayed as profiteering from labour. Berlet and Lyons associate this outlook with the politics of certain American industrialists, like Henry Ford, whose philosophical namesake of Fordism portrayed productive manufacturing as a basis for economic growth while condemning international finance and trade unions. In some cases, these into anti-semitic conspiracies and support for fascist movements, with certain business nationalists even financing or promoting associated organisations during the late 1930s, through this was not representative of business nationalism or protectionism as a whole.

=== The Second World War and the early Cold War ===
The Second World War strengthened strengthened multinational corporations by expanding federal government involvement in the economy, encouraging cooperation between both, and accelerating the United States’ emergence as an economic and military great power within the Western world. Following the war, American internationalists were prominent in establishing the United Nations, World Bank, International Monetary Fund, and Bretton Woods system among other international economic institutions. Business nationalists were generally remained sceptical of these developments, particularly the threat international economic cooperation threatened their interests or supported the recovery of foreign industrial competitors.

Before American entry into the Second World War, many business nationalists supported isolationism and anti-interventionism, particularly opposition to American involvement in European theatre. Business nations executives, including Robert E. Wood of Sears, Roebuck, and Co. participated in the America First Committee. However, their opposition to intervening in the European theatre did not necessarily mean opposing American expansionism. Some business nationalists favoured commercial and strategic expansion in Latin America and Asia, particularly where it provided market and raw material access.

During the early Cold War, business nationalism was increasingly associated with radical anti-communism. Following the end of the Chinese Civil War in 1949, business nationalists and their political allies advocated rollback of communism internationally rather than containment. They generally favoured a unilateral rather than internationalist foreign policy as favoured by much of the political establishment at the time, including its reliance on multilateralism, foreign aid and collective security. Domestically, their anti-communism was directed against the New Deal, trade unions, and federal government institutions they associated with collectivism and communist subversion.

Business nationalists were especially influential in the Republican Party’s Old Guard and Democratic Party's Southern Democrats. During this period, they maintained important relations with the National Association of Manufacturers and the United States Chamber of Commerce. Their influence was also reflected in support for restrictive labour legislation, including the Taft–Hartley Act, which imposed significant restrictions on trade unions.

Nevertheless, business nationalists did not succeed in dismantling the New Deal in its entirety, and their political disagreements with their opponents didn't prevent cooperation on certain issues. Both factions supported aspects of American anti-communist foreign policy, although they differed over approach institutions, and priorities abroad, with business nationalists remaining influential but comparatively less dominant in the post-war business establishment.

=== The 1960s and 1970s ===
During the 1960s and 1970s, changing international competition, industrial production and commercial investment gradually changed the business nationalist bloc. The expansion of internationally competitive American corporations, alongside the growing economic influence of Japan and West Germany, encouraged many businesses to reconsider previous dependence on domestic protection. Some traditionally protectionist-reliant industries began expanding abroad, developing international supply chains and pursuing export markets. As a result, parts of the American business establishment previously supportive of economic nationalism became increasingly regionally integrated or globalized.

The collapse of the Bretton Woods system and liberalisation of international financial markets intensified disagreements between business interests. Internationally competitive corporations and financial institutions increasingly favoured the removal of capital controls and expansion of overseas investment. Businesses more dependent on domestic production and employment, particularly those facing increasingly competitive foreign imports, continued to advocate protectionism. These divisions contributed to continued business-nationalist opposition to free trade, even as their counterparts become more globalized.

At the same time, business nationalists increasingly realigned within the broader American conservative movement. Although traditional business nationalists continued to oppose aspects of free trade, multinational corporations, financial institutions and domestic manufacturing coalesced as a coalition around policies pursuing reduced corporate taxes, deregulation, restrictions on trade unions and increased defense expenditure. Consequently, this coalition during the 1970s and 1980s was not exclusively business nationalist, but included competing globalized, regionalist and protectionist interests.

=== The 1980s ===
During the 1980s, business nationalism continued to influence American trade policy, particularly industries threatened by foreign imports. However, the development of regional production networks complicated the previous distinction between nationalist and globalized business interests. American automotive and electronics industries increasingly relocated parts of production to countries with lower-wage, particularly Mexico, while seeking preferential treatment for North American producers against extra-continental competition, thus supporting certain regional trade agreements while continuing to favour protections from otherwise foreign competitors. This represented a transition towards regionalism, with businesses preserving preferential economic advantages within North America rather than relying exclusively on protectionism.

=== The 1990s ===
During the 1990s, business nationalism experienced renewed political visibility through opposition to international trade agreements, economic globalization and multinational corporate influence. The proposed North American Free Trade Agreement (NAFTA), the General Agreement on Tariffs and Trade (GATT), the establishment of the World Trade Organization and proposals for further international investment agreements became important subjects of political opposition.

Patrick Buchanan's 1992 presidential campaign was a prominent attempt to revive business nationalism. Buchanan criticized United States president George H. W. Bush's internationalist foreign policy, opposed NAFTA and portrayed multinational corporations, foreign competitors and international organizations as threats to American economic independence. His rhetoric drew upon on previous business nationalist opposition to international finance and globalization, while appealing to voters concerned about foreign competition, deindustrialization, and respective unemployment.

Buchanan was supported from protectionist business interests, including the anti-free-trade United States Business and Industry Council and textile magnate Roger Milliken. Nevertheless, his campaign was substantially opposed by the broader business community because many American corporations, including those long associated with conservatism, had by this time developed significant interests in globalized trade and investment.

Business nationalist opposition also influenced the United States Congress's discussion over trade policy. Although United States president Bill Clinton's administration secured approval for both NAFTA and the GATT, a coalition of business nationalists and labour-oriented liberals helped defeat the attempt at renewing of presidential authority to fast-track trade negotiations in 1997.

By this time, business nationalism persisted but increasingly fragmented within American conservatism. Its traditional constituency of domestic protectionist business interests diminished as they industries became globally or regionally integrated. Nevertheless, business nationalist opposition to free trade, influence of multinational corporations and international economic institutions continued to influence conservative political movements, especially left-wing populists and anti-globalists.

=== Resurgence during the Trump presidency ===
Donald Trump's 2016 presidential campaign revived business nationalism in American conservatism, with protectionism and anti-immigration being signature themes of his campaign, and subsequent presidency.

== Views ==
=== Protectionism ===
Business nationalists generally supported import tariffs, restrictions and other trade measures to preserve domestic producer's market share from foreign competitors and maintain their profitability in markets where they may otherwise struggle to compete. In the United States, business nationalists and their political allies especially supported higher tariffs during the interwar period and successfully lobbied for both the Fordney–McCumber Tariff and Smoot–Hawley Tariff Act. They also opposed some international agreements they believed undermined domestic commercial interests, including American participation in the League of Nations and proposals to reduce or cancel the war debts owed by European countries to the United States because of the World War I.

Their espousal of protectionism did not necessarily entail opposition to all international trade, but a preference for agreements preserving advantages for domestic production while allowing the federal government to restrict imports where such industries were vulnerable. Business nationalists sometimes supported selective trade agreements, preferential treatment for domestic firms and exemptions from the provisions of broader free trade agreements.

=== Anti-globalism ===
Business nationalists also opposed international economic agreements they thought weakened trade, investment and economic policy, viewing multinational corporations and international organizations as undermining sovereignty by offshoring production and investing overseas, increasing foreign market influence in the United States, limiting federal, state, and local governments’ ability to protect local industry. Business nationalists consequently favour greater federal control over trade, balance of payments, and increased capital controls, rather than expansion of free trade and globalization.

=== Limited government ===
Despite their support for market intervention to protect domestic industry, business nationalists often opposed extensive regulatory economics, favouring comparatively limited government in economic policy, particularly where regulation, labour law or welfare are thought to increase operating expenses or restrict business administration. During the New Deal, this frequently included opposition to strengthening the above laws and collective bargaining, being particularly concerned increased labour costs and regulatory economics could reduce business competition and profitability.

They didn't consistently oppose market intervention however, instead supporting such when it served domestic commercial or strategic interests, particularly through tariffs, import restrictions, subsidies and defense expenditure. Sometimes, business nationalists also supported military expansion when it was commercially advantageous or protected access to strategically important markets and raw materials.

=== Isolationism and economic nationalism ===
Business nationalists in the United States have also been historically associated with scepticism towards multilateralism, treaties, and aid that might benefit overseas competitors. During the 1930s and early 1940s, many business nationalists opposed American involvement in the European Theatre of the World War II and supported non-interventionism, including the America First Committee. However, this did not necessarily represent a general opposition to military expansion or interventionism, instead favouring unilateral expansionism in Latin America and Asia, particularly in advancing commercial or strategic interests. Some also supported military intervention and the acquisition of overseas resources while opposing international commitments that they considered disadvantageous to American businesses.

During the Cold War, parts of the business nationalist bloc increasingly supported a rollback rather than containment, with the politically aligned Old Guard wanting to defeat what they ultimately feared could be world communism. They tended to favour a unilateral defense policy and relatively inexpensive power projection, such as airpower and nuclear weapons, over extensive overseas aid and large overseas land warfare commitments. Domestically, they sought to weaken organised labour and dismantle parts of the New Deal they associated with collectivism and communist influence.

=== Right-wing populism ===
Business nationalism sometimes overlapped with right-wing populism, particularly in their espousal of anti-elitism and opposition to multinational corporations and international financial institutions associated with economic globalization, drawing on producerism, which contrasts allegedly productive members of society with groups portrayed as unfairly benefiting from the former. Historically, some right-wing movements used this view to condemn financiers and international banking interests while presenting domestic business owners and other producers as defending economic sovereignty. Such rhetoric developed into conspiracies to explain economic and political change, including the International Jewish conspiracy and other alleged elites in finance. Some business nationalists supported or financed fascist political activity in the 1930s; however, not all business nationalists shared these views or belonged to the same political movements.

Around 2000, business nationalists opposed multinational corporations on the grounds they undermined American sovereignty, thus opposing immigration, favouring trade restrictions and capital controls. Business nationalists would also enlist grassroots support from right-wing populist particularly opposed to globalization and internationalism.

=== Differing interests ===
Business nationalists were not a completely unified political or economic movement, with its supporters including various industries with different management, regional interests and foreign policy priorities. Some favoured protectionism to primarily preserve domestic market share, while others have supported more expansive foreign policies if they could benefit fro, overseas trade, investment or access to raw materials. Business nationalists at times also cooperated with liberal internationalists on particular issues, despite disagreeing over trade policy and international economic institutions.

== Notable people ==
=== Activists ===
- Henry Salvatori – Geophysicist, businessman, philanthropist, and political activist
- Gerald L.K. Smith – Leader of the Christian Nationalist Crusade (1947-1976), national organizer of the Share our Wealth Society (1934-1935)

=== Businessmen ===
- Hugh Roy Cullen – Texan industrialist and philanthropist
- Horace Elgin Dodge – Vice President and Chief Engineer of the Dodge Brothers Company (1900-1920)
- John Francis Dodge – President and CEO of the Dodge Brothers Company (1900-1920)
- Henry Ford – President of the Ford Motor Company (1906-1919, 1943-1945)
- Lammot du Pont – Chairman and President of E.I. du Pont de Nemours Co. (1926-1940)
- Jay Catherwood Hormel – Chairman of Hormel Foods (1929-1954)
- H.L. Hunt – Owner of Hunt Oil (1934-1974)
- Clint Murchinson Sr. – Owner of Southern Union Company (1929-1969)
- J. Howard Pew – President of Sun Oil Company (1912-1947)
- Ross Perot – Chairman of Perot Systems (1988-2000), CEO of Electronic Data Systems (1962-1985)
- William H. Regnery – Textile businessman and political activist
- Ernest T. Weir – Chairman and CEO of the National Steel Corporation (1929-1957)
- Charles M. White – Chairman and CEO of Republic Steel (1956-1960)
- Robert E. Wood – Chairman of Sears, Roebuck and Co. (1939-1954), Chairman of the America First Committee (1940-1941)

=== Politicians ===
- Pat Buchanan – White House Communications Director (1985-1987)
- Joseph McCarthy – Chairman of the Senate Government Operations Committee (1953-1957), United States senator from Wisconsin (1947-1957)
- Robert A. Taft – Senate Majority Leader (1953), United States senator from Ohio (1939-1953)
- Donald Trump – 45th and 47th President of the United States (2017-2021, 2025-present), Co-Chairman of the New York Vietnam Veterans Memorial Commission (1982-1985), Chairman of The Trump Organization (1971-2017)

=== Publicists ===
- Samuel Crowther – Journalist, publicist, and writer
- Robert R. McCormick – Editor-in-chief of the Chicago Tribune (1914-1955)

== Notable organizations ==
=== Companies ===
- American Cyanamid
- Dodge Brothers Company
- E. I. du Pont de Nemours and Company
- Ford Motor Company
- George A. Hormel & Company
- Hunt Production Company
- National Steel Corporation
- Pennzoil Co.
- Quaker State Corporation
- Republic Steel Corporation
- Sears, Roebuck, and Company
- Sun Oil Company
- Southern Union Company

=== Movements and parties ===
- Old Guard (Republican Party)
- Make America Great Again movement (2015-present)

=== Organizations ===
- America First Committee
- American Liberty League
- John Birch Society
- National Association of Manufacturers
- Sentinels of the Republic
- United States Business and Industry Council
- United States Chamber of Commerce

=== Publications ===
- Chicago Tribune

== Criticism ==
According to progressive scholar Mark Rupert, the critique of globalisation offered by business nationalists is fundamentally flawed and carried significant social risks. Rupert argues that the right-wing anti-globalists worldview "envisions a world in which Americans are uniquely privileged, inheritors of a divinely inspired socio-political order which must at all costs be defended against external intrusions and internal subversion.”

Rupert further argues that this reactionary analysis attempts to challenge corporate power but ultimately fails to understand the underlying economic structure, specifically the nature of "capital concentration and the transnational socialization of production." This lack of comprehension in the reactionary analysis then contributes to societal issues: It fosters social alienation (a feeling of being disconnected or isolated), and it intensifies "scapegoating and hostility toward those seen as outside of, different or dissenting from its vision of national identity."

Rupert concludes that as alienation grows, more overtly fascistic forces will try to draw these angry individuals into a framework that justifies the demonization (making someone loos evil) of the chosen "Other."

Investigative reporter Chip Berlet argues:

When populist consumer groups, such as those led by Ralph Nader, forge uncritical alliances with business nationalists to rally against GATT and NAFTA, an opportunity emerges for the anti-elite rhetoric of right-wing populism to piggyback onto a legitimate progressive critique. Why is this a problem? Business nationalism carries with it its right-wing baggage. Pat Buchanan’s rhetoric is an example of this baggage. His racist, antisemitic and xenophobic inclinations reflect business nationalism's right-wing national chauvinism. At the core of the right wing, populism is the "producerist narrative" where the main scapegoats are people of color, especially Blacks. This narrative diverts attention from the White supremacist subtext. It uses coded language to mobilize resentment against people of color through attacks on issues immediately relevant to them, such as welfare, immigration, tax, or education policies. Women, gay men and lesbians, abortion providers, youth, students, and environmentalists are also frequently scapegoated in this manner.

== See also ==
- Alt-right
- Anti-globalization movement
- Business Plot
- Corporate nationalism
- Economic nationalism
- Isolationism
- Nativism (politics)
- Paleoconservatism
- Producerism
- Protectionism
- Right-wing populism
