= Samuel Crowther (journalist) =

American journalist

FREcon Samuel Crowther
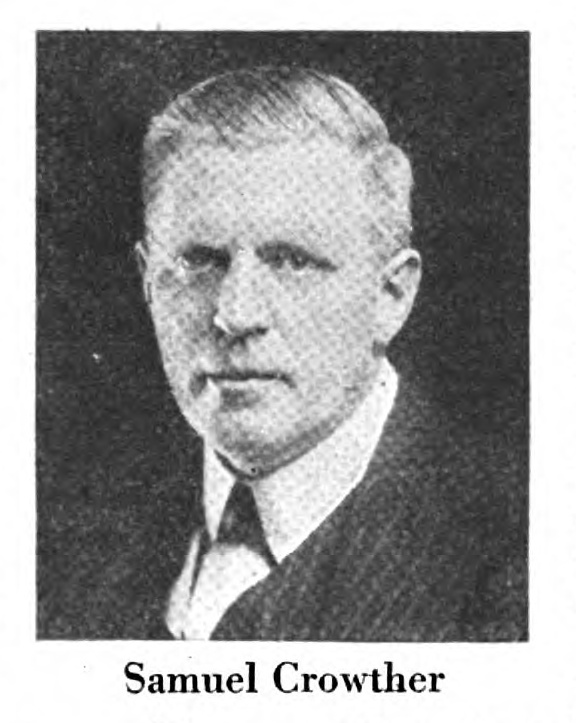
- Crowther in 1924
- Born: Samuel Crowther junior June 14, 1880; Philadelphia, Pennsylvania, US
- Died: October 27, 1947 (aged 67); Boston, Massachusetts, US
- Education: University of Pennsylvania (BS, LLB)
- Occupations: Writer; journalist; biographer
- Spouse: Mary Jane Owens
- Children: two sons and one daughter
- Writing career
- Genre: Non-fiction
- Subjects: Biography; business; economics
- Movement: Business nationalism

Samuel Crowther (1880–1947) was a prominent American journalist and writer who is best known for his collaborative writings with Henry Ford and other industrialists.

== Life ==
Crowther was born on June 14, 1880, in Philadelphia, Pennsylvania, to Samuel and Catherine Orr Crowther. He was educated at the Friends Select School in Philadelphia and graduated B.S. (1901) and LL.B. (1904) at the University of Pennsylvania.

In college, he won his varsity letters in football and rowing and was a member of the university's crew that distinguished itself in the Henley Regatta. In 1905, his "American Rowing," the first history of the sport in that country, was published. He dedicated his writing career to publishing biographies of famous industrialists and collaborating with some of them to produce works that conveyed their ideas to the public. The most prominent and enduring collaboration was with Henry Ford, the car manufacturer.

He married Mary Jane Owens on November 21, 1914, and they had two sons and a daughter. He died in Boston, Massachusetts on October 27, 1947.

In 1913, he began his career as a journalist with The Boston Post. In 1918–1919 he represented The New York Tribune and System Magazine in England and Germany. During his journalistic career he interviewed many of America's industrial leaders. He also made contributions to Country Gentleman, World's Work, Saturday Evening Post, Ladies' Home Journal, and others. Beginning in 1932, he was associated with the United States Steel Corporation in an advisory capacity.

== Professional memberships ==
- Fellow of the Royal Economic Society
- Member of American Economic Association
- Member of American Statistical Society

== Publications ==
- Rowing and Track Athletics (Rowing by S Crowther; Track Athletics by Arthur Ruhl) [With plates], New York: Macmillan Co., 1905. A volume of the American Sportsman's Library.
- Common Sense and Labour. London & Garden City, N.Y.: Sir Isaac Pitman & Sons, 1920.
- Why Men strike. London & Garden City, N.Y.: George G. Harrap and Co., [1920.]
- The Book of Business. Edited by Samuel Crowther. New York: P.F. Collier & son company, 1920.
- The First Million the Hardest. An autobiography By Arthur B. Farquhar (1838–1925), in collaboration with Samuel Crowther. Garden City, N.Y.: Doubleday, Page & Co.: 1922.
- John H Patterson: Pioneer in Industrial Welfare [With plates, including portraits]. Garden City, N.Y.: Doubleday, Page & Co., 1923.
- The Romance and Rise of the American Tropics. [Illustrated]. Garden City, NY: Doubleday, Doran & Co., 1929.
- $970,000,000 minus. A second primer. The results of a year of simple arithmetic, etc [On the foreign trade of the USA]. New York: Chemical Foundation, 1936.

=== Collaborative publications ===
- Tennis for Women. (Illustrated from photographs), Molla Bjurstedt and Samuel Crowther, London: Curtis Brown, 1916.
- My Life and Work. By Henry Ford, in collaboration with Samuel Crowther. London: William Heinemann & Co., 1922.
- Today and Tomorrow. By Henry Ford, in collaboration with Samuel Crowther. London: William Heinemann & Co., 1926.
- Moving Forward. By Henry Ford in collaboration with Samuel Crowther, Garden City, N.Y.: Doubleday, Doran & Co.,1930.
- My Friend Mr Edison By Henry Ford, with Samuel Crowther [With plates]. London: Ernest Benn, 1930.
- Men and Rubber: The story of business. By Harvey Samuel Firestone, in collaboration with Samuel Crowther. London: William Heinemann & Co., 1926.
- Why Quit Our Own. By George Nelson Peek with Samuel Crowther [On the desirability of a balanced domestic economy in the United States]. New York: D. Van Nostrand Co., 1936.
