= Emergency Tariff of 1921 =

United States federal law

- Long title: An Act Imposing temporary duties upon certain agricultural products to meet present emergencies, and to provide revenue; to regulate commerce with foreign countries; to prevent dumping of foreign merchandise on the markets of the United States; to regulate the value of foreign money; and for other purposes.
- Enacted by: the 67th United States Congress
- Effective: May 27, 1921

Citations
- Public law: Pub. L. 67–10
- Statutes at Large: Sess I, ch. 14, 42 Stat. 9–19

Legislative history
- Introduced in the House as H.R. 2435 by ? on ?; Committee consideration by ?; Passed the House on April 15, 1921 (269–111); Passed the Senate on May 11, 1921 (63–28); Reported by the joint conference committee on May ?, 1921; agreed to by the Senate on May 20, 1921 (53–25) and by the House on May 23, 1921 (246–98); Signed into law by President Warren G. Harding on May 27, 1921

The Emergency Tariff of 1921 of the United States was enacted on May 27, 1921. The Underwood Tariff, passed under the Presidency of Woodrow Wilson, had Republican leaders in the United States Congress rush to create a temporary measure to ease the plight of farmers until a better solution could be put into place. With growing unrest in the American public, President Warren G. Harding and Congress passed the tariff.

There was a high demand for American agricultural products during World War I, due to the serious disruption of European agriculture throughout the war years. In the aftermath of World War I, the European demand for American farm products declined, and the prices plummeted. Many farmers found themselves unable to meet their loan repayments. Additionally, overproduction was depressing the profitability of the agriculture industry. With falling prices, low demand, and overproduction, farmers faced a serious problem. The Emergency Tariff raised duties on most imported agricultural products, such as corn, wheat, sugar, wool, and meat.

== Causes ==
In the 1920s, the most disconcerting economic issue was declining farm profits. From 1900 to 1920, American farmers had prospered while European agriculture suffered serious disruption during World War I, which made prices soar.

In 1919, Europeans began to close their markets by implementing tariff barriers. The period of American agricultural prosperity caused by rising demand had ended by the early 1920s. While American farms continued to grow because of previous wartime price and technological advances, the European demand for American farm products declined, and prices plummeted.

Wheat price fell from $2.50 to under $1.00 a bushel by late 1921. Many farmers found themselves unable to meet their loan repayments. Additionally, overproduction was depressing the profitability of the agriculture industry. With falling prices, low demand, and overproduction, farmers faced a serious problem.

The Emergency Tariff raised duties on most imported agricultural products, such as corn, wheat, sugar, wool, and meat.

== Effects ==
The Emergency Tariff increased rates on wheat, sugar, meat, wool, and other agricultural products brought into the United States from foreign nations, which provided protection for domestic producers of those items. Farm state representatives saw the tariff as only the first step in a campaign for permanent protection and more government aid. The enaction of the protectionist tariff was an attempt to diffuse the postwar recession. When the tariff was first discussed in January 1921, the records of commerce revealed that the US exported that month over 60,000,000 pounds of cottonseed oil to the countries of Europe. Six months later, exports to Europe had been reduced to between 5,000,000 and 10,000,000 pounds monthly.

The measure remained in effect until the enactment of the Fordney–McCumber Tariff in 1922, one year after the Emergency Tariff was passed. The new, permanent tariff raised the rates even higher. Also in 1922, the Capper–Volstead Act was passed; it was designed to protect farm co-operatives by exempting them from antitrust laws.

The Report on the Emergency Tariff stated that the effects of the emergency duties had been obscured by the great change in prices of all commodities in the past 18 months (since it had gone into effect). When the Act became effective, the US and the rest of the world were in the midst of the greatest price decline that had occurred over many years.

In fall and winter 1921, a revival set in, and the price index went up about 20 points. That rise in the price index must be considered when the effect of the emergency tariff is studied. The report stated that after the passage of the act, prices practically never rose immediately.

It was also noted that in some cases, a decrease of imports, as well as a continued decline in agricultural prices in the US, preceded the enactment of the emergency law.

== List of taxed items ==
Wheat: wheat flour and semolina; flaxseed: corn; beans; peanuts or ground beans; potatoes, onions, rice, rice flour, and rice meal; lemons; peanut, cottonseed, coconut, soya bean, and olive oil; cattle, sheep, fresh and frozen beef, veal, mutton, lamb, and pork; meats of all kinds of prepared or preserved, not specifically provided for; cotton having a staple of one and three-eighths inches or more in length; manufactures of such cotton; wool, other than carpet wool; such wool when advanced in manufacture; sugars and molasses; butter and substitutes therefor; cheese and substitutes therefor; fresh, preserved, and condensed milk; sugar of milk; cream; wrapper tobacco; apples; cherries; and olives.
