= George Peek =

American agricultural economist (1873–1943)

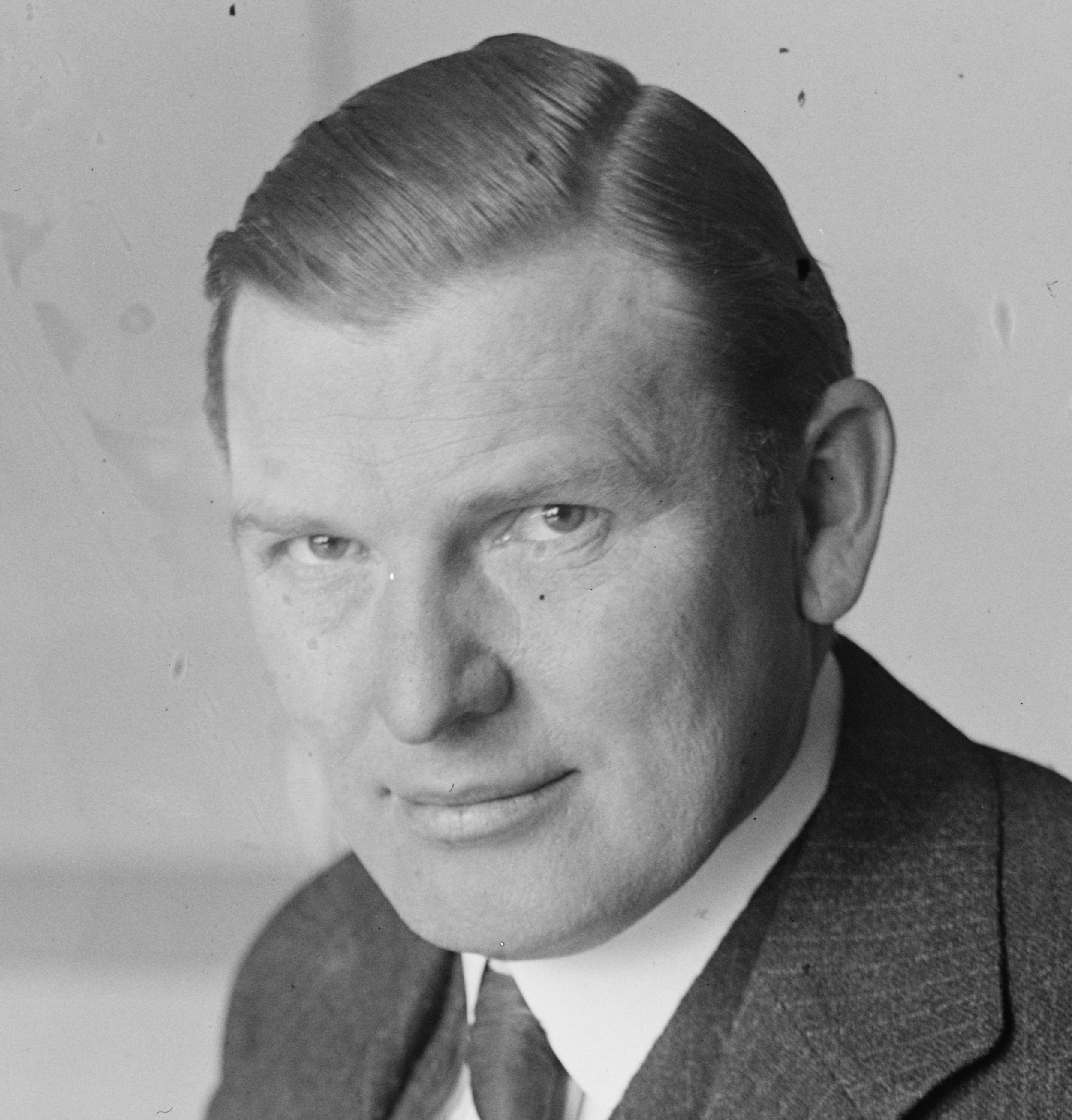
- Born: George Nelson Peek; November 19, 1873; Polo, Illinois, U.S.
- Died: December 17, 1943 (aged 70); Rancho Santa Fe, California, U.S.
- Occupations: Economist; business executive; civil servant
- Spouse: Georgia Peek

George Nelson Peek (November 19, 1873 – December 17, 1943) was an American agricultural economist, business executive, and civil servant. He was the first administrator of the Agricultural Adjustment Administration (AAA) and the first president of the two banks that would become the Export-Import Bank of the United States.

== Early life and business career ==
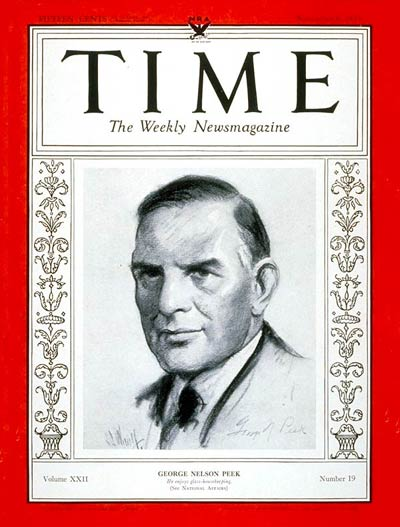
George Nelson Peek on the cover of Time magazine on Nov 6, 1933

Peek was born in Polo, Illinois, on November 19, 1873; His father was a farmer. Peek graduated from Oregon High School in Oregon, Illinois. He attended Northwestern University from 1891 to 1892, but did not graduate.

He joined the Deere & Webber Company of Minneapolis in 1893, and was named vice president of the John Deere Plow manufacturing division in Omaha, Nebraska, in 1901. In 1911, he was named president of the Deere & Co. subsidiary in Moline, Illinois. In 1919, he left Deere & Co. and became president of the Moline Plow Company, where he earned the relatively large salary of $100,000 a year. He immediately hired retired Brigadier General Hugh S. Johnson as the company's general counsel. Peek and Johnson were deeply interested in farm economics, especially since the post-World War I recession. Peek and Johnson became strong advocates of the McNary–Haugen Farm Relief Bill, proposed federal legislation which would have established the first national system of price supports for agriculture.

Peek was a member of the War Industries Board during World War I, and after the war was a member of the Industrial Board advising the United States Department of Commerce on post-war reconversion. In 1923, he was awarded the Distinguished Service Medal by the War Department for his wartime service.

== New Deal ==
When the Republican Party refused to support the legislation, Peek became a Democrat. His support for the McNary-Haugen bill led President Franklin D. Roosevelt to appoint him administrator of the Agricultural Adjustment Administration (AAA) in 1933.

Peek had sought the U.S. Secretary of Agriculture position, but it had gone to Henry A. Wallace. Instead, Bernard Baruch, who knew Peek from their service on the War Industries Board, convinced Roosevelt to put Peek in charge of the AAA.

Peek fought with Wallace over the administration of the agency. Peek asked Roosevelt to make the AAA an independent agency, rather than part of the United States Department of Agriculture; Wallace convinced Roosevelt to deny the request. Peek demanded full authority to run the AAA; Wallace withheld it. Wallace installed Jerome Frank, a liberal young lawyer whom Peek loathed, as the AAA's general counsel.

Peek also disagreed with one of the three fundamental programs created by the Agricultural Adjustment Act, which created three programs designed to boost farm prices. It established marketing programs designed to increase the purchase of American agricultural products overseas. It established a system of price supports. It established a system of incentives to discourage overproduction.

For farmers to participate in the price support program, they had to agree to cut production. Peek was adamantly opposed to the production quotas, which he saw as a form of socialism. Instead, Peek preferred to promote informal cartels of large producers and large food processing companies, which would collude to boost prices, but Wallace repeatedly denied Peek the authority to institute such cartels.

When the Commodity Credit Corporation was established in the early fall of 1933, Roosevelt refused to make it part of the AAA out of concern for Peek's attitudes. On November 15 and again on November 25, Peek demanded that Wallace fire Frank for insubordination; Wallace refused and threatened to have one of Peek's most trusted aides fired instead. In early December 1933, while Wallace was out of town, Peek announced a marketing program designed to sell American butter in Europe at rates below the national domestic price. Rexford Tugwell, acting secretary of agriculture in Wallace's absence, rescinded the program. Wallace quickly convinced many of Roosevelt's top advisors to ask for Peek's resignation. Tugwell himself threatened to resign if Peek were not fired.

Faced with a united front, Peek resigned from the AAA on December 11, 1933. One reporter called the forced resignation "the coolest political murder that has been committed since Roosevelt came into office." The same day, President Roosevelt named Peek his special advisor on foreign trade.

Roosevelt created the Export-Import Bank of Washington by executive order on February 2, 1934, and named Peek president of the bank. Roosevelt created a Second Export-Import Bank of Washington by executive order on March 9 and named Peek president of the second bank as well.

Peek's tenure at the Export-Import Bank was also short-lived. He clashed repeatedly with U.S. Secretary of State Cordell Hull over a series of reciprocal trade agreements in 1935, and resigned from the bank on December 2, 1935.

In 1936, he published a book on economic matters, Why Quit Our Own, which he co-authored with Samuel Crowther.

== Retirement and death ==
Peek retired to Rancho Santa Fe, California, in 1937 with his wife, Georgia. He rejoined the Republican Party, and supported Alf Landon in the 1936 presidential election.

Peek died at his home in Rancho Santa Fe on December 17, 1943. He was survived by his wife.

During his lifetime, Peek received numerous awards and honors, including the Distinguished Service Medal, the Légion d'honneur, the Belgian Order of the Crown, and the Order of the Crown of Italy.

== Notes ==
Awards and achievements
Preceded by Maxim Weygand	Cover of Time magazine November 6, 1933	Succeeded by Football
