= United States Business and Industry Council =

The United States Business and Industry Council (USBIC) is an NGO lobbying on behalf of family-owned and closely held US manufacturing companies. It was founded in 1933 as the Southern States Industrial Council, playing a major role in segregationist campaigns, before moving its headquarters to Washington D.C. in the 1980s.

== Mission ==
The mission of the USBIC is "to expand our domestic economy, with particular emphasis on our manufacturing, processing, and fabricating industries, and through the resulting growth to extend a high standard of living to all Americans."
