= McNary–Haugen Farm Relief Bill =

Unsuccessful American bill

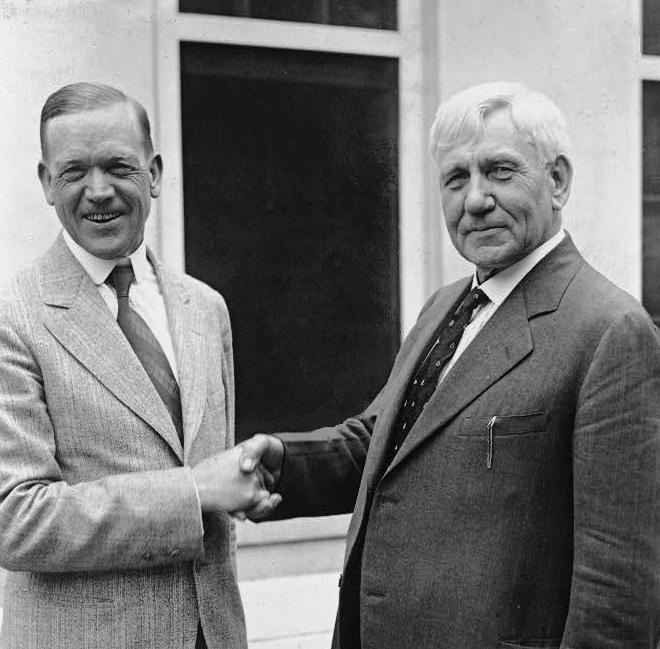
Bill sponsors McNary and Haugen in 1929

The McNary–Haugen Farm Relief Act, which never became law, was a controversial plan in the 1920s to subsidize American agriculture by raising the domestic prices of five crops. The plan was for the government to buy each crop and then store it or export it at a loss. It was co-authored by Charles L. McNary (R-Oregon) and Gilbert N. Haugen (R-Iowa). Despite attempts in 1924, 1926, 1927, and 1928 to pass the bill, it was vetoed by President Calvin Coolidge, and not approved. It was supported by Secretary of Agriculture Henry Cantwell Wallace and Vice President Charles Dawes.

According to the bill, a federal agency would be created to support and protect domestic farm prices by attempting to maintain price levels that existed in 1910-1914. By purchasing surpluses and selling them overseas, the federal government would take losses that would be paid for through fees against farm producers.

== Background ==
The war had created an atmosphere of high prices for agricultural products as European nations demand for exports surged. Farmers had enjoyed a period of prosperity as U.S. farm production expanded rapidly to fill the gap left as European belligerents found themselves unable to produce enough food. Farmers assumed prices would remain high. In 1919 after the war ended, the supply in Europe increased rapidly as many ex-soldiers returned to their farms. Overproduction led to plummeting prices which led to stagnant market conditions and living standards for farmers in the 1920s. Worse, hundreds of thousands of farmers had taken out mortgages and loans to buy new equipment and land to expand and were now unable to meet the financial burden. The cause was the collapse of land prices after the wartime bubble when farmers used high prices to buy up neighboring farms at high prices, saddling them with heavy debts. Farmers, however, blamed the decline of foreign markets and the effects of the protective tariff. They demanded relief as the agricultural depression grew steadily worse in the middle 1920s while the rest of the economy flourished. Instability in the agricultural marketplace in the mid-1920s kept the bill afloat, along with other plans for government-implemented price and wage controls in various industries.

== Bill ==
A plan suggested by George Peek and Hugh S. Johnson, of the Moline Plow Company, called for new tariffs to protect farmers from foreign producers and a federal program for price supports. Wallace and Henry C. Taylor, head of the Bureau of Agricultural Economics, rallied behind the plan, which formed the basis for the bill introduced by McNary of Oregon and Representative Haugen of Iowa, both Republicans. The basic idea of the bill was an equalization fee. The government was to segregate the amounts required for domestic consumption from the exportable surplus. The former were to be sold at the higher domestic price (the world price plus the tariff), using the full advantage of the tariff rates on exportable farm products, and the latter at the world price. The difference between the higher domestic price and the world price received for the surplus was to be met by the farmers of each commodity in the form of a tax or equalization fee, which would be paid by American consumers in the form of higher food prices.

The legislation was before Congress from 1924 to 1928. It received powerful and united support from agricultural interests in 1927 and in 1928, respectively, when it passed both houses. Gleason (1958) shows that most leading businessmen opposed the bill on the grounds that it was contrary to economic law and would cost money and involve the government in business. Farmers were urged to reduce production, practice crop diversification, and support the cooperative movement. The plan was opposed also on the moral ground that it would destroy the farmer's self-reliance.

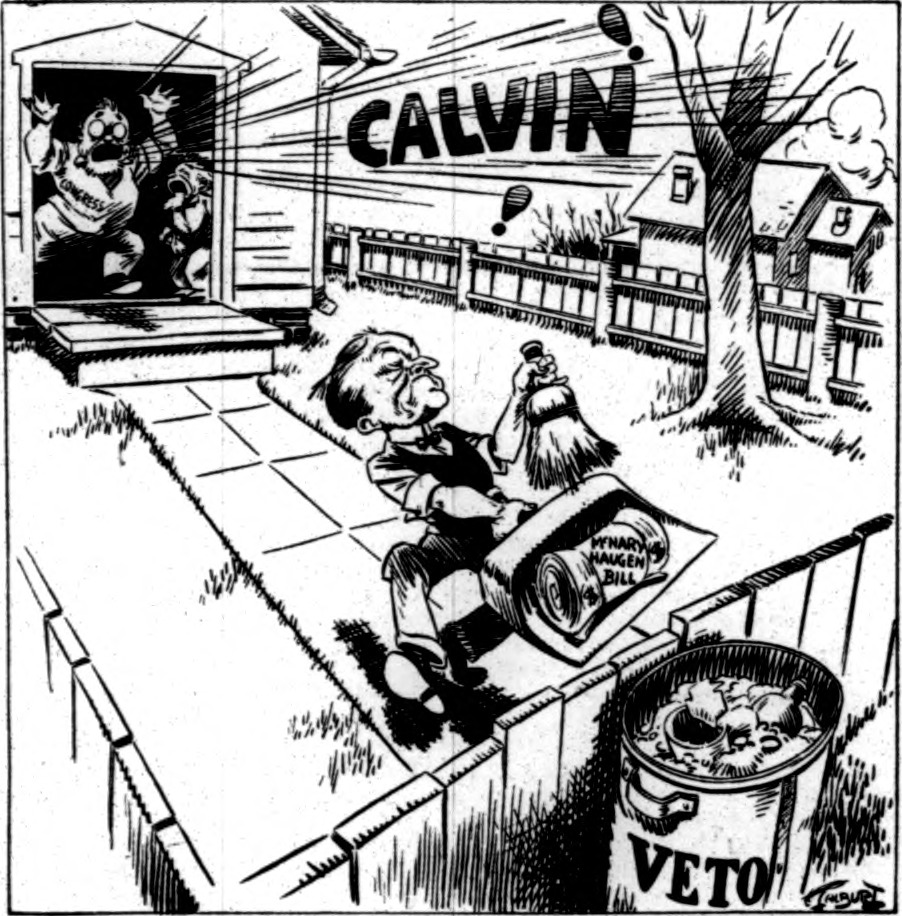
Political cartoon by H. M. Talburt, depicting President Coolidge vetoing the bill

President Calvin Coolidge listened to business and killed the bill twice with vigorous vetoes. Coolidge instead supported the alternative program of Commerce Secretary Herbert Hoover and Agriculture Secretary William M. Jardine to modernize farming, by bringing in more electricity, more efficient equipment, better seeds and breeds, more rural education, and better business practices. Hoover advocated the creation of a Federal Farm Board, which was dedicated to restriction of crop production to domestic demand, behind a tariff wall, and he maintained that the farmer's ailments were because of defective distribution. Coolidge finally committed himself to a farm board plan for price stabilization by co-operatives. Rejecting the McNary–Haugen plan, so popular in Congress, the Hoover plan was adopted in 1929.

As president of Kansas State Agricultural College from 1918, Jardine developed a free-market program of education and co-operative marketing for Kansas farmers. His advice was increasingly sought in Washington and led in 1922 to the formation of the Bureau of Agricultural Economics, meant to assist farm cooperatives. As Secretary of Agriculture after 1925, after the death of Wallace, Jardine made proposals that offered relief for farmers but preserved a free market, which led to Hoover's Agricultural Marketing Act of 1929, too far into the worsening farm crisis to succeed after the onset of the Great Depression.

Henry Agard Wallace, the son of the elder Wallace, was furious over Coolidge's vetoes of the McNary–Haugen Bill and supported Alfred E. Smith against Hoover for the presidency in 1928. He was pleased by enactment of the Agricultural Marketing Act in the Hoover administration but cited its lack of provisions for checking overproduction, and he wrote hard-hitting editorials against the Hawley–Smoot Tariff, which passed in 1930. The younger Wallace established himself as the preeminent Farm Belt leader, wrote the major farm speech of the Franklin D. Roosevelt presidential campaign, and in 1933, he became Secretary of Agriculture in his father's footsteps.

Porter (2000) follows the growth of activity among the Iowa Farm Bureau Federation (IFBF) membership and leadership on behalf of the legislation. It was the first farm organization to endorse the McNary–Haugen plan and also supported other groups working toward the plan's passage and paid the costs of sending its president, Charles E. Hearst, to Washington on extended lobbying trips. Though the legislation ultimately failed, twice in Congress and twice by presidential veto, the adoption of the idea by mainstream farm organizations laid the groundwork for farmer support of New Deal farm policy, where they applauded Roosevelt's appointment of Peek and Johnson, authors of the McNary–Haugen plan, as well as advocate Wallace Jr. to powerful positions, where they began large-scale subsidy programs.

== Bibliography ==
- Black, John D. "The McNary-Haugen Movement." American Economic Review 18.3 (1928): 406-427. online
- Fite, Gilbert C. George N. Peek and the Fight for Farm Parity University of Oklahoma Press, 1990, 314 pp.
- Gleason, John Philip. "The Attitude of the Business Community Toward Agriculture During the McNary–Haugen Period." Agricultural History 1958 32(2): 127-138. online
- Hamilton, David E. From New Day to New Deal: American Farm Policy from Hoover to Roosevelt, 1928-1933. 1991. 333 pp.
- Harstad, Peter T. and Lindemann, Bonnie. Gilbert N. Haugen: Norwegian-American Farm Politician. State Historical Society of Iowa, 1992. 232 pp.
- Koerselman, Gary H. "Secretary Hoover and National Farm Policy: Problems of Leadership." Agricultural History 1977 51(2): 378-395. online
- Porter, Kimberly K. "Embracing the Pluralist Perspective: the Iowa Farm Bureau Federation and the McNary–Haugen Movement." Agricultural History 2000 74(2): 381-392. online
- Saloutos, Theodore and John Hicks. Twentieth Century Populism: Agricultural Discontent in the Middle West 1900-1939 (1951) pp 321–41.
- Schapsmeier, E. L., and F.H. Schapsmeier. Henry A. Wallace of Iowa: The Agrarian years 1910-1940 (Iowa State UP, 1968).
- Soth, Lauren. "Henry Wallace and the farm crisis of the 1920s and 1930s." Annals of Iowa 47.2 (1983): 195-214 online.
- Wijkman, Per Magnus. "Henry C. Wallace and Henry A. Wallace as Secretaries of Agriculture: The Importance of Presidential Support." The American Economist 64.2 (2019): 306-324.
- Williams, C. Fred. "William M. Jardine and the Foundations for Republican Farm Policy, 1925-1929." Agricultural History 1996 70(2): 216-232. online
