= Fordney–McCumber Tariff =

1922 historical U.S. tariff

Tariff Act of 1922
- Long title: An Act to provide revenue, to regulate commerce with foreign countries, to encourage the industries of the United States, and for other purposes.
- Nicknames: Fordney–McCumber Tariff
- Enacted by: the 67th United States Congress

Citations
- Public law: Pub. L. 67–318
- Statutes at Large: ch. 356, 42 Stat. 858

Legislative history
- Introduced in the House of Representatives as H.R. 7456 by Joseph W. Fordney R‑MI; Committee consideration by House Ways and Means, Senate Committee on Finance; Passed the House on July 21, 1921 (288–127); Passed the Senate on August 19, 1922 (48–25); Reported by the joint conference committee on September 12, 1922; agreed to by the House on September 13, 1922 (210–90) and by the Senate on September 19, 1922 (43–28); Signed into law by President Warren Harding on September 21, 1922

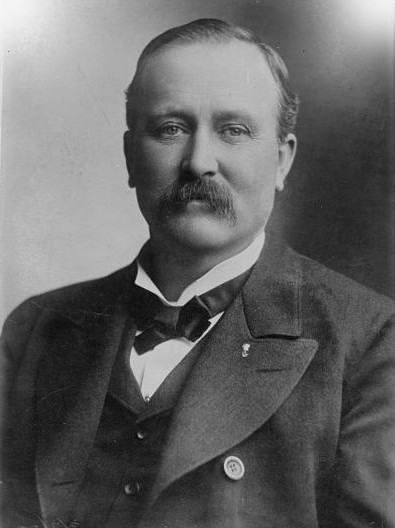
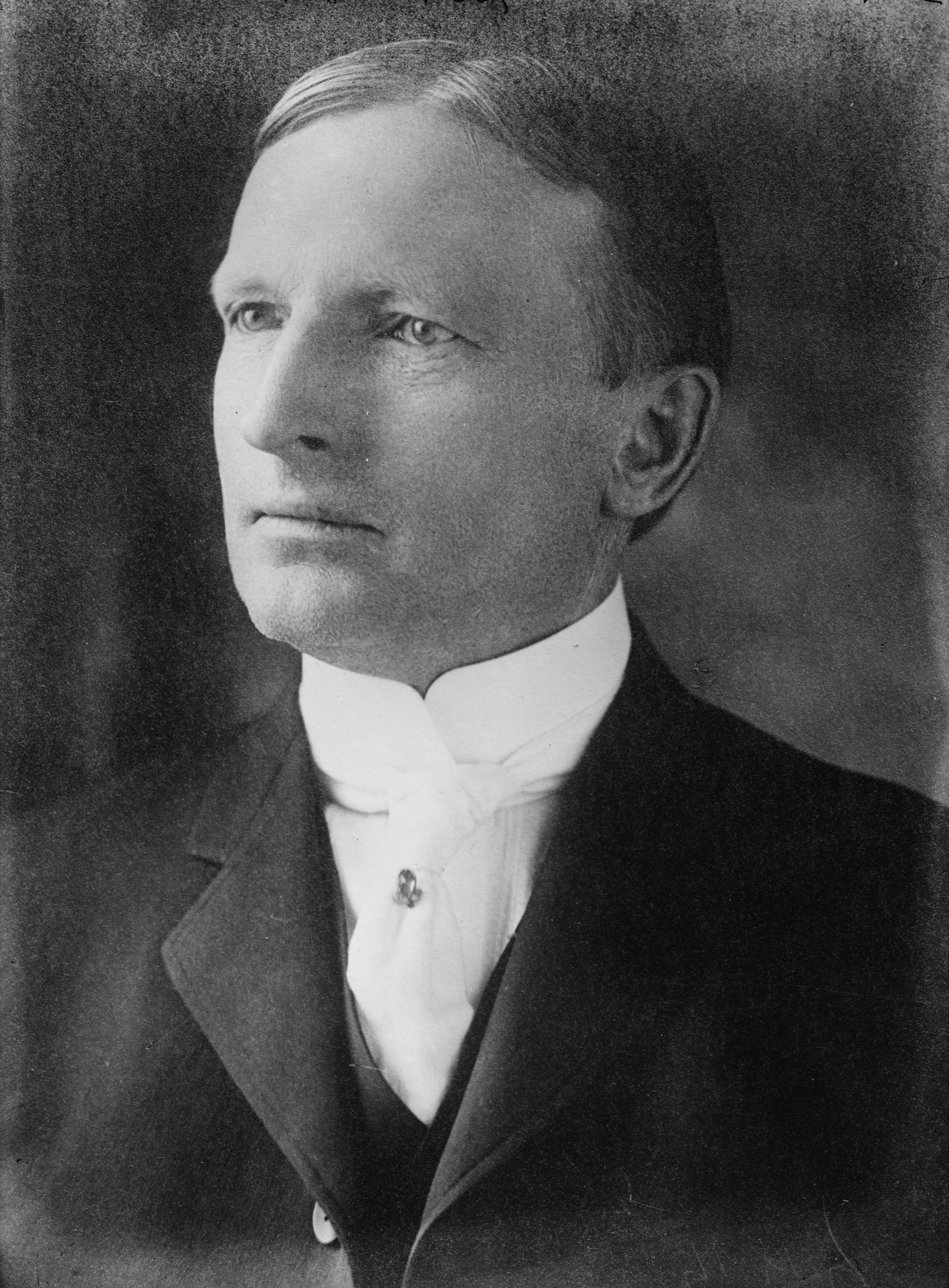
Rep. Joseph W. Fordney of Michigan (left) and Sen. Porter J. McCumber of North Dakota (right).

The Fordney–McCumber Tariff of 1922 was a law that raised American tariffs on many imported goods in order to protect factories and farms. The US Congress displayed a pro-business attitude in passing the tariff and in promoting foreign trade by providing huge loans to Europe. That, in turn, helped Europe to buy more US goods. However, five years after the passage of the tariff, American trading partners had raised their own tariffs by a significant degree. The French Third Republic raised its tariffs on automobiles from 45% to 100%, the Bourbon Restoration-era Spain raised its tariffs on American goods by 40%, and the Weimar Republic and Fascist Italy raised their tariffs on wheat. According to the American Farm Bureau, the American farmers lost more than $300 million annually as a result of this tariff.

== Background ==
The first sector of the economy that was hit by a fall in postwar demand was agriculture. During World War I, the American agricultural industry had enjoyed prosperity through the raising of prices, which led to increased output that Americans used to supply Europe.

Farmers borrowed heavily to expand their acreage and had difficulty paying back the loans when prices fell. Some of the postwar problems for American agriculture come from the great surplus of farm goods, which could not be absorbed in the national market as European countries had recovered sufficiently from the war, with their markets no longer requiring large quantities of American agricultural products.

Gross farm income in 1919 amounted to $17.7 billion. By 1921, exports to Europe had plummeted, and farm income fell to $10.5 billion. Other sectors of the economy wanted to avoid a similar fate. The 1920 election put the conservative pro-business and pro-farm Republicans in control of both Congress and the White House.

Hearings were held by Congress and led to the creation of several new tools of protection. One was the scientific tariff to equalize production costs among countries; no country could undercut the prices charged by American companies. The difference of production costs was calculated by the Tariff Commission.

Another was the American selling price; it allowed the President to calculate the duty, which was based on the price of the American price of a good, not the imported good.

The bill also gave the President the power to raise or lower rates on products if that was recommended by the Tariff Commission.

In September 1922, the Fordney–McCumber Tariff bill (named after Joseph Fordney, the chair of the House Ways and Means Committee, and Porter McCumber, the chair of the Senate Finance Committee) was signed by President Warren Harding. In the end, the tariff law raised the American ad valorem tariff rate to an average of about 38.5% for dutiable imports and an average of 14% overall. The tariff was defensive, rather than offensive, as it was determined by the cost of production and the market value.

== Economic effects ==
For agriculture, the tariff raised the purchasing power of the farmers by 2–3%, but other industries raised the price of some farm equipment. In September 1926, economic statistics released by farming groups revealed the rising cost of farm machinery.

For example, the average cost of a harness rose from $46 in 1918 to $75 in 1926, the 14-inch plow rose from $14 to $28, mowing machines rose from $45 to $95, and farm wagons rose from $85 to $150.

That triggered a tariff war against other European countries that traded with the United States. As US tariffs raised, those in other countries followed.

According to the American Farm Bureau, farmers lost more than $300 million annually as a result of the tariff.

== Reactions ==
The tariff was supported by the Republican Party and conservatives and was generally opposed by the Democratic Party, liberals, and progressives. One purpose of the tariff was to help those returning from World War I have greater job opportunities.

Trading partners complained immediately. European nations affected by the war sought access for their exports to the American market to make payments to the war loans from America. Democratic Representative Cordell Hull warned, "Our foreign markets depend both on the efficiency of our production and the tariffs of countries in which we would sell. Our own [high] tariffs are an important factor in each. They injure the former and invite the latter."

Five years after the passage of the tariff, American trading partners had raised their own tariffs by a significant degree. France raised its tariffs on automobiles from 45% to 100%, Spain raised its tariffs on American goods by 40%, and Germany and Italy raised their tariffs on wheat.

In 1928, Henry Ford attacked the tariff and argued that the American automobile industry did not need protection since it dominated the domestic market. Its main interest was now to expand foreign sales.

Some farmers opposed the tariff and blamed it for the agricultural depression. The American Farm Bureau Federation claimed that because of the tariff, the raised price of raw wool cost to farmers $27 million. Democratic Senator David I. Walsh challenged the tariff by arguing that the farmers were net exporters and so did not need protection. They depended on foreign markets to sell their surplus. Walsh pointed out that during the first year of the tariff, the cost of living climbed higher than any other year except during the war. He presented a survey of the Department of Labor in which all of the 32 cities that were assessed had seen an increase in the cost of living. For example, the food costs increased 16.5% in Chicago and 9.4% in New York. Clothing prices rose by 5.5% in Buffalo and 10.2% in Chicago.

Republican Frank W. Murphy, the head of the Minnesota Farm Bureau, also claimed that the problem was not in the world price of farm products but in the things that farmers had to buy.

== See also ==
- Revenue Act of 1913
- Emergency Tariff of 1921
- Smoot–Hawley Tariff Act of 1930
- Reciprocal Tariff Act of 1934
- International trade
- Protectionism

== General and cited sources ==
- Dollar, Charles M. (1973). "The South and the Fordney–McCumber Tariff of 1922: A Study in Regional Politics". Journal of Southern History. 39 (1): 45–66. doi:10.2307/2206791. JSTOR 2206791.
- Hayford, Marc; Pasurka, Carl A. Jr. (1992). "The Political Economy of the Fordney–McCumber and Smoot–Hawley Tariff Acts". Explorations in Economic History. 29 (1): 30–50. doi:10.1016/0014-4983(92)90031-Q.
- Kaplan, Edward S.; Ryley, Thomas W. (1994). Prelude to Trade Wars: American Tariff Policy, 1890–1922. Archived from the original on March 10, 2016 – via Questia.
- Kaplan, Edward S. (March 16, 2008). "The Fordney–McCumber Tariff of 1922". Robert Whaples, ed. EH.Net Encyclopedia.
- Kaplan, Edward S. (1996). American Trade Policy, 1923–1995. Westport, Connecticut: Greenwood Press. ISBN 0-313-29480-1.
- Rothgeb, John (2001). U.S. Trade Policy. Washington D.C.: CQ Press. ISBN 1-56802-522-X.
- Taussig, F. W. (1922). "The Tariff Act of 1922". Quarterly Journal of Economics. 37 (1): 1–28. doi:10.2307/1885907. JSTOR 1885907.
