= Valence populism =

Political ideology

Valence populism is a form of populist approach to politics that campaigns for widely approved issues. As a form of populism, it seeks to promote the interests of ordinary people. Unlike left-wing and right-wing populism, it lacks a consistent ideology and cannot be positioned on the left–right political spectrum. Instead, it promotes valence issues, that is, issues that many people support, such as anti-corruption, government transparency, democratic reform, and moral integrity. Valence populism is associated with anti-establishment sentiment and climate change denial. Technocratic populism is a variant of valence populism, while centrist populism has been identified as a similar concept.

The concept of valence populism was largely built by political scientist Mattia Zulianello. It has usually been found in parties in Central and Eastern Europe. Despite this, the best-known example is the Italian Five Star Movement. Other parties described as valence populists include the Bulgarian GERB, Croatian Human Shield, Slovak OĽaNO, Slovenian List of Marjan Šarec, and Ukrainian Servant of the People. Political parties such as the Czech ANO 2011, Norwegian Progress Party, and Alternative for Germany began as valence populist parties but later shifted towards right-wing populism. As of 2024, valence populist parties achieved their best result in the 2019 European Parliament election.

== Background ==
Populism is often defined as an idea within the framework of a liberal democracy that defines two core groups—"the people" and "the elite". Political scientists Robert A. Huber and Michael Jankowski noted that populism could be seen in many shapes and forms. They noted that "the elite" could be portrayed as establishment politicians, media, businessmen, or scientists. According to political scientist Cas Mudde, "the people" could also have several definitions, meaning that the group can be based on ethnic, national, or class lines. Populist rhetoric could also be combined with left-wing, right-wing, or centrist ideologies. Despite this, populism is a contested description among academics; there is no consensus among them on the definition of the concept of populism.

Several definitions of populism exist. Huber and Jankowski suggested that populism could be described as a "chameleon-like" concept, considering that it can be "used for many different purposes, [and] in different ways across the globe". According to Mudde's framework, which is the most recognised among scholars, populism is often combined with "thick ideologies" such as nationalism, socialism, or neoliberalism; the core populist concept of "the people" is being presented as a morally good force, while "the elite" is often portrayed as corrupt and self-serving. Michael Freeden argues that populism is unable to offer answers to socio-political questions and that to succeed, it therefore needs to be attached to an ideology, such as socialism or nationalism. Margaret Canovan suggested seven versions of populism, including "farmers' radicalism", represented by the U.S. Populist Party, "populist dictatorship", represented by Juan Perón, and "reactionary populism", represented by Enoch Powell.

== Definition ==
Political scientist Mattia Zulianello defines valence populism as a variant of populism that is attributed to parties that have an unclear positioning on the left–right political spectrum. They promote valence issues that are widely approved by voters, such as anti-corruption ideas, increased government transparency, democratic reform and integrity. Such parties place more importance on these issues than left-wing, right-wing, or centrist populists. Technocratic populism is a variant of valence populism. It promotes apolitical experts (technocrats) who seek to directly connect with "the people". Despite the concentration on valence issues, some valence populists may adopt stances on a limited range of ideological issues. Valence populism is associated with climate change denial.

Valence populist parties are neither left-wing, right-wing, nor centrist; they cannot be positioned on the political spectrum. They also purposely avoid showing clear positions regarding socio-cultural and economic issues and are often anti-establishment. "Their policy stances are primarily informed by an unadulterated conception of populism … and are therefore flexible, free-floating and, often, inconsistent", Zulianello has said. Together with political scientist Petra Guasti, Zulianello said that valence populists lack a "thick ideology" such as nativism or socialism, which is not the case for ideological populism. Valence populism also "rejects consistent ideologies". Because of this, the ideology of valence populists can be argued to be solely populism. This has led valence populism to being described as a "purer" form of populism and as ideologically neutral.

Zulianello has argued for the adoption of the term valence populism, considering that centrist populism "directly or indirectly refers to the ideological or geometric centre of the party system". He has also said that while issues such as anti-corruption are typically affiliated with centrist populism, he considers it misleading because valence issues lack a clear positioning and thus cannot be located in the political centre. Zulianello built on the definition from political scientist Kenneth M. Roberts, who said in 2018 that "some [populist] parties offer little more than … valence considerations" and thus cannot be defined as either left-wing or right-wing. Political scientist Eliška Drápalová has argued that valence populism is "well suited" for local politics due to local politics being "more direct, personalised, and unmediated".

== History ==
In political science, variants of populism, such as left-wing and right-wing populism and even centrist populism since the 2000s, have been discussed and distinguished. In regard to Europe, Zulianello noted that other political scientists argued that populist parties "primarily engage in positional competition" on the economic and socio-cultural axes. Zulianello disagreed with the approach that all populist parties can be positioned on the political spectrum. Parties that cannot be identified as either left or right were sometimes described as centrist populist or were placed in the "residual category". Zulianello and another political scientist, Erik Gahner Larsen, have discussed the exception to positioning populist parties. He has said that their approach has been largely theoretical. Zulianello coined the term valence populism in 2020. Valence populism has usually been found in political parties in Central and Eastern Europe.

In French, political scientists Chloé Alexandre and Gilles Ivaldi have called valence populism "consensual populism" (French: populisme consensuel), while in Italian, political scientist Matteo Giardiello called it "hybrid populism" (Italian: populismo ibrido) due to not being clearly identified with either the left or right sides of the political spectrum. Social psychologist Valerio Pellegrini described valence populism as an "innovative category". Researcher Frederik Henriksen has identified anti-systemic populism, a form of populism that combines anti-elitism with conspiracy theories and vaccine hesitancy, as being similar to valence populism. Aleš Michal noted that centrist populism and technocratic populism are similar concepts to valence populism and that there are significant overlaps in definitions of these terms. Political scientist Dani Filc listed Peronism, an ideology built around Argentinian leader Juan Perón, as a variant of populism that cannot be classified as either left-wing or right-wing. Political scientists Vladimír Naxera, Ondřej Stulík, and Vojtěch Kaše criticised the creation of new subdivisions of populism, including valence populism, due to the categories creating ambiguity in academic literature.

Considering that valence populism is more prevalent in Central and Eastern Europe, whose countries were not members of the European Union until the late 1990s, valence populism was not present in the European Parliament until then. The first valence populist parties entered the European Parliament in the 2004 election. These were the Austrian Hans-Peter Martin's List, which won one seat, and the Lithuanian Labour Party, which won five seats. The 2009 election also saw the Bulgarian GERB, another valence populist party, join the European Parliament. By 2014, valence populist parties had 28 seats in the European Parliament. Valence populist parties achieved their best result yet in the 2019 election, when six parties gained representation. During this period, valence populism also spread to Western Europe, particularly Italy and France, where the Five Star Movement (M5S) and Renaissance (RE, formerly La République En Marche !; LREM) achieved success.

During the COVID-19 pandemic, valence populist parties held varied positions regarding vaccination. In Europe, Slavi Trifonov of the Bulgarian There is Such a People and Ivan Pernar, formerly affiliated with the Croatian Human Shield (ŽZ), promoted conspiracy theories and opposed vaccination. On the other hand, in Australia, Jacqui Lambie of the Jacqui Lambie Network was supportive of the COVID-19 vaccination.

== Political parties ==
The Italian Five Star Movement is a common example of a valence populist party.

Zulianello and Larsen have compiled a list of valence populist parties using their dataset of varieties of populism from 1979 to 2019 and the 2019 Chapel Hill Expert Survey on political parties. Out of all listed political parties, the ŽZ had the highest rate of blurry positions on socio-cultural and economic issues in 2019. Regarding the reduction of political corruption as a priority, Slovak OĽaNO is listed as the party that holds the highest priority on the issue, followed by the Italian Five Star Movement (M5S) and ŽZ. GERB is listed on the bottom with regard to valence populist parties. Zulianello and Larsen have also both argued that the term valence populism fits better than centrist populism for OĽaNO, M5S, and Czech ANO 2011. In a 2023 article, Zulianello and Guasti listed ANO 2011, M5S, and OĽaNO as examples of valence populist parties. In a separate article, they named Jacqui Lambie Network as a valence populist party.

Regarding M5S, Zulianello has described it as "perhaps the best example" of valence populism; M5S cannot be positioned on the left–right political spectrum and is very ideologically flexible and eclectic. Pellegrini also said that M5S is valence populist due to their focus on non-ideological issues. Academic Gilda Sensales noted in 2024 that while M5S has also been described as left-wing populist, the research of Pellegrini and political scientists Núria Font, Paolo Graziano, and Myrto Tsakatika had M5S "in the middle of ... the classic left-right continuum of political orientation", and thus Sensales categorised M5S as a valence populist party instead.

Zulianello has also said that while GERB is a member of the European People's Party and defines itself as a centre-right and Christian-democratic party, it is still a valence populist party due to not following a particular ideology. On the other hand, ANO 2011 has presented itself as a technocratic party. Naxera, Stulík, and Kaše said that ANO 2011's leader Andrej Babiš showcased technocratic populist and valence populist tendencies. Together with author Kostiantyn Yanchenko, Zulianello also analysed the Ukrainian Servant of the People of Volodymyr Zelenskyy and concluded that SN is a valence populist party due to its focus on valence issues and blurry socio-cultural and economic issues. Sociologists and researchers Michel Perottino and Petra Guasti also identified Emmanuel Macron's LREM as valence populist due to focusing on technocratic issues and rejecting being positioned on either the left, right, or centre of the political spectrum. Political scientist Dragoș Dragoman described the Save Romania Union as a valence populist party, considering that it emphasises anti-corruption, government transparency and reformism. Michal described the Czech Public Affairs party as valence populist.

Huber, Jankowski, and Juen noted that the Norwegian Progress Party (FrP) also began as a valence populist party, having only campaigned on anti-tax and anti-elitist issues. FrP later began focusing on issues related to immigration and switched towards right-wing populism. They argued the same for Alternative for Germany due to initially campaigning solely on an anti-Euro platform before turning towards right-wing populism.

The following list includes political parties that have been labelled as valence populist:

- Australia: Jacqui Lambie Network
- Austria: Hans-Peter Martin's List
- Bulgaria: National Movement for Stability and Progress, GERB, Slavi Trifonov (Note: Trifonov is a politician, not a political party, though he formed his own political party, There is Such a People, in 2020. His previous project in 2019 was There Is no Such State, but was unregistered, thus Trifonov was listed instead in Zulianello's and Larsen's research.)
- Croatia: The Bridge, Human Shield
- Czech Republic: Public Affairs, ANO 2011
- France: Renaissance (formerly known as La République En Marche !)
- Germany: Alternative for Germany (formerly)
- Italy: Five Star Movement
- Latvia: For a Humane Latvia (formerly Who Owns the State?)
- Lithuania: Lithuanian Centre Party, Labour Party, National Resurrection Party
- Norway: Progress Party (formerly)
- Romania: People's Party – Dan Diaconescu, Save Romania Union
- San Marino: Civic 10
- Slovakia: Alliance of the New Citizen, OĽaNO
- Slovenia: List of Marjan Šarec
- Ukraine: Batkivshchyna, Servant of the People

== See also ==
- List of populists
- Single-issue politics

== Sources ==
=== Books ===
- Alexandre, Chloé; Ivaldi, Gilles (18 December 2023). "Débats autour des partis populistes" [Debates Around Populist Parties]. Partis politiques [Party Politics]. Bruylant. ISBN 978-2-8027-6753-4.
- Bruno, Valerio Alfonso (2022). "A Comparative Analysis of Populisms in Europe: exploring populist parties' ideological flexibility and ambiguity". Populism and Far-Right: Trends in Europe. EDUCatt. ISBN 978-88-9335-067-9.
- de la Torre, Carlos; Roberts, Kenneth M. (28 September 2018). "Left, right, and the populist structuring of political competition". Routledge Handbook of Global Populism (1 ed.). Routledge. ISBN 978-1-315-22644-6.
- Gorbach, Denys (15 March 2024). "Everyday Politics". The Making and Unmaking of the Ukrainian Working Class: Everyday Politics and Moral Economy in a Post-Soviet City. Berghahn Books. ISBN 978-1-80539-300-9.
- Huber, Robert A.; Jankowski, Michael (2025). Populism: An Introduction. Sage. ISBN 978-1-5296-6987-9.
- Mudde, Cas; Rovira, Cristóbal (2017). Populism: A Very Short Introduction. Oxford University Press. ISBN 978-0-19-023487-4.
- Sensales, Gilda (13 April 2024). "Political Manifestations and Core Beliefs of Populism". Political Psychology Perspectives on Populism. Springer Nature. ISBN 978-3-031-44073-1.
- Turner, Frederick (15 May 1983). "The Cycle of Peronism". Juan Peron and the Reshaping of Argentina. University of Pittsburgh Press. ISBN 978-0-8229-7636-3.

=== Journals ===
- Dragoman, Dragoș (2 July 2020). ""Save Romania" Union and the Persistent Populism in Romania". Problems of Post-Communism. 68 (4): 303–314. doi:10.1080/10758216.2020.1781540. ISSN 1557-783X.
- Driscoll, Daniel (February 2023). "Populism and Carbon Tax Justice: The Yellow Vest Movement in France". Social Problems. 70 (1): 143–163. doi:10.1093/socpro/spab036. ISSN 0037-7791.
- Giardiello, Matteo (2021). "Populismi digitali al tempo del Covid-19" [Digital Populism in the Time of Covid-19]. Rivista di Digital Politics (in Italian). 2 (1): 341–362. doi:10.53227/101947. ISSN 2785-0072.
- Huber, Robert A.; Jankowski, Michael; Juen, Christina-Marie (15 November 2022). "Populist Parties and the Two-Dimensional Policy Space". European Journal of Political Research. 62 (3): 989–1004. doi:10.1111/1475-6765.12569. ISSN 1475-6765.
- Kim, Jessica; Henry, Elizabeth A.; Carter, Jerrid; Soysal, Yasemin Nuhoğlu (4 August 2025). "Globalization, populism, and climate skepticism: untangling varieties and pathways". Environmental Sociology: 1–23. doi:10.1080/23251042.2025.2536342.
- Manucci, Luca (2021). "Forty Years of Populism in the European Parliament". População e Sociedade. 35: 25–42. doi:10.52224/21845263/rev35a2. hdl:10451/49128. ISSN 0873-1861.
- Michal, Aleš (4 December 2024). "Only Another Adjective, or Finally a New Functional Post-Ideological Subtype? A Conceptual Analysis of Valence Populism". Politics in Central Europe. 20 (4): 529–546. doi:10.2478/pce-2024-0023.
- Michal, Aleš (19 July 2025). "Moralism without populism? The salience of corruption in the electoral manifestos and legislature speeches of Czech and Slovak parties". Parliamentary Affairs. 78 (3): 603–624. doi:10.1093/pa/gsae036.
- Mudde, Cas (7 June 2021). "Populism in Europe: An Illiberal Democratic Response to Undemocratic Liberalism (The Government and Opposition/Leonard Schapiro Lecture 2019)". Government and Opposition. 56 (4): 577–597. doi:10.1017/gov.2021.15.
- Naxera, Vladimír; Kaše, Vojtěch; Stulík, Ondřej (8 August 2023). "'The More Populism Types You Know, the Better Political Scientist You Are?' Machine-Learning Based Meta-Analysis of Populism Types in the Political Science Literature". Journal of Contemporary European Studies. 32 (4): 1057–1074. doi:10.1080/14782804.2023.2244911.
- Pellegrini, Valerio (17 January 2023). "Populist Ideology, Ideological Attitudes, and Anti-Immigration Attitudes as an Integrated System of Beliefs". PLoS One. 18 (1) e0280285. Bibcode:2023PLoSO..1880285P. doi:10.1371/journal.pone.0280285. ISSN 1932-6203. PMC 9844902. PMID 36649283.
- Perottino, Michel; Guasti, Petra (2020). "Technocratic Populism à la Française? The Roots and Mechanisms of Emmanuel Macron's Success". Politics and Governance. 8 (4): 545–555. doi:10.17645/pag.v8i4.3412. ISSN 2183-2463.
- Reiser, Marion; Hebenstreit, Jorg (December 2020). "Populism Versus Technocracy? Populist Responses to the Technocratic Nature of the EU". Politics and Governance. 8 (4): 568–579. doi:10.17645/pag.v8i4.3361. ISSN 2183-2463.
- Spirova, Maria (26 June 2021). "Bulgaria: Political Developments and Data in 2020". European Journal of Political Research Political Data Yearbook. 60 (1): 49–57. doi:10.1111/2047-8852.12317. hdl:1887/3142366. ISSN 2047-8852.
- Yanchenko, Kostiantyn; Zulianello, Mattia (20 April 2023). "'Not Fighting Corruption, But Defeating It': The Populism of Zelensky's Servant of the People in Comparative Perspective". European Societies. 26 (2): 253–278. doi:10.1080/14616696.2023.2203214. ISSN 1469-8307.
- Zulianello, Mattia; Larsen, Erik Gahner (June 2021). "Populist Parties in European Parliament Elections: A New Dataset on Left, Right and Valence Populism from 1979 to 2019". Electoral Studies. 71 (1) 102312. doi:10.1016/j.electstud.2021.102312. ISSN 0261-3794.
- Zulianello, Mattia; Larsen, Erik Gahner (27 February 2023). "Blurred Positions: The Ideological Ambiguity of Valence Populist Parties". Party Politics. 30 (1): 190–199. doi:10.1177/13540688231161205. hdl:11368/3043758. ISSN 1354-0688.
- Zulianello, Mattia (24 July 2019). "Varieties of Populist Parties and Party Systems in Europe: From State-of-the-Art to the Application of a Novel Classification Scheme to 66 Parties in 33 Countries". Government and Opposition. 55 (2): 327–347. doi:10.1017/gov.2019.21. hdl:11368/3001222. ISSN 1477-7053.
- Zulianello, Mattia; Guasti, Petra (10 October 2023). "The Demand and Supply of Pandemic Populism: A Global Overview". Government and Opposition. 60 (2): 560–579. doi:10.1017/gov.2023.35.
- Zulianello, Mattia (2023). "Populist Parties in Central and Eastern Europe: Regional Trends in Comparative Perspective". Poliarchie / Polyarchies. Edizioni Università di Trieste: 58–73. doi:10.13137/2611-2914/35183. hdl:10077/35183. ISSN 2611-2914.

=== News articles ===
- Drápalová, Eliška (9 May 2023). "Lost in the Shuffle: Local Politics in Populism Studies". The Loop. European Consortium for Political Research. Archived from the original on 24 June 2024.
- Filc, Dani (6 September 2023). "Populism: Left or Right?". The Loop. European Consortium for Political Research. Archived from the original on 24 June 2024.
- Henriksen, Frederik (8 July 2024). "Anti-Systemic Populism During the Covid-19 Pandemic". The Loop. European Consortium for Political Research. Archived from the original on 9 July 2024.
- Manucci, Luca (23 September 2019). "Populist Parties as 'the New Normal'". Populism Observer. Archived from the original on 24 June 2024.
- Zulianello, Mattia; Guasti, Petra (21 March 2023). "Three Die-Hard Myths About Populism". The Loop. European Consortium for Political Research. Archived from the original on 24 June 2024.
