= Centrist populism =

Political ideology

Centrist populism is a form of populist approach to politics that does not rely on political ideologies, but also criticises the political establishment, while not being extremist. It is personalistic and anti-corruption oriented, while it also moderately criticises aspects of liberal democracy. Usually found in Central and Eastern Europe, it tends to be less supportive of the European Union, while avoiding nationalist, anti-Western, and anti-capitalist positions. Similar concepts to centrist populism include centrist anti-establishmentiarism, anti-establishment reformism, and valence populism.

Centrist populism emerged in Europe in the 1990s, with early examples being the Movement for a Democratic Slovakia. It later became more prominent in the early 2000s, particularly in Bulgaria and the Baltics. A third wave in the rise of centrist populism came after the 2008 financial crisis. Other prominent centrist populist parties include the National Movement for Stability and Progress in Bulgaria, Direction – Social Democracy in Slovakia, Labour Party in Lithuania, and Politics Can Be Different in Hungary. Political parties such as the Hungarian Fidesz and Polish Law and Justice were centrist populist before they shifted towards right-wing populism.

== Background ==
Populism is often defined as an idea within the framework of a liberal democracy that defines two core groups—"the people" and "the elite". Political scientists Robert A. Huber and Michael Jankowski noted that populism could be seen in many shapes and forms. They noted that "the elite" could be portrayed as establishment politicians, media, businessmen, or scientists. According to political scientist Cas Mudde, "the people" could also have several definitions, meaning that the group can be based on ethnic, national, or class lines. Populist rhetoric could also be combined with left-wing, right-wing, or centrist ideologies. Despite this, populism is a contested description among academics; there is no consensus among them on the definition of the concept of populism.

Several definitions of populism exist. Huber and Jankowski suggested that populism could be described as a "chameleon-like" concept, considering that it can be "used for many different purposes, [and] in different ways across the globe". According to Mudde's framework, which is the most recognised among scholars, populism is often combined with "thick ideologies" such as nationalism, socialism, or neoliberalism; the core populist concept of "the people" is being presented as a morally good force, while "the elite" is often portrayed as corrupt and self-serving. Michael Freeden argues that populism is unable to offer answers to socio-political questions and that to succeed, it therefore needs to be attached to an ideology, such as socialism or nationalism. Margaret Canovan suggested seven versions of populism, including "farmers' radicalism", represented by the U.S. Populist Party, "populist dictatorship", represented by Juan Perón, and "reactionary populism", represented by Enoch Powell.

== Definition ==
According to the political scientists Daniel Smilov and Ruzha Smilova, centrist, left-wing, and right-wing populism both originate from "democratic illiberalism". Centrist populists promote anti-establishment, personalistic, and anti-corruption views, while also moderately criticising liberal democracy. Despite this, the political scientists Zsolt Enyedi and Martin Mölder wrote that centrist populists do not pose a challenge to liberal democracy. Centrist populists attack the political mainstream while not being subscribed to extremist politics. They do not rely on any political ideologies, instead claiming that they are non-ideological and anti-political, while often emphasising increasing living standards. They also focus on issues such as competence and probity, rather than on socio-economic and socio-cultural political issues. They also tend to be less supportive of the European Union, and are less culturally conservative than right-wing populists. They are also less likely to employ welfare chauvinism in comparison with right-wing populists; they advocate for maintaining the existing welfare system.

Centrist populists are considered anti-establishment as they criticise large established political parties, which they perceive to not represent "the will of the people" due to alleged corruption. They additionally reject left- and right-wing ideologies, criticise aspects of liberal democracy such as separation of powers, independent bodies, and rule of law, and are sometimes mildly nationalistic, but they do not reject political pluralism. These positions are considered centrist as they are designed to be appealing to the majority of voters. Political scientists Vlastimil Havlík and Aneta Pinková disputed that centrist populists were nationalistic. Grigore Pop-Eleches also wrote that centrist populists avoid nationalism and anti-Western and anti-capitalist positions.

In the Czech Republic, centrist populists are also technocratic; they have argued that experts should run the government or that the government should be based on a business model. In the Central and Eastern Europe, centrist populists have also criticised the post-communist transition led by liberals. They argue that politics in Central and Eastern Europe will remain non-ideological and that parties would compete over issues such as competence and moral probity. The political scientist Elena Cossu, however, said that criticism of the post-communist transition is rather associated with right-wing populism and that centrist populists rather associate themselves with anti-corruption sentiment.

=== Similar concepts ===
In an article, the political scientists Sarah Engler, Bartek Pytlas, and Kevin Deegan-Krause used the term "centrist anti-establishment parties" to refer to anti-establishment parties who do not belong to right-wing or left-wing populism. Engler said that therefore parties with a centre-right or centre-left political platform could also be applied the "centrist anti-establishment party" label; the term is similar to centrist populism. She also explained that such parties are known for their anti-establishment and anti-corruption views; they differ from the radical right due to not promoting illiberal democracy, ethnocentrism, and social conservatism, and from the far-left due to not being anti-capitalist. They instead promote liberal democracy and the market economy.

The political scientists Seán Hanley and Allan Sikk also defined "anti-establishment reform parties" as a similar concept to centrist populism. They argue that such parties advocate for reforms of the political system, use anti-establishment rhetoric, and are "genuinely new", ie. they are not successors of any parliamentary party. Hanley and Sikk also added that such parties accept liberal democracy and the market economy, whilst not being subscribed to illiberal democracy and anti-capitalism.

Another similar concept, valence populism, was built by the political scientist Mattia Zulianello. He distinguishes valence populism from centrist populism for having unclear positioning on the left–right political spectrum. Zulianello said that the centrist populism term "refers to the ideological or geometric centre of the party system", while that valence populists promote "non-positional issues" such as anti-corruption, morality, democratic reform, and political transparency. They can also be technocratic.

== History ==
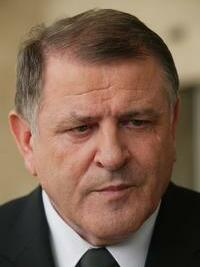
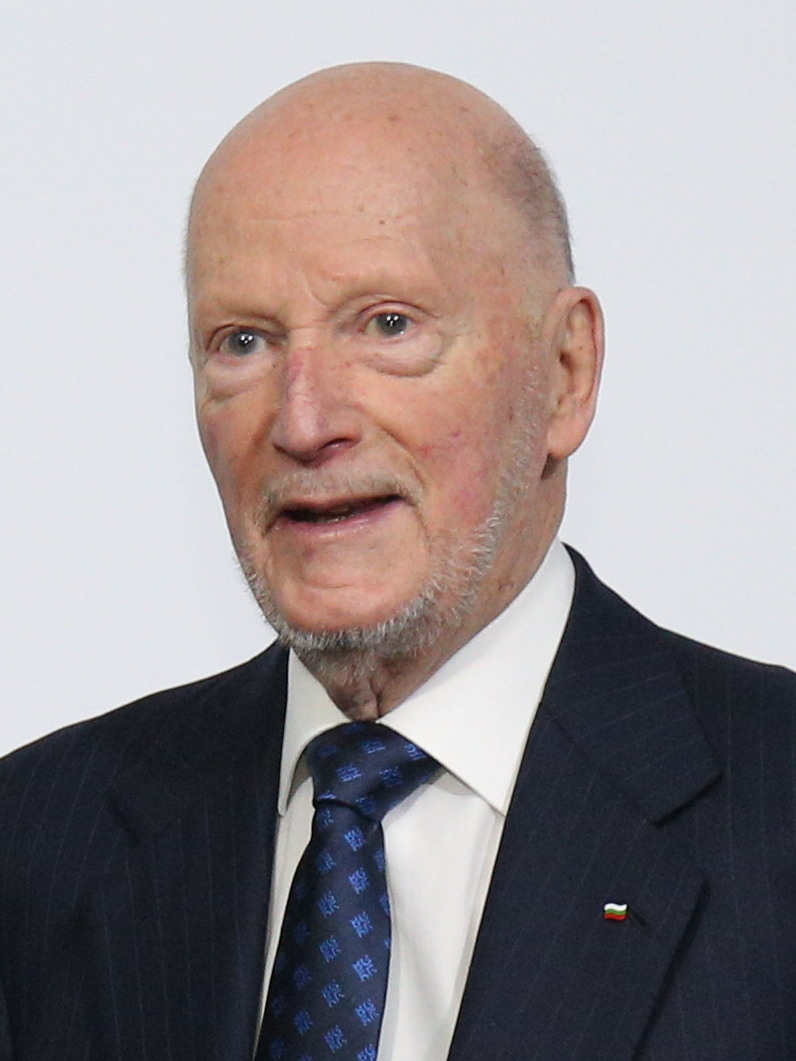
Vladimír Mečiar (left) and Simeon Saxe-Coburg-Gotha (right) led successful centrist populist parties in their respective countries.

Centrist populism has been usually more common in the Central and Eastern Europe. It is also sometimes referred to as new populism, new centrist populism, reformist populism, or managerial populism. The centrist populism term was largely built by the political scientists Peter Učeň and Pop-Eleches. In the Western world, the term new populism is, however, associated with far-right politics. Centrist populist parties emerged due to the dissillusionment with mainstream political parties.

According to the political scientist Ben Stanley, the most prominent and successful force of centrist populism during the 1990s was Vladimír Mečiar's Movement for a Democratic Slovakia (HZDS). Stanley wrote that HZDS's platform was vague and that their populism was unusual as it stemmed from "the founding elite of the Slovak Republic". The party later abandoned populism and disappeared from the political scene. Despite HZDS disappearing from the scene, two centrist populist parties emerged in Slovakia in the late 1990s and early 2000s, the Party of Civic Understanding (SOP) and Alliance of the New Citizen (ANO). SOP emerged from the political scene by criticising other political parties; after joining the government in 1998, they moderated their rhetoric. ANO, however, had a centre-right economic platform but also criticised elites in Slovakia. The party later shifted towards liberalism. Učeň also described Direction – Social Democracy (SMER) as a centrist populist political party that emerged in the early 2000s.

Centrist populism in Central and Eastern Europe became more prominent in the 2000s. Voters were dissatisfied with the post-communist transition, including alleged corruption. In Bulgaria, the National Movement for Stability and Progress (NDSV), led by Simeon Saxe-Coburg-Gotha, rose to power by attacking elites and their alleged corruption and incompetence. Once it entered the government, its populist rhetoric toned down. The GERB party replaced it as the leading centrist populist party in 2009. In the Baltics, the Estonian Res Publica Party (RP), Latvian New Era Party (JL), and Lithuanian Labour Party (DP) emerged in the early 2000s. RP struggled with its anti-establishment rhetoric once it joined the government; they eventually shifted towards a centre-right position. On the other hand, JL became popular due to criticising the privatisation of state companies and remained anti-establishment while in government. Despite this, JL had a neoliberal and conservative outlook. DP became the largest party in Lithuania in the 2004 parliamentary election after running on an anti-corruption and anti-elitist campaign.

In the aftermath of the 2008 financial crisis, several centrist populist parties saw an increase in popularity. In Romania, the People's Party – Dan Diaconescu rose in popularity by campaigning on an anti-elitist platform, criticising the established parties for poorly handling the financial crisis. In the Czech Republic, the Public Affairs gained prominence for promoting direct democracy and recall elections; they eventually joined the government but disappeared after the 2013 parliamentary election. In Slovakia, the Ordinary People and Independent Personalities (OĽaNO) became known for rallying against clientelism and elites, while in Hungary, Politics Can Be Different supported separation of powers to counter authoritarianism, while also campaigning on anti-elitist themes.

== Political parties ==
Pop-Eleches wrote that centrist populist parties served as vehicles for personal ambitions of politicians. Enyedi and Mölder wrote that leaders of centrist populist parties were usually charismatic, citing Boyko Borisov of GERB, Andrej Babiš of ANO 2011, Viktor Uspaskich of DP, and Mečiar of HZDS as examples. According to Smilov and Smilova, voters of centrist populist parties criticise aspects of liberal democracy, but are not economically impoverished. They are also usually not less educated than voters of other political parties.

Smilov and Smilova labelled the Bulgarian There Is Such a People (ITN) as a centrist populist party as it is personalistic, supports direct democracy, and rejects left- and right-wing political ideologies; they also added that not much is known about the party's political views. Additionally, they added that ITN cannot be considered a right-wing populist party, as it does not oppose the European Union, NATO, and democracy, while it is also not overtly xenophobic and homophobic. Regarding GERB and NDSV in Bulgaria, they also said that they started as centrist populist "of the Berlusconi type". NDSV later joined the Alliance of Liberals and Democrats for Europe Party and shifted towards liberalism, while GERB did not radicalise, but participated in governments with right-wing populist parties.

Regarding Slovakia, Učeň also labelled SMER and ANO as centrist populist, as they constantly criticised the elites and refused to elaborate their political views. Stanley also described SMER as a centrist populist party that took a leftward shift. In Croatia, the political scientists Marijana Grbeša and Berto Šalaj described The Bridge as a blend of moderate centrist populism and anti-establishment reformism, as they advocated for political reforms and anti-elitism. They also described the politician Ivan Grubišić as a centrist populist. In France, Emmanuel Macron has been identified as a centrist populist, while in the United States, David Nolan and Stephanie Brookes identified Governor Chris Christie as a centrist populist. The Slovenian government of Marjan Šarec has also been identified as centrist populist.

Before entering politics, Babiš, Borisov, and Matovič were entrepreneurs. Borisov started out his career as a high-profile member of NDSV, before founding GERB in 2006. Although GERB is a centre-right party, Borisov has also praised the accomplishments of Todor Zhivkov's communist government. In the Czech Republic, ANO 2011 has also been identified as technocratic populist; they were not ideologically-driven. After the 2021 Czech parliamentary election, however, ANO 2011 grew closer to Viktor Orbán's Fidesz but still considered themselves to be centrist. In Slovakia, OĽaNO presented itself as an anti-establishment and anti-corruption movement, but over the years it grown closer to conservatism. Babiš and Igor Matovič of OĽaNO argued that their political parties were movements instead.

Enyedi and Mölder described the Greek Political Spring and Portuguese National Solidarity Party as cases of "borderline" centrist populist parties. The Hungarian Fidesz and the Polish Law and Justice were formerly centrist populist but later shifted to right-wing populism. Smilov and Smilova argued that their positions radicalised and turned towards right-wing populism in the aftermath of the 2008 financial crisis. Fidesz started out as a liberal party and gradually transformed into a centrist populist party in the 2000s. Enyedi and Mölder classified Fidesz as centrist populist up until 2010.

The following list includes political parties that have been labelled as centrist populist:

- Austria: Freedom Party of Austria (1990, 1999–2002)
- Belgium: Vlaams Blok (1991)
- Bulgaria: GERB, National Movement for Stability and Progress (later became liberal), There Is Such a People, Bulgarian Business Bloc
- Croatia: Croatian Labourists – Labour Party, The Bridge
- Czech Republic: ANO 2011, Public Affairs
- Estonia: Res Publica Party, Estonian Centre Party
- France: Renaissance (formerly known as La République En Marche !)
- Greece: Political Spring
- Hungary: Fidesz (formerly, 2000–2006), LMP – Hungary's Green Party (formerly known as Politics Can Be Different), Tisza Party
- Iceland: Progressive Party (1995–2007)
- Italy: Forza Italia (2006–2010), Lega Nord (1996–2001, 2013)
- Japan: Democratic Party For the People
- Latvia: All for Latvia!, For Fatherland and Freedom/LNNK, Awakening (formerly known as For Latvia from the Heart), Popular Movement for Latvia, Democratic Party "Saimnieks", New Era Party, New Party, People's Party
- Lithuania: Labour Party, National Resurrection Party, Order and Justice, New Union (Social Liberals), Lithuanian Liberty Union
- Moldova: Braghiș Alliance
- Netherlands: Livable Netherlands
- Poland: Party X, Law and Justice (formerly)
- Portugal: National Solidarity Party
- Romania: New Generation Party, People's Party – Dan Diaconescu
- Slovakia: Alliance of the New Citizen, Direction – Social Democracy, Movement for a Democratic Slovakia, OĽaNO
- Slovenia: Slovenian National Party (1992–1996), New Slovenia
- Spain: Citizens
- Sweden: New Democracy
- Switzerland: Swiss People's Party (1991–1995)
- Ukraine: Servant of the People

== See also ==
- Median voter theorem
- Radical centrism

== Sources ==
=== Books ===
- Esther Herman, Lise; Muldoon, James, eds. (2019). Trumping the Mainstream: The Conquest of Democratic Politics by the Populist Radical Right. Routledge. ISBN 978-1-315-14499-3.
  - Enyedi, Zsolt; Mölder, Martin. "Populisms in Europe: Leftist, rightist, centrist and paternalist–nationalist challengers". In Esther Herman & Muldoon (2019), pp. 54–95.
- Huber, Robert A.; Jankowski, Michael (2025). Populism: An Introduction. Sage. ISBN 978-1-5296-6987-9.
- Mudde, Cas; Rovira, Cristóbal (2017). Populism: A Very Short Introduction. Oxford University Press. ISBN 978-0-19-023487-4.
- Smilov, Daniel; Smilova, Ruzha (2024). "Centrist and Radical Populism in Central and Eastern Europe". In Heinisch, Reinhard; Cekikj, Aneta; Koxha, Klaudia (eds.). Perspectives on Populism. Nomos. pp. 45–70. ISBN 978-3-7560-1200-8.
- Havlík, Vlastimil; Pinková, Aneta, eds. (2012). Populist Political Parties in East-Central Europe. Masaryk University. ISBN 978-80-210-7807-9.
  - Spáč, Peter. "Slovakia". In Havlík & Pinková (2012), pp. 227–258.
- Stanley, Ben (2017). "Populism in Central and Eastern Europe". In Rovira Kaltwasser, Cristóbal; Taggart, Paul; Espejo, Paulina Ochoa; Ostiguy, Pierre (eds.). The Oxford Handbook of Populism. Oxford University Press. pp. 140–160. ISBN 978-0-19-880356-0.
- Učeň, Peter (2004). "Centrist populism as a new competitive and mobilization strategy in Slovak politics". Party Government in Slovakia: Experience and Perspectives. pp. 45–73. ISBN 978-80-88935-64-3.
- Van Kessel, Stijn (2023). "Populism and Parties". In Carter, Neil; Keith, Daniel; Sindre, Gyda; Vasilopoulou, Sofia (eds.). The Routledge Handbook of Political Parties. Routledge. pp. 269–279. ISBN 978-0-429-55441-4.

=== Journal articles ===
- Bartul, Vuksan-Ćusa (1 March 2023). "Populist attitudes in Croatia: first analysis with notes on conceptualisation and measurement". Politics in Central Europe. 19 (1): 145–173. doi:10.2478/pce-2023-0007.
- Cossu, Elena (2024). "Application of Natural Language Processing to the electoral manifestos of parties characterised by populist rhetoric in Central and Eastern Europe". Intersections. 10 (4): 6–33. doi:10.17356/ieejsp.v10i4.1230.
- Drápalová, Eliška; Wegrich, Kai (October 2021). "Technocratic Populism and Subnational Governance". Government and Opposition. 56 (4): 640–660. doi:10.1017/gov.2020.16.
- Engler, Sarah; Bartek, Pytlas; Deegan-Krause, Kevin (2019). "Assessing the diversity of anti-establishment and populist politics in Central and Eastern Europe". West European Politics. 42 (6): 1310–1336. doi:10.1080/01402382.2019.1596696.
- Engler, Sarah (August 2020). "Centrist anti-establishment parties and their protest voters: more than a superficial romance?". European Political Science Review. 12 (3): 307–325. doi:10.1017/S1755773920000132.
- Grbeša, Marijana; Šalaj, Berto (26 March 2018). "Populism in Croatia: The Curious Case of The Bridge (Most)". Anali Hrvatskog politološkog društva: časopis za politologiju. 14 (1): 7–30. doi:10.20901/an.14.01.
- Hanley, Seán; Sikk, Allan (2016). "Economy, corruption or floating voters? Explaining the breakthroughs of anti-establishment reform parties in eastern Europe". Party Politics. 22 (4): 522–533. doi:10.1177/1354068814550438.
- Havlík, Vlastimil; Voda, Petr (June 2018). "Cleavages, Protest or Voting for Hope? The Rise of Centrist Populist Parties in the Czech Republic". Swiss Political Science Review. 24 (2): 161–186. doi:10.1111/spsr.12299.
- Larsen, Erik Gahner; Zulianello, Mattia (2021). "Populist parties in European Parliament elections: a new dataset on left, right and valence populism from 1979 to 2019". Electoral Studies. 71: 1–8. doi:10.1016/j.electstud.2021.102312.
- Michal, Aleš (4 December 2024). "Only Another Adjective, or Finally a New Functional Post-Ideological Subtype? A Conceptual Analysis of Valence Populism". Politics in Central Europe. 20 (4): 529–546. doi:10.2478/pce-2024-0023.
- Mudde, Cas (7 June 2021). "Populism in Europe: An Illiberal Democratic Response to Undemocratic Liberalism (The Government and Opposition/Leonard Schapiro Lecture 2019)". Government and Opposition. 56 (4): 577–597. doi:10.1017/gov.2021.15.
- Nolan, David; Brookes, Stephanie (2 October 2015). "The problems of populism: celebrity politics and citizenship". Communication Research and Practice. 1 (4): 349–361. doi:10.1080/22041451.2015.1108812.
- Perottino, Michel; Guasti, Petra (17 December 2020). "Technocratic Populism à la Française? The Roots and Mechanisms of Emmanuel Macron's Success". Politics and Governance. 8 (4): 545–555. doi:10.17645/pag.v8i4.3412.
- Petrović, Nikola; Raos, Višeslav; Fila, Filip (3 April 2023). "Centrist and Radical Right Populists in Central and Eastern Europe: Divergent Visions of History and the EU". Journal of Contemporary European Studies. 31 (2): 268–290. doi:10.1080/14782804.2022.2051000.
- Pop-Eleches, Grigore (2010). "Throwing out the bums: protest voting and unorthodox parties after communism". World Politics. 62 (6=2): 221–260. doi:10.1017/S0043887110000043.
- Saxonberg, Steven; Heinisch, Reinhard (15 March 2024). "Filling the Demand Gap: The Success of Centrist Entrepreneurial Populism in the Czech Republic". Europe-Asia Studies. 76 (3): 363–387. doi:10.1080/09668136.2022.2136624.
- Zulianello, Mattia (2023). "Populist Parties in Central and Eastern Europe: Regional Trends in Comparative Perspective". Poliarchie / Polyarchies. Edizioni Università di Trieste: 58–73. doi:10.13137/2611-2914/35183. hdl:10077/35183. ISSN 2611-2914.

=== Papers ===
- Hanley, Seán; Sikk, Allan (8–12 July 2012). "Paths to "Centrist Populism"? Explaining the Emergence of Anti-Establishment Reform Parties". International Political Science Association.
