= Techno-fascism =

Topics referred to by the same term

Techno-fascism or technofascism may refer to:

- Techno-populism, a combination of technocracy and populism that connects voters to leaders via expertise, sometimes termed techno-fascism when political rights are gained solely by technical expertise
- Techno-authoritarianism, the use of advanced technology, such as surveillance and data analysis, to maintain authoritarian control
- Techno-fascism (Japanese), a concept to describe the authoritarian rule executed by Japanese Reform bureaucrats during the 1930s and 1940s
- Technofascism (TechnoFascism or DigiFascism), an analytical framework concerning social domination in which digital technologies, artificial intelligence, algorithmic governance, data infrastructures, and platform power become closely intertwined with tech-oligarchic fascist tendencies first presented by A. G. Yushchenko in 2024 and formally recorded in scholarly literature.

== See also ==
- Technocracy
- Fascism
- Techno-capitalism
