= Centre Party =

Centre Party or Center Party may refer to:

== Active parties ==
- Åland Centre
- Centre Alliance
- Centre (Croatian political party)
- Estonian Centre Party
- Centre Party (Faroe Islands)
- Centre Party (Finland)
- Centre Party (Germany)
- Centre Party (Iceland)
- Centre Party of Ireland, formerly Renua
- Center Party (Iraq)
- Lithuanian Centre Party
- Centre Party (Nauru)
- Center Party (Norway)
- Centre Party (Norway)
- Centre Party (Poland)
- Centre Party (Sweden)
- Centre Party (Turkey)

== Historical parties ==
- Centre Party (Greenland)
- Centre Party (Israel)
- Centre Party (Jersey)
- Centre Party (Netherlands)
  - Centre Party '86
- Centre Party (New South Wales)
- Centre Party (Rhodesia)
- Centre Party (Sweden, 1924)
- Centre Party (Tasmania)
- Center Party (Thailand), now the Fair Party
- Commonwealth Centre Party
- National Centre Party (Ireland)
- Irish Centre Party (1919), political party in Ireland in 1919
- Centre Party (Hungary)

== See also ==
- Centrism
- Centrist Party
- Nordic agrarian parties
