= Centrist Party =

Centrist Party may refer to:

== Active parties ==
- Centrist Alliance, French political party
- Centrists for Europe, Italian political party
- Centrists for Sicily, Italian political party
- Centrist Democratic Party of the Philippines
- Centrist Democratic Party (Rwanda)
- The Centrists, French political party

== Historical parties ==
- Centrist Democrats, a defunct Austrian political party
- Centrists of Catalonia
- Union of the Centrist Center, a small political party in Chile from 1990 to 2002

== Factions, Caucuses and Movements ==
- Centrist camp, a Hong Kong's moderate political alignment
- Centrist Union group, a French Senate caucus
- New Democrats, also known as Centrist Democrats or Clinton Democrats
- Unite America, grassroots organization formerly known as The Centrist Project

== See also ==
- Centrism
- Centre Party
