= Valence issue =

Political issue with broad voter consensus

A valence issue is a political issue where there is a broad amount of consensus among voters. As valence issues are representative of a goal or quality, voters use valence issues to evaluate a political party’s effectiveness in producing this particular goal or quality.

The valence issue concept is a way of theorizing about how voters are motivated to vote for competing parties in an election. The concept was developed by Donald Stokes’s critique of voting behavior theories which Stokes foresaw as being too confined to ideas about a voter’s rationality and ideological impulses, as with spatial models of party competition. Since Stokes noticed during an overview of historical U.S. elections that voters sometimes were not bound by self-interest or ideology.

Valence issues can be contrasted and opposed to position issues, as position issues are organised by a voter’s ideology and their inclination for a selection of competing interests, rather than organised by the feelings of consensus found within valence issues. As valence issues can shape the outcome of an election and therefore a future government, voters and politicians both adjust their behavior according to valence issues.

== History of the concept ==
The valence issue concept originates from Donald Stokes’s critical review of Anthony Downs’s theory of voting behavior which analogues supply and demand market logic. Downs concluded that voters, when determining their voting preferences, and political parties, when determining which policies to supply, made economical and rational strategic choices within an ideological space.

Stokes’s main problem with Downs’s model of voting behavior was that empirical reality, specifically the most recent U.S elections in Stokes’s time, did not fit with Downs’s theoretical assumptions. Thus, Stokes's conceptualisation of valence issues emerged from his focused critique on one of Downs’s assumptions about voters making decisions on their vote based on a set of ordered alternative policy preferences. Stokes believed this way of imagining the voter may work with position issues but not valence issues, since valence issues were political issues that competing parties could not take an alternative position on, as parties ordinarily would with position issues.

In an election fought over position issues, an individual party can differentiate themselves from other competing parties by advocating different policy positions, so as to gain a greater amount of support from the voter than other rivaling parties and therefore win the election. For example, three competing parties may altogether each present to voters separate ideas about the degree of economic intervention, all with the aim to find and attract the most electoral support. However, valences issues offer minimal room for parties to form alternative stances on, as voters are all seemingly in agreement about a particular stance.

The valence issue of corruption highlights Stokes’s belief in voters having a broad consensus of preferences on certain issues. In an election where corruption becomes an important issue there would not be one party which was pro-corruption and a rivaling party which was anti-corruption. Instead, both parties would oppose corruption and it would be up to voters to decide which party would be best at bringing about an end to corruption. Therefore, valence issues are issues that are used by voters to evaluate a parties competence based on whether the party can most effectively bring about a goal or quality embodied by the valence issue, or, whether the party is to blame or should be credited with a past or present good or condition that is representative of the valence issue.

Since Stokes established the valence issue concept it has been applied to polities beyond the U.S. Whereas the original interpretation of the concept was founded on observations Stokes made when reviewing American elections in the thirties and forties; in which Stokes identified economic recovery as a valences issue, the US elections of 1952; where Stokes recognized the Korean war and corruption as two valence issues, and the 1956 and 1960 election; which Stokes’s sees as dominated by the valence issue of U.S foreign policy.

== Position issues ==
Position issues are an alternative to valence issues, as position issues create disagreement among voters because a broad consensus on the issue is lacking. Since position issues are divisive issues they consequently separate potential voters into distinct voting blocs that may support or oppose a way of dealing with the position issue at hand. Politicians and parties therefore have some maneuverability, policy wise they can arrange themselves more freely than when faced with a valence issue, as they can take a stance on a position issue according to a distinct voter bloc in order to collect voters who are mobilised by this politician's particular position issue perspective.

This description of position issues does not mean that valence issues are only about a consensus among voters, instead for positional issues it is also a question of whether the voter decided to support a party based on their ideological position. Accordingly, in a scenario where voters or parties have a weak or insufficiently pronounced ideological alignment valence issues are likely to dominate an election rather than position issues. Highlighting a comparison between valence issues and positional issues also does not mean that issues can only belong In those two categories, as both issue types may sometimes lurk behind one another or overlap, or, the issue at question may even transform from a position issue into a valance issue. Another way of thinking about the position issue versus valence issue dichotomy is to see voters as taking into account both position and valence issues when voting, as Egan has.

== Impact of valence issues on voters and politicians ==
=== Voters ===
When voters assess parties and politicians based on issue valence they learn about how parties and politicians relate to the issue in question over time. Therefore, it is hard for parties and politicians to change a voter’s long-standing perception about their own valence issue history. Furthermore, voters often equivocate parties with a single politician’s issue valence. However, when a parties valence issue history is not clear, for instance, when there is an election with a new or challenger party, then the voter is likely to make a decision based on position issues. A major crisis or political event is another way voters formulate lasting impressions about valence issues. In this instance the way a party addresses the crisis gives voters concerned with a valence issue that represents the crisis an idea of how competent parties are at handling this particular spotlighted valence issue. Other scholars have asserted that valence issues only matter to a specific kind of voter, these voters are non-ideological and only make their vote choices based on valence issues.

=== Parties and politicians ===
In an election purely focused on valence issues the candidate that is able to adopt the valence issue and demonstrate their competence at handling the issue wins. in such an election parties try to indicate to voters that they are better at realising a valence issue when compared to other parties via communicating their grasp of a valence issue during the election campaign. Yet unlike position issues politicians and parties have limited control over their command of a valence issue, especially when the valence issue concerns a politicians ascriptive characteristics. However, parties can try to overcome their poor reputation on a valence issue by steering the election campaign towards a battle over views on position issues and making a stance which is in line with the average voter’s attitude on that particular position issue. There are also other forms of electoral strategies concerning the interaction of valence issues and position issues beyond this specific example. For instance, some candidates may deliberately adopt a position issue that resembles the position issue of an opponent to accentuate their competence with a valence issue, thereby giving this candidate a valence issue advantage.

The valence issue reputation of a party is not static, as parties with competence on a particular valence issue can suffer once in power, since when these politicians in government there is a closer scrutiny of the governing party and there are opportunities for governing parties to make errors on valence issues. Additionally, once in government voters have an opportunity to reevaluate their ideas about a parties competence on valence issues based on real performance and therefore vote retrospectively.

== Examples of valence issues ==
In a study of campaigns for the US Senate, candidates focused upon valence issues in 77% of their advertising. In the United States, valence issues may include campaign finance reform, care of the elderly, crime, daycare, economy, education, inflation, and jobs. To contrast, position issues in the United States include abortion, civil rights, congressional pay, death penalty, drugs, foreign aid, the environment, gun control, healthcare, nuclear proliferation, school prayer, taxes, and term limits.

== See also ==
- Wedge issue
