= Reform bureaucrats =

Japanese WWII technofascist civilian faction

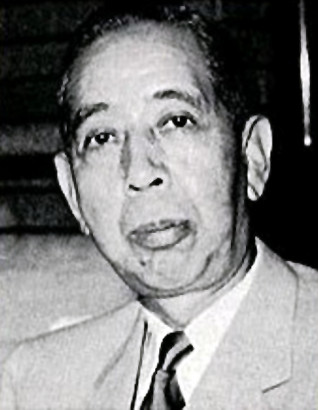
Nobusuke Kishi, one of the leaders of the reform bureaucrats

The reform bureaucrats (Japanese: 革新官僚, Hepburn: Kakushin Kanryō), also called revisionist bureaucrats or renovationist bureaucrats, were a group of Japanese civilian statesmen and planners during and after the Second World War, active in the states of the Empire of Japan and the puppet state of Manchukuo. The reform bureaucrats pushed for the establishment and strengthening of the Greater East Asia Co-Prosperity Sphere, as well as for the establishment of so-called "techno-fascism".

== Ideology and influences ==
Historian Janis Mimura refers to the ideology of the reform bureaucrats as techno-fascism, a technocratic authoritarian ideology based on "fusing private and public" and "separating capital and management", as well as a sense of Japanese superiority. During the war, the reform bureaucrats based their ideas of economic and political strength off of that of Nazi Germany, while after the war, they based them off of "peace and democracy". They wanted to create a managerial state (管理国家, orkanri kokka), where the state would control directly politics and the economy. Their economic goal was to form a managed economy (tōsei keizai) which would "eliminate the inequalities of laissez-faire capitalism and establish a total war system." The ideal system of the reform bureaucrats was that of "a fully mobilized and productive system run by creative, responsible citizens who ultimately would not require any kind of coercion from above."

The reform bureaucrats were pragmatic, and based their writings on multiple sources such as Marxist theory, Soviet planning, the New Deal in America, Nazi economic theory, and Japanese right-wing ideology. There were also different groups within the reform bureaucrats - Western economic theory-influenced reform bureaucrats such as Hideoto Mori [ja] and Kiwao Okumura [ja] were responsible for the basic framework for empire planning, while people such as Nobusuke Kishi and Etsusaburo Shiina were more focused on the implementation of this framework. The reform bureaucrats took from the writings of European economists Friedrich von Gottl-Ottilienfeld [de], Othmar Spann, Friedrich List, Hans Heinrich Lammers and Hans Pfundtner.

Students of German law at university within the reform bureaucrats were more statist, while those that studied English law were more progressive in their theory, and were influenced by Marxist theory. The Marxist-influenced reform bureaucrats rejected class conflict while accepting state planning and Marxist foundations. They believed that history was driven by technology and the Volk, and that the future would move towards a third way, associated with fascism. The bureaucrats saw the nation as the "primary unit of political loyalty", not class or individuals.

== Origins ==
In the late 1920s, a group of bureaucrats, mostly young members of the bureaucracy from the more technical ministries within the state and cabinet planning agencies that wanted to do away with the "night-watchman state" formed the clique of the reform bureaucrats. They thought that the increasing technicization of Japan would require the state and its bureaucracy to become more involved in general affairs. They called on their fellow bureaucrats to be more proactive - to perform "active management" rather than "passive supervision". Many of the reform bureaucrats were involved in the Ministry of Commerce and Industry, which was responsible for Japan's mobilization, and the Cabinet Planning Board [ja]. The former produced bureaucrats such as Nobusuke Kishi while the latter had people such as Naoki Hoshino. Many were also alumni of Tokyo Imperial University, having studied there in the 1920s and established ties with each other, most of them studying either German or English law at the law school.

== Activities in Manchuria ==
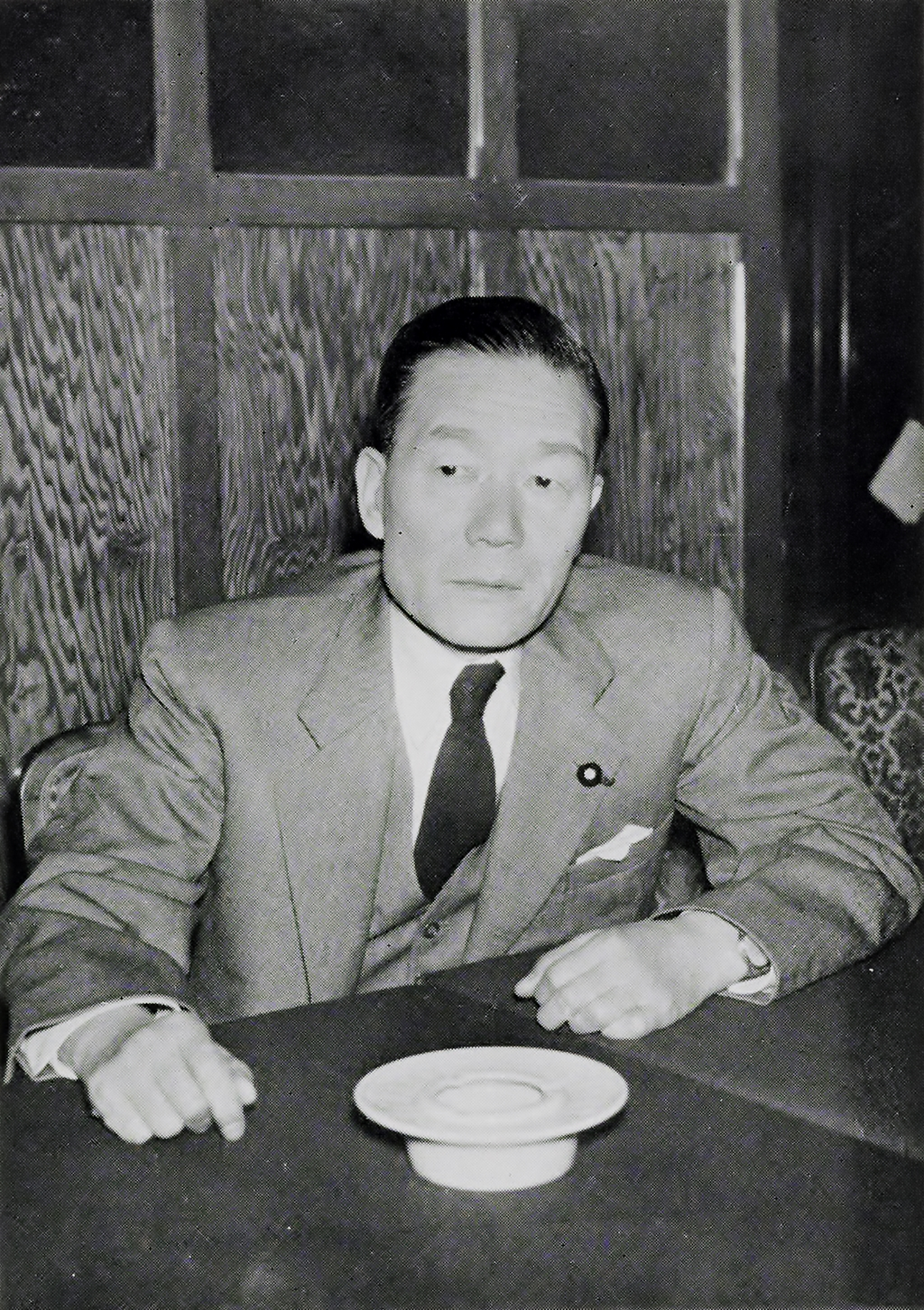
Etsusaburo Shiina, one of the reform bureaucrats

Following the 1931 Japanese invasion of Manchuria, the Japanese Kwantung Army experimented with state-building in the new puppet state of Manchukuo. Within a year of the invasion, bureaucratic forces were introduced to Manchuria - army leaders Shigeru Honjo and Kanji Ishiwara were recalled to Japan, being replaced with the more low-key Nobuyoshi Muto and Kuniaki Koiso, who began to invite bureaucrats to Manchuria - in July 1932, Naoki Hoshino was invited to advise the Finance Department of Manchukuo, who then invited Tadayuki Furumi [ja], Reisuke Matsuda, and Hideoto Mori [ja], all of which would play important roles in Manchukuo. In 1933, Etsusaburo Shiina and Yoji Minobe [ja] were transferred to Manchuria, where Shiina served in the Industrial Department and Minobe served in the Patent Bureau. In October 1936, Nobusuke Kishi followed suit, becoming the deputy director of the Industrial Department.

The bureaucrats who arrived in Manchuria saw it as a way to showcase administrative ability to the West. They wanted efficient bureaucratic administration and industrial wealth. Shiina believed, in regards to peace in the region, that "there is a 7:3 ratio of military might to government. Without a 7:3 ratio of government to military might it cannot be achieved. To the extent possible, win the hearts of the people through the power of government; if this fails, then bring out military force." The balance of power between the Kwantung Army and the bureaucrats was made so that the bureaucrats could control the state and the foundations of industry while the military would rule through internal guidance over bureaucratic activities.

The bureaucrats were, in Manchuria, challenged with providing the foundations for industry. Shiina created the Temporary Industrial Research Bureau in October 1934, which was tasked with researching hydropower, industry, agriculture, and infrastructure, as well as the legal framework for economic planning. Hoshino created the Continental Science Board, which focused on scientific and technological research. Kishi, having had the Chief of Staff, Seishiro Itagaki, agree that he would have complete freedom in the industrial economy, created an ambitious industrialization plan that included dams, power-line construction, land-reclamation, the setting up of an aluminium industry, and mining. Kishi invited Nissan's leader Gisuke Ayukawa to Manchuria to oversee these projects.

In preparation for a war with the Soviet Union, Ishiwara, along with radical officers and reform bureaucrats, tried to transform Manchukuo into a war economy based on heavy and chemical industries. In 1936, reform bureaucrats in Manchukuo's Industrial Department created a Five-Year Industrial Plan.

== Wartime efforts ==
Following the beginning of the Second Sino-Japanese War, the Five-Year Industrial Plan became the framework for Japan's wartime economy. Alongside Fumimaro Konoe, the Prime Minister of Japan, the reform bureaucrats launched the New Order movement, creating institutions and laws that were focused on making the population focus on "constructing East Asia" (tōa kensetsu), encouraging cooperation between classes, and increase efficiency and productivity. At this time, the reform bureaucrats also allied themselves with Japanese state engineers, who developed the notion of "comprehensive technology" (sōgō gijutsu).

In October 1937, the Cabinet Planning Board [ja] was formed by Konoe. This organization was used as a vehicle by the reform bureaucrats to design a corporatist managed economy - it was the total war mobilization of Japan's "economic general staff". The Board helped in drafting laws such as the Materials Mobilization Plan and the National Total War Mobilization Law, the former of which allocated resources to the military, ministries, and the private sector, and the latter of which giving the Board powers to impose price controls, form cartels, draft labor, monitor labor conditions, and control financing.

Following the formation of the Cabinet Planning Board, reform bureaucrats in China drew up plans for a similar organization - the Asia Development Board, which was established in December 1938 with support from the Imperial Japanese Army. The board was responsible for economic development plans, the North China Development Company and Central China Development Company, economic controls, financial and currency policy, transportation and communications networks, and cultural activities. A Technology Department under Takenosuke Miyamoto [ja] was created within the Board, aimed towards coordinating technical matters for it.

Under Konoe's second cabinet, formed in July 1940, the reform bureaucrats became more aggressive in their actions. During this time, many bureaucrats were appointed to the Cabinet Planning Board, where they helped in the development of Konoe's New Order. However, the reform bureaucrats saw considerable pushback from the business community, ministries, and the Diet, which were against the bureaucrats' aims of expanding the Board's powers and wartime mobilization laws. In October 1940, the reform bureaucrats in the Cabinet Planning Board began to draft policy for the realization of the "Outline for Japan-Manchukuo-China Economic Construction", which would "comprehensively unite" the politics, culture, and economics of the three countries. Japan, the center of this "organic self-sufficient sphere", would focus on "expanding national power by mobilizing the people and reorganizing the economy to guide and manage the construction of Manchukuo and China".

The reform bureaucrats were influential in the forming of Hideki Tojo's Greater East Asia Co-Prosperity Sphere. His speech in January 1942 to the Diet regarding the Co-Prosperity Sphere was taken directly from Mori's draft on "constructing the Greater East Asia Co-Prosperity Sphere" for the Cabinet Planning Board.

In 1943, Mori and many other reform bureaucrats centralized the Cabinet Planning Board and the Ministry of Commerce and Industry into the Ministry of Munitions.

== List of reform bureaucrats ==
- Akira Muto (Imperial Japanese Army)
- Gessan Akinaga [ja] (Imperial Japanese Army)
- Hideo Iwakuro (Military Affairs Bureau)
- Nobusuke Kishi (Ministry of Commerce and Industry)
- Etsusaburo Shiina (Ministry of Commerce and Industry)
- Yoji Minobe [ja] (Ministry of Commerce and Industry)
- Tsuneji Taniguchi [ja] (Ministry of Finance)
- Hisatsune Sakomizu (Ministry of Finance)
- Hideoto Mori (Ministry of Finance)
- Naoki Hoshino (Ministry of Finance)
- Seishi Shigemasa (Ministry of Agriculture and Forestry)
- Hyotaro Kashiwabara (Ministry of Railways)
- Kiwao Okumura [ja] (Ministry of Communications)
