= Margaret Canovan =

English political theorist (1939–2018)

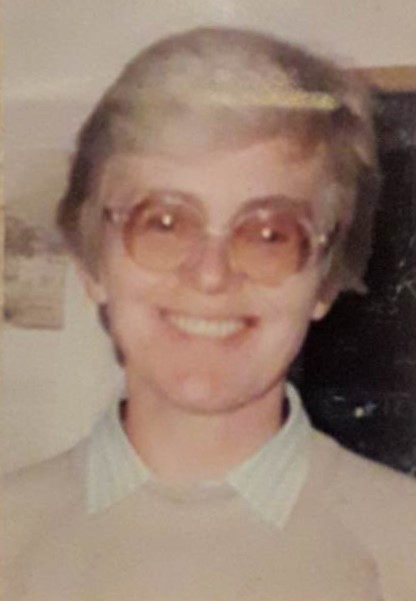
- Born: 1939; Carlisle, England
- Died: 18 June 2018 (aged 79); Kirkcudbright, Scotland
- Spouse: James Canovan (m. 1971)
- Children: 1

Academic background
- Education: Girton College (University of Cambridge)

Academic work
- Institutions: Lancaster University (1964–1971); Keele University (1974–2002)
- Main interests: Nationalism; totalitarianism; populism

Margaret Canovan (1939–2018) was an English author and political theorist.

Born in Carlisle in 1939, Canovan studied history at Girton College, Cambridge, where she completed a PhD on 18th Century scientist and philosopher Joseph Priestley. She became a professor in the Politics Department at Lancaster University not long after its inception, later moving to Keele University where she remained until her retirement in 2002.

Canovan published several books but is perhaps best known for her work on historian and political theorist Hannah Arendt, particularly after accessing Arendt's unpublished papers in the late 1980s. Her book Hannah Arendt: A Reinterpretation of Her Political Thought (1992) was described by Gordon Tolle in The Review of Politics as "an excellent and comprehensive explanation of how Arendt's political theory emerges out of her early struggle to understand the new phenomenon of totalitarianism".

Her later work on nationalism was also received with international acclaim. Steven Engel noted that "Canovan's book distinguishes itself in that its aim is 'to argue that questions of nationhood are not an optional extra for political theory, but should actually be at the heart of the discipline' ". Bernard Yack credits Canovan with arguing that "national loyalties help liberals establish a sense of intergenerational continuity" that is difficult to establish via mere civic membership, and that this intergenerational "bond" is essential in maintaining "continuity and stability" in a democratic polity. She published at least four essays on populism, and was regarded as a "true pioneer" in its study.

== Selected works ==
Canovan's books include:

- The Political Thought of Hannah Arendt (1974)
- G. K. Chesterton (1978)
- Populism (1981)
- Hannah Arendt: A Reinterpretation of Her Political Thought (1992)
- Nationhood and Political Theory (1996)
- The People (2005)
