= Techno-populism =

Political ideology

Techno-populism is either a populism in favor of technocracy or a populism concerning certain technology – usually information technology – or any populist ideology conversed using digital media. It can be employed by single politicians or whole political movements respectively. Neighboring terms used in a similar way are technocratic populism, technological populism, and cyber-populism. Italy's Five Star Movement and France's La République En Marche! have been described as technopopulist political movements.

== Etymology ==
The term techno-populism is either a portmanteau of technology and populism to derive a new combined meaning, or a portmanteau using technocracy and populism. It has been noted that broad definitions of techno-populism do not account for regional variants of techno-populism, with the result that "the empirical work on populism is almost invariably confined to specific countries or world regions. This is partly inevitable given the costs and difficulty of cross-national and cross-regional comparisons and often treats the specification of national and regional manifestations of populism as unspecific. This means that populism literature is not as cumulative as it should be, and it is prone to exception fallacy". Technopopulism or technological populism might also have the meaning of application of modern digital technologies for populist means. The latest meaning is similar to cyber-populism.

The commonly held definition of technology is "the application of scientific knowledge for practical purposes, especially in industry", while the definition of populism that is held by most academics is "a political approach that strives to appeal to ordinary people who feel that their concerns are disregarded by established elite groups". In relation to these two definitions, techno-populism has been described as a "political ideology that appeals to a group of people whom are concerned about their lack of power and interaction with their nations political and economic discourse that is presented through technological knowledge. Techno-populism can be defined as a singular, confusing ideology with various uses in academia, with some academics rejecting the term, and others using it to analyze the growth of populist speech online.

According to De Blasio and Sorice, technopopulism can be defined as the belief that 'government of the people, by the people, for the people' is achievable by means of information communications technology, in a sort of digital update of Lincoln’s formula. The authors identify technopopulism as one of the four main types of populism observable in the contemporary political context, along with neo-liberal, social and national populism. The distinctive characteristics of technopopulism are:

- Horizontal egalitarianism promised through Internet and digital platforms (e.g., Rousseau platform of M5S);
- Direct democracy presented as the ultimate goal, realised via online voting and disintermediation;
- Technolibertarian emphasis on efficiency, privatisation, meritocracy, “newism” (the new is always better), short-termism, and managerialism, and anti-bureaucratic rhetoric;
- Hyper-representation exercised through platforms and technical expertise rather than traditional parties or leaders (the platform/algorithm “represents” the will of the people);
- Strong anti-political and anti-elite rhetoric that portrays traditional politics and institutions as inefficient, corrupt, and obsolete;
- Technology as ideological framework and “storyline” (not just a tool), producing a convergence or “strange meeting” between the populist myth of direct democracy and the technocratic myth of the “one best way”;
- Rhetorical (and sometimes real) opposition to “European technocracy” while paradoxically sharing its anti-pluralist traits with technocracy itself: both claim there is only one authentic will of the people (populism) or only one correct technical solution (technocracy), so traditional debate and mediation are unnecessary.

=== Technocratic populism ===
Technocratic populism is a combination of technocracy and populism that connects voters to leaders via expertise, and is output-oriented. Technocratic populism offers solutions beyond the right-left division of politics, which are introduced by technocrats and benefit the ordinary people. Examples of politicians in Western Europe who deployed technocratic populism are Giuseppe Conte and Emmanuel Macron, while Ciudadanos, Corbynism, Podemos, and M5S are examples for analogous political movements. Techno-populism in the sense of technocratic populism is sometimes termed techno-fascism, where political rights are only gained by technical expertise. Techno-fascism is also a historical concept introduced by Janis Mimura to describe an authoritarian rule executed by technocrats in Manchukuo and the Empire of Japan. More recently, the terms "techno-fascism", "techno-accelerationism", and "technofeudalism" have been used in political commentary to describe the fusion of state and corporate tech power in the United States under the second Trump administration, particularly concerning the influence of Silicon Valley executives like Elon Musk. Chayka draws upon Mimura's analysis of unaccountable Japanese bureaucratic ministries to characterize initiatives like the Department of Government Efficiency as a techno-fascist merging of corporate and state power. This ideology is identified as "Muskian techno-accelerationism," distinguishing it from traditional Marxist accelerationism; instead of inspiring collapse and a proletarian revolution, it aims to destroy the existing government to impose a hierarchical order with engineers at the top. The term "technofeudalism" has been used by right-wing figures such as Steve Bannon to criticize Silicon Valley's ideology as antihuman, viewing it as an effort to turn citizens into "digital serfs" constrained by tech monopolies. The dominant aesthetic of this new alignment is often characterized by the use of Generative AI.

=== Technological populism ===
Technological populism is diagnosed in the case of blockchain platforms, which use the narrative of empowering ordinary people through decentralized decision-making process, facilitating anonymity of transactions, enabling trust without third parties and combating the monopoly of the financial system regarding money supply. Technological populism does not separate politics and technology, denies confidence in experts and moves technological decision making into public domain. According to Marco Deseriis, techno-populism in the sense of technological populism is the belief that popular self-government is achievable by means of digital media:

Technopopulism is the belief that the "government of the people, by the people, for the people" (Lincoln 1953 [1863]) is achievable by means of information communications technology. ... Technopopulism can also be understood in Foucauldian terms as an emerging discourse (Foucault 1972), that is, as a body of knowledge, norms, attitudes, and practices that arise from the hybridization of two preexisting discourses: populism and technolibertarianism. Even though these discursive practices are historically separate, I contend that they have begun to converge after the 2008 financial crisis as widespread frustration at the ruling elites' mishandling of the crisis sparked international protest movements, and propelled a new generation of "technoparties" such as the Five Star Movement in Italy, Podemos in Spain, and the Pirate Party in Iceland.

Some sources use the word cyber-populism as synonym for technological populism concerning with application of information technology for government and even identify two varieties of it: techno-plebiscitarianism as seen in the tendency to upset the principle of pluralism", and techno-proceduralism as seen in the obsession with methods and the comparative neglect of substantive demands beyond the mere demand of democracy 2.0.

== History ==
The combination of populism and technology to form techno-populism is a recent phenomenon to world economics and politics and has seen its developments from the end of the 20th century up to recent years. According to Daniele Caramani, "populism has been present in political processes since Plato's conception of politics and the Roman republic to the modern era. Even with the development of representative democracy and party governments after the National and Industrial Revolutions of the 19th century, populism and technocracy have continued to work in alignment with these ideals also".

With the advent of the internet and its common use in the 21st century, techno-populist movements have been particularly been enabled to the spread of social media as independent coverage of populist movements can be shared quickly and seen by millions. This has presented an ability for populist politics to access audience through the mass networking capabilities of social media which was previously unattainable before the digital age. Communication and digital media provided by advances in technologies has also given new opportunities for political inclusion for citizens in participating in democratic processes and ultimately the creation of a new public sphere centered on discursive and participatory practices.

Both populism and democracy are today widespread in different parts of the world, but due to developments in technology such as the Internet populist movements have all simultaneously developed some presence over communication on the internet despite differing issues in regional contexts. Techno-populism is growing among all regions in the world, but that it has as much to do with the adoption of the internet over the past two decades as it does in the spread of populist ideologies. Daniele Caramani argues that "Techno-Populist mobilization is not restricted to regional areas but can be promoted on certain topics, which either intentionally or unintentionally are not being addressed by the establishment".

== Technocratic and technological populisms by region ==
=== North America ===
In the United States, techno-populism has seen development in the past decade due to a backlash against the neoconservatism and corporatist values presented by a large amount of political parties despite radical changes in economic and social issues. In particular, the 2008 financial crisis led to a growth of resentment against the 1% by the 99%. In response to the Great Recession, movements were formed to bring awareness to the growing economic issues and the Occupy movement and the Tea Party movement were both techno-populist movements that were protested for change. The populist approach of the Occupy movement made regular reference to its "people" being what it called "the 99%" while they challenged the economic and political "elites of Wall Street".

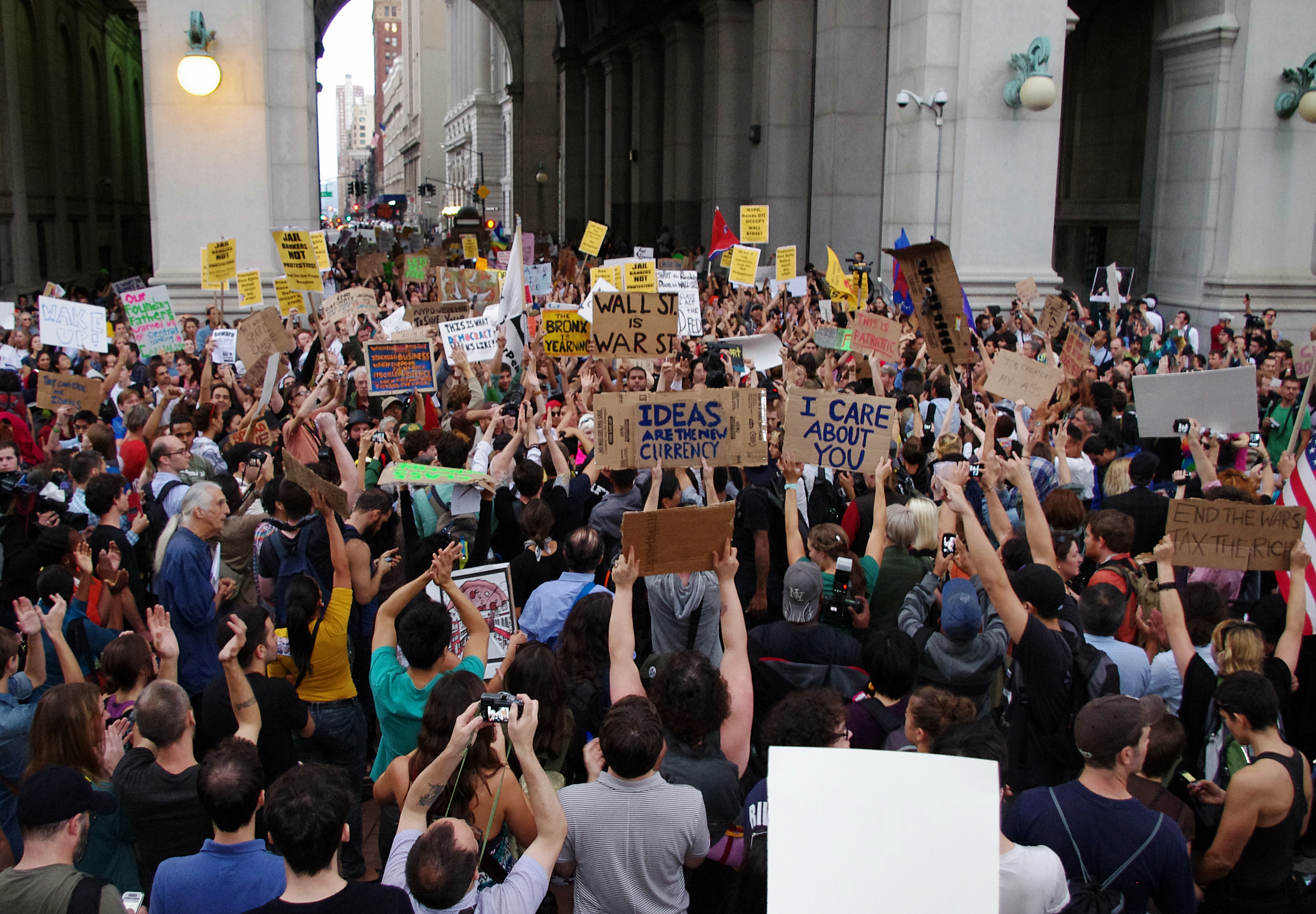
Day 14 Occupy Wall Street, 30 September 2011, Shankbone 47

In Canada, only the Reform Party qualifies as a populist party whose initial and sustaining appeal was to "the people" as against "the elite". That the identities of both the people and the elite in Reform Party discourse were strikingly at odds with those understood in much of North American populist history and appeal has been vital to the Reform Party distinctive role in Canadian politics. As it was dissolved in 2000, it did not use aspects of digital communication to further its political movement. A recent example of a techno-populist movement that has arisen over backlash from videos and reports spread on social media is the yellow vest protests in Canada. Various aspects of populist movements have continued to be present in both Canada's government and social movements in the past decade and the role of technology in connecting people to these causes has had a role in developing this trend.

=== Europe ===
In Europe, techno-populism is a movement of networked individuals which pursues and enacts citizens of a nation to play a critical role in conferring unity to a leading technocratic and leaderless political organisation". Techno-populist movements have had a presence in European politics since the advent of the internet, but they have also existed prior to the internet under different names and methods to campaign to the public. The latest generation of techno-populist parties in Europe include the left-wing backlashes to corruption and the growing economic elite class from the Five Star Movement in Italy, Podemos in Spain and the Pirate Party in Iceland. Whilst there has also been a growth in right-wing euroskeptic parties across Europe from the Alternative for Germany in Germany to the National Rally in France and Italy's National Alliance which have gained parliamentary seats in both their own countries as well as in the European Parliament. Through the spread of advocacy groups and campaigns on social media, techno-populist parties have been able to rally followers and spread their message to the public. In late 2018 to early 2019, the yellow vest movement challenged Emmanuel Macron in France regarding raising the cost of gas. According to Adam Nossiter, "[u]nlike other nationalistic movements the yellow vest movement sought to resolve the inequalities about economic class and the inability for working class Frenchmen to pay their bills who need their cars". The yellow vest movement was unique as a techno-populist movement in its advocacy for class equality whilst other parties across Europe have focused on presenting "the people" on their nationalistic identity, but they still utilized the common trend of spreading viral videos of their movement to promote their cause.

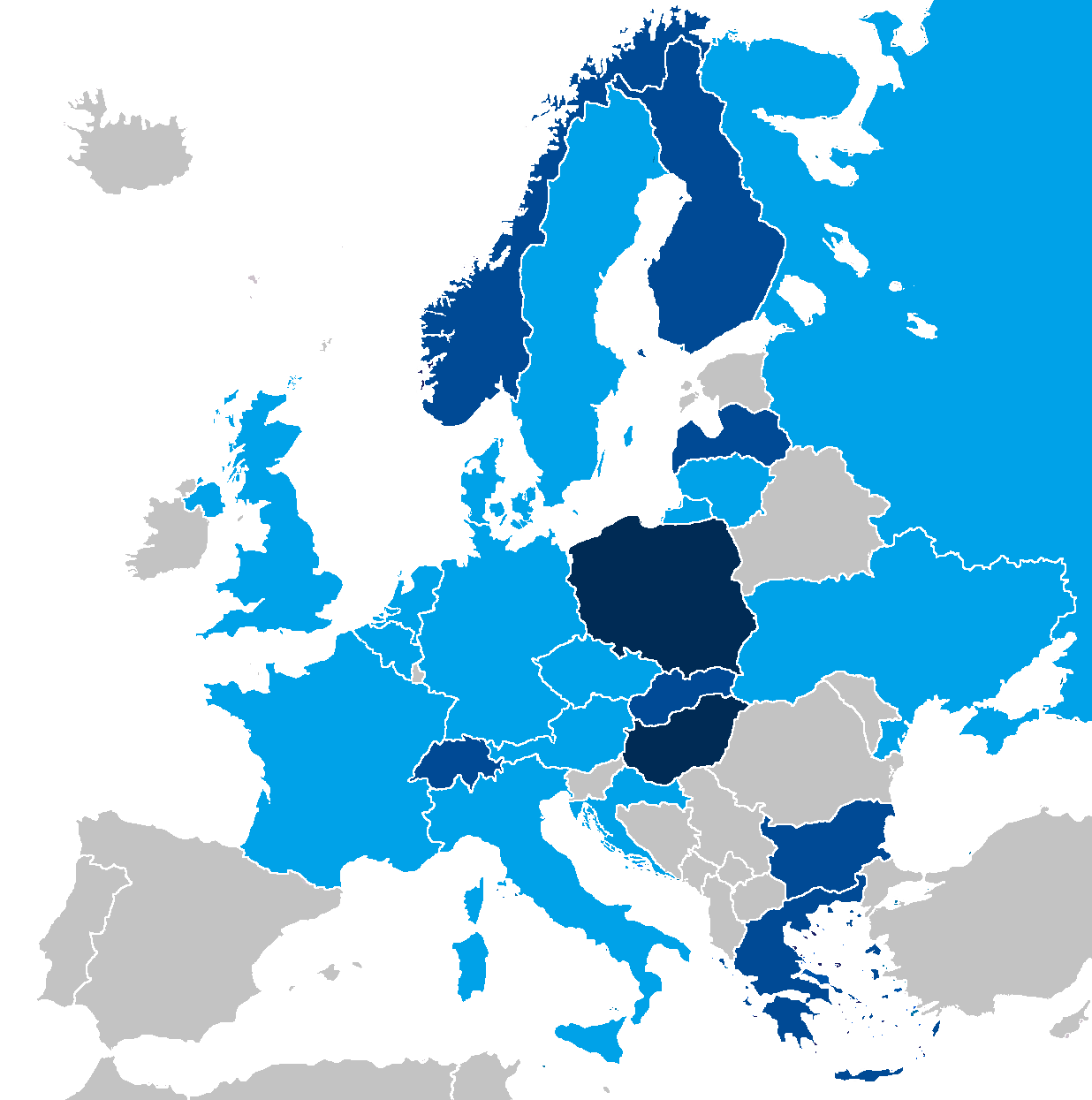
Right-wing populist parties in European national parliaments (October 2017)

Presently in Central Europe, the Italian National Alliance and Northern League have held various parliamentary seats by using techno-populist rhetoric to further connect with voters. Unlike other regions, the large amount of populist political parties in Europe share a Euroskeptic manifesto. It has been argued that "these right-wing populist parties have rallied behind the Austrian government to protest the perceived illegitimate and hypocritical EU interference regarding the formation of a government that included a populist radical party in Austria" whilst they state that Silvio Berlusconi forming a coalition with Gianfranco Fini National Alliance and Umberto Bossi's Northern League was a similar formation of government that went unpunished by the European Union. It is due to this that Mudd has conferred that when "supranational institutions try to take sanctions based on democratic principles, they are not capable of overcoming national power asymmetries without granting more legitimacy to the populist forces".

Whilst in Southern Europe, the techno-populist Five Star Movement (M5S) in Italy has demonstrated its populist appeal by getting nearly "25 percent of the overall vote". Similar to other populist parties, they rallied behind mobilizing "the people" to oppose what they saw as a "corrupt political class that did not put the will of the people ahead of their own self interests". Italy's former Prime Minister, Giuseppe Conte, who led the country from 2018 to 2021 and later became M5S leader, has been often labeled as a techno-populist.

=== Asia ===
Across Asia, the two main political systems consist of democracies and authoritarian states. As central Asia and East Asia have maintained constant political order through providing autocratic or economic leadership in their countries, south eastern Asia has seen the greatest growth of populist and techno-populist mobilization. It has been argued that "[w]hen the richer classes are looking for leadership change, they often support strongmen, such as military rulers, dedicated to preserving inequality and established elites. When autocratic-leaning populists win elections in Southeast Asia, the upper and upper-middle classes have often fought back by ousting populists via coups or de facto coups, in countries such as Thailand and the Philippines". In the Middle East, the Arab Spring of 2011 was a movement that was techno-populist in its spread of political awareness, but it was not a populist movement more than it was a rebellion against authoritarian states.

=== Africa ===
Populist movements in Africa have primarily revolved around the abilities of African governments in solving crises of electricity and water, garbage collection, housing availability and affordable food. Since the early 2000s, Zambia's political scene has been transformed by an opposition party known as the Patriotic Front led by Michael Sata. Populist parties have also been present in presidential elections in Kenya, South Africa and Zambia by using the discontent of poor urban and rural populations to influence elections, but their use of digital media to expand their appeal is less pronounced than in other regions.

== Cyber-populism by region ==
=== North America ===
Techno-populism was present in the Tea Party movement that focused on primarily on producerism as a methodology in opposing "the elite". This movement was partisan against the Democratic administration of President Barack Obama.^{[201]} It was considered a techno-populist movement because it was organised by "the people" with little political experience and the movement used social media to lower the costs associated with acquiring new political skills. The use of social media also created a democratic forum where individuals could discuss political ideas outside of party politics and also identify their active supporters. In political movements, increased communication and discourse can also be the downfall of techno-populist movements similar to how "Individuals who left the Florida Tea Party Movement (FTPM) attributed social media for their exit despite all of the respondents initially were excited by the open, network structure of social media because it maximized interaction among FTPM enthusiasts". During the second Trump administration, techno-fascism became mainstreamed amid intensified efforts to delegitimize democratic institutions while leveraging digital tools to dismantle and replace government agencies and personnel, suppress dissent, consolidate control, and erode public trust in independent media and electoral processes. This evolution is marked by the fusion of authoritarian political power with advanced surveillance technologies, platform manipulation, and state-aligned disinformation campaigns.

=== Europe ===
Whilst also embodying the technocracy, the Five Star Movement sought to represent the views of the people through an online voting and debate portal for a direct style of democracy on the internet. In 2018, the Five Star Movement maintained seats in parliament and across the frontbench, but through mainly aligning themselves with a coalition of Matteo Salvini's League, another techno-populist party that appeals to Italian voters are discontent from increased immigration with Salvini's surging Italy-first agenda popularity online. Some critics have since stated that "the setbacks afflicting the M5S show the problems facing unconventional, populist parties that are sprouting up across Europe in evolving from raucous protest movements into mature rulers".

=== South America ===
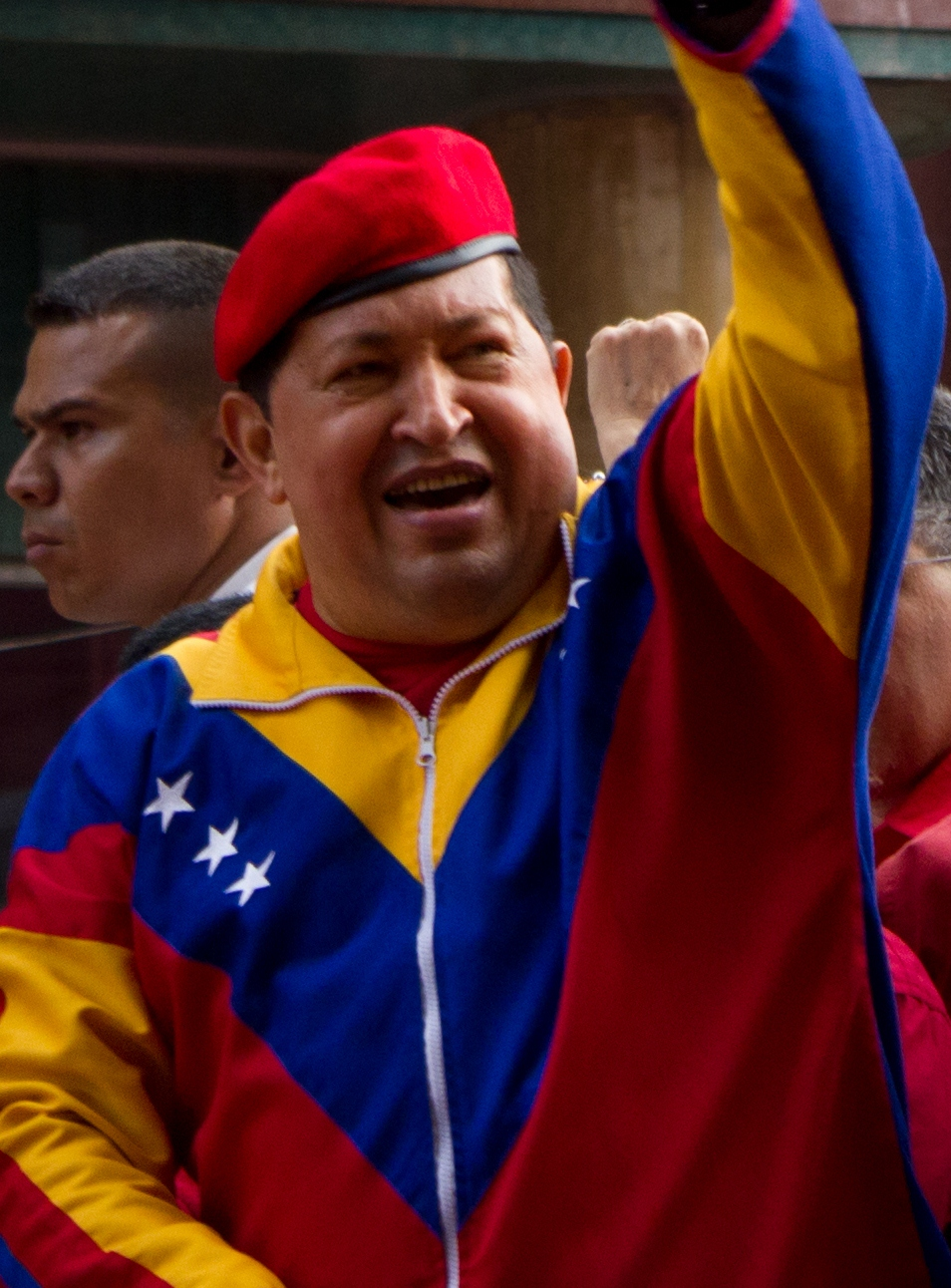
Hugo Chávez

Recent political cycles in South America have seen political outsiders leverage populism and anti-systemic appeal to approve policy programs and regime changes. Regional insurgences of techno-populism in Latin America do not have a single political identity and occur on both the left and right of politics. Many leaders of these movements have been able to echo their political views online through appealing to techno-populism to then yield great variation and political uncertainty in levels of democratic processes. The advent of the Internet and social media has raised the voices of populist causes across the region presently including party systems in Bolivia, Ecuador and Venezuela. Prominent examples of techno-populist leaders included Hugo Chávez in Venezuela, Rafael Correa in Ecuador, Evo Morales in Bolivia, and Daniel Ortega in Nicaragua.

A techno-populist movement in South American politics includes the past Venezuelan president Hugo Chávez and his United Socialist Party of Venezuela. His policies have a populist message through proposing to redistribute the wealth of Venezuelan to reward allies in other countries in the region such as Bolivian and Ecuador to undermine American influence in Latin America. Through his references to the "people and calling his political opponents "lackeys of imperialism", Chavez demonstrates some of his populist ideology. It was through his use of the Internet to further his image among the citizens of Venezuela in 2006 that has led to Kirk A. Hawkins to propose that Chávez was a populist leader with technocratic tendencies. Latin American left-wing populism is described by an endeavor to reclassify democracy through advancing positions that are progressively important for "the people" as opposed to different individuals from society. Contemporary populism is not just changing the importance of the very idea of democracy in Latin America, but rather it is starting an open and scholastic discussion on the weaknesses of the neoliberal of the United States and their political impact on Latin America in the most recent decades. It has been argued that "[t]he long-term persistence of state pathologies under democratic rule is likely to have corrosive effect on public confidence in basic state institutions in many countries. However it has been argued that Latin American countries with a strong party system and solid political institutions can avoid populist reactions, since in these cases the proper functioning of the institutions of democratic representation leave little space for the (re)emergence of populism".

=== Oceania ===
In Australia, a two-party system is still preferred, but since the 2008 financial crisis there has been a growing amount of minor parties gaining representation in the two parliamentary houses. According to Hogan Warre, "[t]he most common rhetoric that is used in Australia is that the economic and political elites benefit at the expense of the public". Some techno-populist parties have used online mediums to target their voters including Pauline Hanson's One Nation and the United Australia Party which in the 2016 federal election gained parliamentary representation in the Australian Senate. In New Zealand, "past Prime Minister Robert Muldoon from 1975 to 1984, had been cited as a populist leader who appealed to the common man and utilized a personality-driven campaign in the 1975 election".

== See also ==
- Populism
- Technocracy movement
