= Cas Mudde =

Dutch political scientist (born 1967)

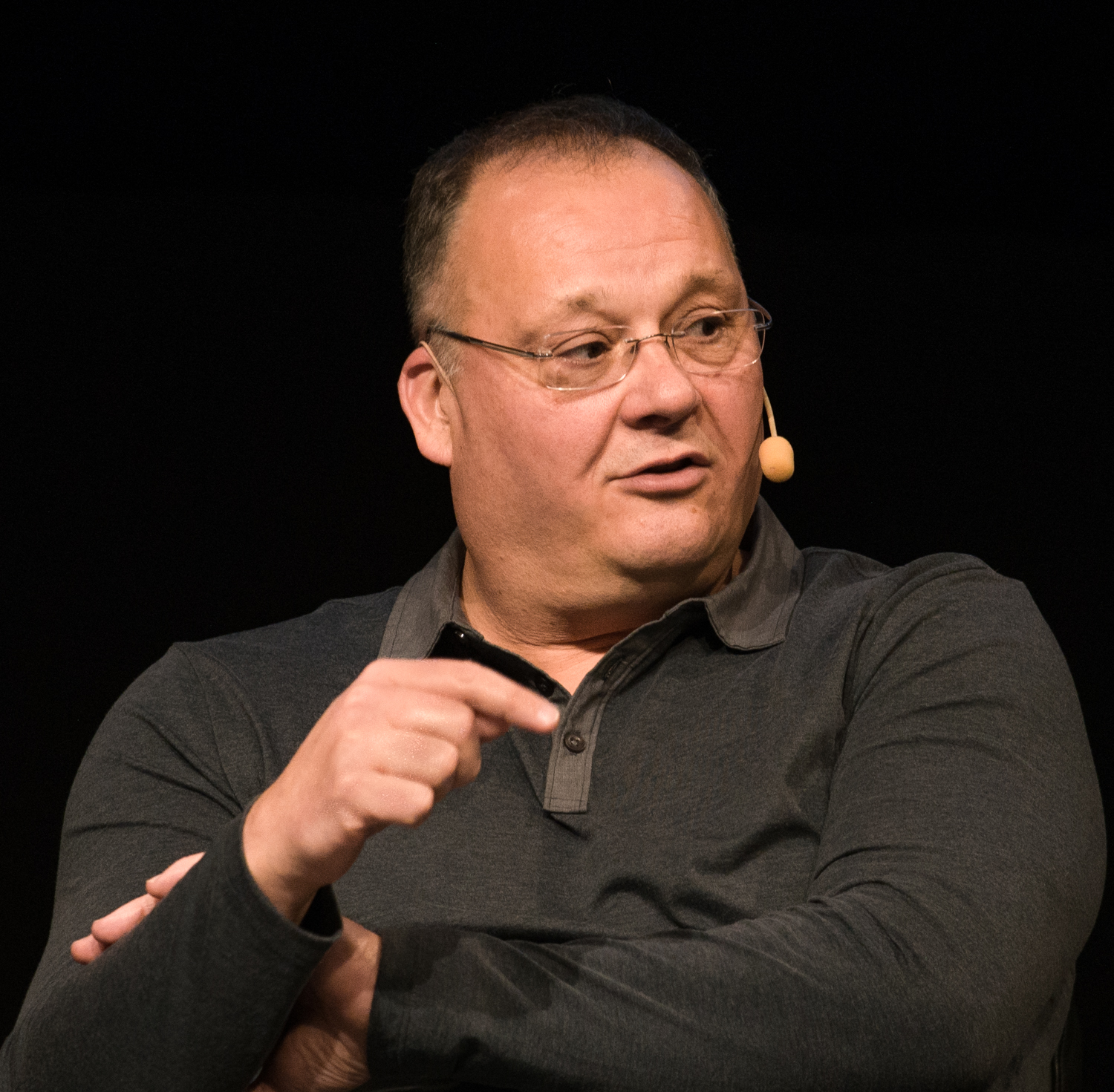
- Mudde at a debate in 2018
- Born: 3 June 1967 (age 59); Geldrop, Netherlands
- Occupation: Political scientist
- Awards: Stein Rokkan Prize for Comparative Social Science Research

Academic background
- Education: Leiden University (MA, PhD)

Cas Mudde (born 3 June 1967) is a Dutch political scientist who focuses on political extremism and populism in Europe and the United States. His research includes the areas of political parties, extremism, democracy, civil society, and European politics. Mudde identifies himself as a political leftist. He is the younger brother of the far-right activist Tim Mudde.

== Biography ==
Mudde was a visiting scholar at the Janet Prindle Institute for Ethics and visiting associate professor in the political science department at DePauw University in Greencastle, Indiana. From 1999 to 2002, he was an assistant professor at the University of Edinburgh, and from 2002 to 2010 he was an assistant and later associate professor at the University of Antwerp in Belgium. Since 2010, he has been teaching a first-year seminar on the Radical Right movement in Europe at DePauw University. He is an associate professor of Political Science at the University of Georgia's School of Public and International Affairs. He is also an adjunct professor at the Center for Research on Extremism (C-REX) at the University of Oslo.

Mudde is the co-founder and convener of the ECPR (European Consortium for Political Research) Standing Group on Extremism & Democracy. He is a board member of the IPSA (International Political Science Association) Committee on Concepts and Methods and serves on the editorial boards of academic journals such as Acta Politica, Democracy and Security, Patterns of Prejudice, Politics in Central Europe, and The Journal of Politics. In 2008, Mudde was awarded the Stein Rokkan Prize for Comparative Social Science Research. In 2022, he was elected a foreign member of the Royal Netherlands Academy of Arts and Sciences.

Mudde is the author of several books and articles. He is the younger brother of the far-right activist and punk rock vocalist, Tim Mudde. In the preface to The Ideology of the Extreme Right, he thanks him for the respect they still have for each other despite "differences of opinion". His book The Israeli Settler Movement: Assessing and Explaining Social Movement Success, co-authored with Sivan Hirsch-Hoefler, was published by Cambridge University Press in 2021.

== Bibliography ==
=== Books ===
- Mudde, Cas (2002). The ideology of the extreme right. Manchester University Press. hdl:20.500.12657/35009. ISBN 9781847790118.
- Mudde, Cas; Eatwell, Roger (2004). Western democracies and the new extreme right challenge. London New York: Routledge. ISBN 9780415369718.
- Mudde, Cas (2005). Racist extremism in Central and Eastern Europe. London New York: Routledge. ISBN 9780415355940.
- Mudde, Cas (2007). Populist radical right parties in Europe. Cambridge, UK New York: Cambridge University Press. ISBN 9780511341434. (View Table of contents, Introduction, and Index.)
- Mudde, Cas (2017). SYRIZA: The Failure of the Populist Promise. London: Palgrave Macmillan. ISBN 978-3-319-47478-6.
- Mudde, Cas; Kaltwasser, Cristóbal Rovira (2017). Populism: A Very Short Introduction. Oxford: Oxford University Press. ISBN 9780190234874.
- Mudde, Cas (2019). The Far Right Today. Cambridge: Polity Press. ISBN 978-1-5095-3683-2.
- Mudde, Cas; Hirsch-Hoefler, Sivan (2021). The Israeli Settler Movement: Assessing and Explaining Social Movement Success. Cambridge University Press. ISBN 978-1107138643.

=== Journal articles ===
- Mudde, Cas (January 2004). "The populist Zeitgeist". Government and Opposition. 39 (4): 541–563. doi:10.1111/j.1477-7053.2004.00135.x. S2CID 67833953. Online.
- Mudde, Cas; March, Luke (April 2005). "What's left of the radical left? The European radical left after 1989: decline and mutation". Comparative European Politics. 3 (1): 23–49. doi:10.1057/palgrave.cep.6110052. S2CID 55197396.
- Mudde, Cas; De Lange, Sarah L. (December 2005). "Political extremism in Europe". European Political Science. 4 (4): 476–488. doi:10.1057/palgrave.eps.2210056. S2CID 154045990.
- Mudde, Cas (November 2010). "The populist radical right: a pathological normalcy". West European Politics. 33 (6): 1167–1186. doi:10.1080/01402382.2010.508901. hdl:2043/6127. S2CID 76656703.
- Mudde, Cas; Ambrose, Emma (June 2015). "Canadian Multiculturalism and the Absence of the Far Right". Nationalism and Ethnic Politics. 21 (2): 213–236. doi:10.1080/13537113.2015.1032033. S2CID 145773856.
