= Techno-fascism (Japanese) =

Retrospective historiographical concept of Japanese fascism

Techno-fascism is a retrospective historiographical concept, coined by historian Janis Mimura, to analyze the ideology and policies of the reform bureaucrats in the Empire of Japan and Manchukuo during the 1930s and 1940s. Mimura defines the system as a "radical, authoritarian form of technocracy" that successfully fused the "totalist" state with military and bureaucratic planning agencies.

The term expands upon Georges Gurvitch's earlier definition of "techno-bureaucratic fascism." It serves as a theoretical framework to bridge the gap between postwar Marxist historiography that primarily focused on the monopoly capitalism and imperialism of the zaibatsu, and political scientist Masao Maruyama's focus on how the psychological pathologies of the Japanese state created a system of irresponsibility.

== Historiography ==
Within the broader debate on Emperor-system fascism, the concept of techno-fascism argues that the true architects of Japan's wartime state were not traditionalist conservatives or the fanatical military officers of the Imperial Way Faction, but rather a class of young and highly educated technocrats.

These planners viewed both classical laissez-faire capitalism and Soviet communism as obsolete in the face of the Great Depression and modern total war. Instead, they embraced fascism as an modern third way, rejecting the agrarian views of traditional right-wing factions in favor of rationalization, technological planning, and a managerial state prioritizing the "organization man" and public profits over private enterprise.

The Emperor system was incorporated into this system, as the emperor's divine mythos provided the necessary spiritual and cultural legitimacy to enforce an authoritarian economic plan upon the populace.

== Political dynamics and postwar legacy ==
The techno-fascist system relied on technocrats acquiring power by creating unaccountable "supra-ministerial organs and agencies" within the bureaucracy. This allowed them to collaborate with right-wing politicians and military figures in the Imperial Rule Assistance Association, which overhauled the government into a single-party state with absolute power.

However, this collaboration was fundamentally unstable. As Japan began faring poorly in World War II, the military pushed to continue campaigns past the point of being feasible. Consequently, leading reform bureaucrats like Nobusuke Kishi left the government in 1944.

As the reform bureaucrats possessed no independent political constituency for their techno-fascist programs, this lack of formal political accountability worked to their advantage post-war. Because their status as unelected, behind-the-scenes officials meant they had little "blood on their hands" in the eyes of the Allied occupation, Kishi and his colleagues were retained to help rebuild and industrialize postwar Japan, eventually staging a return to democratic politics in the 1950s. Kishi served as prime minister of Japan from 1957 to 1960.

== See also ==
- Reform bureaucrats
- Emperor-system fascism
- Statism in Shōwa Japan
- Dirigisme
- Managerial state
