= Centrism =

Alignment in the middle of the left–right political spectrum

Centrism is the range of political ideologies that exist between left-wing politics and right-wing politics on the left–right political spectrum. It is associated with those who strongly support moderate policies, as well as those who are not strongly aligned with left-wing or right-wing policies. Those who identify as centrist generally support gradual political change. Today, centrism is commonly associated with liberalism, radical centrism, and some traditions of agrarianism. It should not be confused with syncretism (the combination of elements across the political spectrum) or big tent parties (parties that cover wide spectra of beliefs).

Centrist parties typically hold the middle position between major left-wing and right-wing parties, though they may hold the left-leaning or right-leaning vote if there are no viable parties in a given direction. Parties and politicians have various incentives to move toward or away from the centre, depending on how they seek votes. Centrist parties in multi-party systems can hold a strong position in forming coalition governments as they can accommodate both left-wing and right-wing parties, but they are often junior partners in these coalitions and are unable to enact their own policies. These parties are weaker in first-past-the-post voting than proportional representation systems. Centrist populist parties take centrist positions as a result of their opposition to the government, as opposed to left-wing or right-wing populism.

Centrism developed with the left–right political spectrum during the French Revolution, when assemblymen associated with neither the radical liberals nor the reactionaries sat between the two groups. Liberalism became the dominant centrist ideology in the 18th century, challenging both conservatism and socialism. Agrarianism briefly existed as a major European centrist movement in the late-19th and early-20th centuries. Centrism became more influential in the later 20th century with the rise of neoliberalism and the dissolution of the Soviet Union. Centrism has declined following the 2008 financial crisis, with an increase in radical politics and political polarization.

== Ideology and political positions ==
Centrism most commonly refers to a set of moderate political beliefs between left-wing politics and right-wing politics. Individuals who describe themselves as centrist may hold strong beliefs that align with moderate politics, or they may identify as centrist because they do not hold particularly strong left-wing or right-wing beliefs. In some cases, individuals who simultaneously hold strong left-wing beliefs and strong right-wing beliefs may also describe themselves as centrist.

As with all ideological groups, the exact boundaries of what constitutes centrism are not perfectly defined. Its placement on the left–right political spectrum makes its position clearer when placed relative to other ideologies. Whether political positions are considered centrist can change over time; when radical positions become more widely accepted in society, they can become centrist positions. The preferences of the median citizen are associated with centrism, as they are in the middle between opposing ideologies on the political spectrum.

Although the left-centre-right trichotomy is well established in political science, some individuals far from the political centre reframe where the center is or whether it exists. In particular, some on the far-right allege that the centre is leftist, while some on the far-left allege that the centre is rightist. Likewise, they may also allege that their more moderate counterparts, the centre-left and the centre-right, ought to be grouped with the centre because they are insufficiently radical.

Liberalism is generally associated with the political centre. Both left-leaning and right-leaning variants of liberalism may be grouped within a broader understanding of centrism. Social liberalism combines centrist economic positions with progressive stances on social and cultural issues; it is more common in European nations with strong conservative movements. Right-leaning economic liberalism is more common in nations with strong Christian democratic movements.

Green parties, usually associated with left-wing politics, have a history of centrist economic policies in Central and Eastern Europe. Christian democracy, often considered a centre-right ideology, is sometimes grouped with the centre. Some variants of agrarianism, a political philosophy associated with the interests of farmers and others associated with agriculture, may also be grouped with the centre. Agrarian parties often developed in European countries where there was not a strong liberal movement, and vice versa, but they became less relevant by the mid-20th century.

Radical centrism is a form of centrism defined by its rejection of the left–right dichotomy or of ideology in general. Liberal scepticism and neo-republicanism can both be elements of radical centrism. Third Way politics is a radical centrist approach taken to find a middle ground between capitalism and socialism.

Though populism is commonly associated with strong left-wing or right-wing beliefs, centrist populism is critical of the political system independently of social, economic, and cultural issues. Centrist populist parties often do not have a strong ideological component, instead making anti-establishment politics the core of their message to capitalise on voter dissatisfaction and receive protest votes. These parties are most common in Central and Eastern Europe.

Centrism tends to advocate for gradual change within a political system, holding that it is preferable to reactionary or revolutionary politics. Support for a middle class is a defining trait of centrism. In some countries, centrist coalitions are associated with liberal welfare state, but these programs are generally less inclusive than those organised under more left-wing governments. Centrists may support some redistributive policies, but they oppose the total abolition of the upper class. Centrist liberalism seeks institutional reform, but it prioritises prudence when enacting change. European centrist parties can be in favour of European integration and were the primary movers in the development of the European Union.

== Political function ==
=== Elections and retention of power ===
In multi-party systems, the centre is challenged by parties that seek to undermine the legitimacy of the current political system. The left and the right and have different positions on how the government should function, which prevents them from unifying against the centre and gives the centre an opportunity to retain power. According to the median voter theorem, in single-winner elections candidates are incentivised to move toward the political centre in order to win.

Centrist parties face some intrinsic disadvantages when competing with left-wing and right-wing parties. Elections based on first-past-the-post voting or proportional representation provide less incentive for parties to hold centrist positions. Proportional representation systems weaken centrist parties because they incentivise the capture of specific voters instead of the general population. The popularity of centrism in the Western world is contradicted by the relative electoral weakness of centrist parties. One possible explanation for the paradox is that centrists may be perceived as lacking the leadership or capability demonstrated by leaders of other ideologies. Another is that centrists are unable to increase their vote share because the ideological space around them is already occupied by other parties.

Politicians with high approval might move to the centre to capitalise on their popularity with a larger voter base, while those seen as uncharismatic or incompetent may shift away from the centre to capture more reliable activist voters who will invest more into the politician's campaign. Opponents of centrism may describe it as opportunistic. Centrist-controlled governments are much rarer than left-wing or right-wing governments. While approximately 30% of world leaders were centrist in the 1950s and 1960s, this declined to approximately 15% by 2020. Centrist dictatorships rarely occur.

=== Coalition building ===
Most political party systems lean toward the centre, where centre-left and centre-right parties compromise with centrist parties. Centrist parties are typically found in the middle of a party system, leading to mixed use of the term centre to refer to centrist parties and to this middle position regardless of a party's ideological stance. Conversely, some centrist parties will only be challenged from one direction instead of facing both left-wing and right-wing challengers, preventing it from taking its typical location in the middle of a party system. What constitutes the middle of a political system is unique to each nation, while ideological centrism is a political stance that exists internationally.

Coalition building typically occurs around the political centre, giving centrist parties hold a position in the formation of coalition governments, as they can accommodate both left-wing and right-wing parties. This gives them additional leverage in the formation of a minority government. When radical parties become viable, forming a coalition with the centre can force them to moderate. Once in a coalition, the centrist party is typically a junior partner that has little ability to enact its own policy goals. Party systems with a strong centrist element are associated with lower interparty conflict.

=== Political polarisation ===
The overall effect of centrist parties on a political system is a subject of debate in political science, and it is not always clear whether they encourage or discourage political polarisation, or whether they benefit or suffer from it. One unanswered question in political philosophy is whether centrist parties create centripetal or centrifugal party systems. When centrist parties exert a centripetal force on other parties, it causes left-wing and right-wing parties to move closer to the centre and creates political stability. Alternatively, they may exert a centrifugal force in which left-wing and right-wing parties move away from the centre to pressure the centrist party into choosing a side, causing political instability.

French political scientist Maurice Duverger argued that politics naturally drifts away from the centre into a two-party system and that a centrist party is an unnatural combination of the centre-left and centre-right. Italian political scientist Giovanni Sartori argued that centrism is the default in a political system, but that the existence of a centrist party prevents the left and the right from moving toward the centre and encourages polarisation. American economist Anthony Downs proposed a model in which a centrist party emerges after the left-wing and right-wing parties diverge from a centrist-leaning public. Dutch political scientist Hans Daalder rejected the concept of a singular political centre entirely.

When parties become more extreme, disaffected moderates may be enticed to join centrist parties when they would otherwise have been unwilling to join an opposing party. More broadly, polarisation can lead to the fragmentation of the left and right into multiple parties, allowing a centrist party to perpetually be the Condorcet winner. Polarisation may also weaken a centrist party if both ends of a polarised society are made to oppose centrism.

=== Regional variation ===
Centrist parties make up a specific party family and have commonalities across different nations and political systems. In the Nordic countries where social democracy dominates politics, centrism competes alongside the centre-right to form a rightward flank. Centrist liberalism has only a minor presence in the Middle East, where it is overshadowed by leftism and Islamism. More developed countries in Latin America often have prominent centrist parties supported by the middle class. These have historically included the Radical Civic Union of Argentina, the Brazilian Democratic Movement, the Radical Party of Chile, and the Colorado Party of Uruguay. Christian democracy, usually a conservative movement, serves a similar role in Latin America as its opposition to more rightward politics moves it toward a centrist or centre-left position. Some political parties label themselves as centrist but do not hold centrist positions. These are typically more right-wing parties such as the centre-right Union of the Democratic Centre in Spain and the far-right Centre Party in the Netherlands. Relative to left-wing and right-wing parties, centrist parties are infrequently studied in political science.

== History ==
=== 18th and 19th centuries ===
Centrism is part of the left–right political spectrum that developed during the French Revolution. When the National Assembly was organised, reactionary conservatives coalesced in the seats to the speaker's right, while the radicals sat on the speaker's left. The moderates who were not affiliated with either faction sat in the centre seats, and they came to be known as the centrists. While liberalism began as a centre-left challenger to conservatism, it came to occupy the political centre of Western politics at the beginning of the 19th century as it also opposed radicalism and socialism. Liberal opposition to clericalism and support for individual rights developed in opposition to conservatism, establishing the ideals that would accompany liberalism as it became the predominant centrist ideology in Europe.

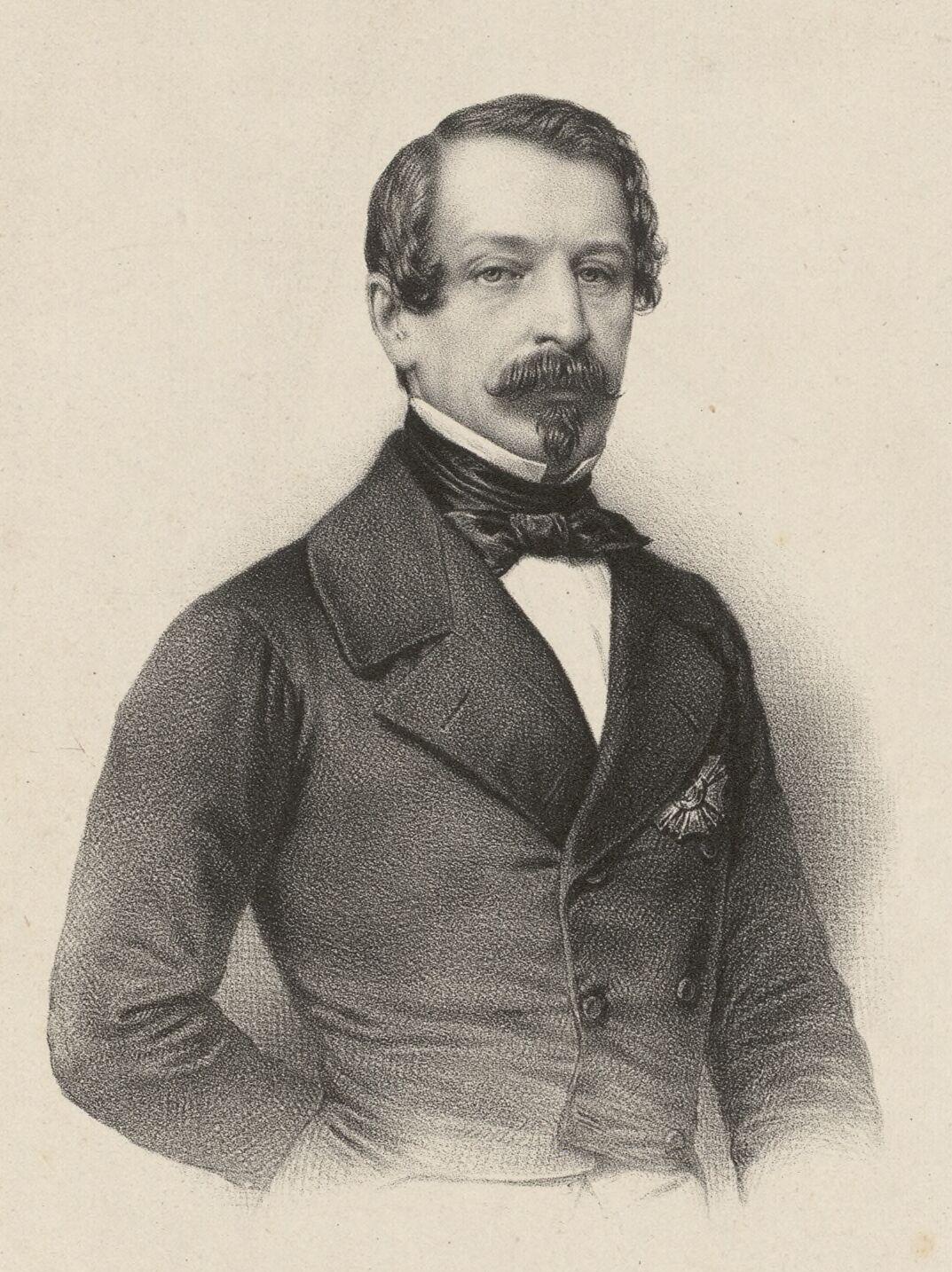
Napoleon III and his Bonapartism drew conservatism in France to the centre.

The political centre became a major force in England and France following the Napoleonic Wars. English centrism came from the Whigs, such as Henry Peter Brougham and Thomas Babington Macaulay. French centrism was supported by the Doctrinaires, such as Pierre Paul Royer-Collard and François Guizot. The Bonapartism of Napoleon III brought French conservatism to the centre when it maintained an element of working class revolution. Empires were forced to maintain the political centre, avoiding reactionary or revolutionary politics that could have affected their stability. Centrist liberalism was slower to develop outside of the great powers of Western Europe.

By the 1830s, conservatism and radicalism in Western Europe began a shift toward moderation as they accepted ideas associated with centrist liberalism. The United Kingdom was spared from the many revolutions during the early 19th century as its conservatives developed a centrist ideology that combined liberalism and conservatism, called enlightened conservatism, and expressed willingness to compromise with the nation's strong radical element. As radicalism declined in Western Europe, liberalism and conservatism became the two dominant political movements. The United States saw a centrist liberal movement develop in the late-19th century through the Mugwumps of the Republican Party. The radical movement gave way to centrism after the 1870s as they both coalesced around ideals of republicanism, secularism, self-education, cooperation, land reform, and internationalism. Toward the end of the 19th century, agrarianism became a significant political movement in Europe to represent farmers' interests.

Western social science intertwined itself with centrism in the 19th century. As research universities became more common, advocacy for centrist reform was taken up by academics. Instead of engaging in direct activism, they considered social issues and presented their conclusions as objective science. Other ideological groups did not have success in this endeavour, as taking strong partisan stances risked one's reputation. Centrist liberals in Europe accepted scientific racism in the 19th century, but did so less than its primary advocates, and rejected the related concept of social Darwinism. Instead of the idea that non-white races could not achieve European-style civilisation, centrist liberals believed that they could but it would take them longer to do so.

=== World Wars and Cold War ===
Centrist liberalism was one of the two major global ideological groups at the beginning of the 20th century, where it was challenged by right-wing conservatism and Catholicism. Centrism faced increased pressure beginning in the interwar period as left-wing politics saw a resurgence, meaning centrism was challenged from both directions. Agrarianism lost much of its influence in the 1930s as nations fell under right-wing dictatorships, and its return in the 1940s was short-lived as nations became under communist rule. The Nordic countries, which were mostly spared from both movements, were the only nations to retain strong agrarian parties. The Holocaust widely ended support for any scientific racism and eugenics espoused by centrists. Following World War II, middle-class centrist parties in developed countries became less common as they moved leftward or rightward.

The Catholic-inspired centrist Christian Democracy party dominated Italian politics in the decades following the Second World War.

In the immediate aftermath of World War II, Italy was dominated by the party Christian Democracy. Under the leadership of Alcide De Gasperi, it created a centrist grouping with centre-left and centre-right to combat the Italian Communist Party. The group fractured during a leftward shift in the 1950s and 1960s as the leadership invited socialists into the party, hoping to deprive the Communist Party of an ally. This created a scenario in which the Christian Democrats expressed centrist positions but were the rightmost of Italy's major parties and took on a more conservative role.

Turkey developed a two-party system with two centrist parties in the 1950s. The parties were instead motivated by demographics: the Republican People's Party was supported by urban voters and the military while Democrat Party was the party of rural voters and businessmen. This system fell apart by the 1960s as polarisation grew and radical parties developed. Industrialisation reduced the appeal of agrarianism in the post-war era. The Agrarian Parties of Sweden, Norway, and Finland changed their names to the Centre Party in 1958, 1959, and 1965, respectively. This left Denmark as the only nation with a major self-proclaimed Agrarian Party, but it also described itself as liberal beginning in 1963.

Fiji implemented a political system designed to encourage centrism in an ethnically divided nation as it transitioned away from colonial rule in 1965. Each voter was to vote for four candidates, each for a distinct ethnic group. This failed to produce a centrist government, as in effect it solidified the ethnic division in government. As post-colonial party systems developed in the Middle East, the influence of one-party states varied. Parties like the Arab Socialist Union in Egypt and the General People's Congress in Yemen acted as restraints on political elites to keep them from deviating from the political centre. Anwar Sadat became president of Egypt, and in 1976 he split the ruling Arab Socialist Union into three parties based on its left, centre, and right factions. Rule was maintained through what became the centrist National Democratic Party, effectively controlling Egyptian politics and marginalising the other factions. The fall of dictatorships in countries such as Argentina, Chile, Peru, and Portugal in the 1980s was met by centrist parties that became the primary forces in transitioning the nations to democracy.

=== 1990s–present ===
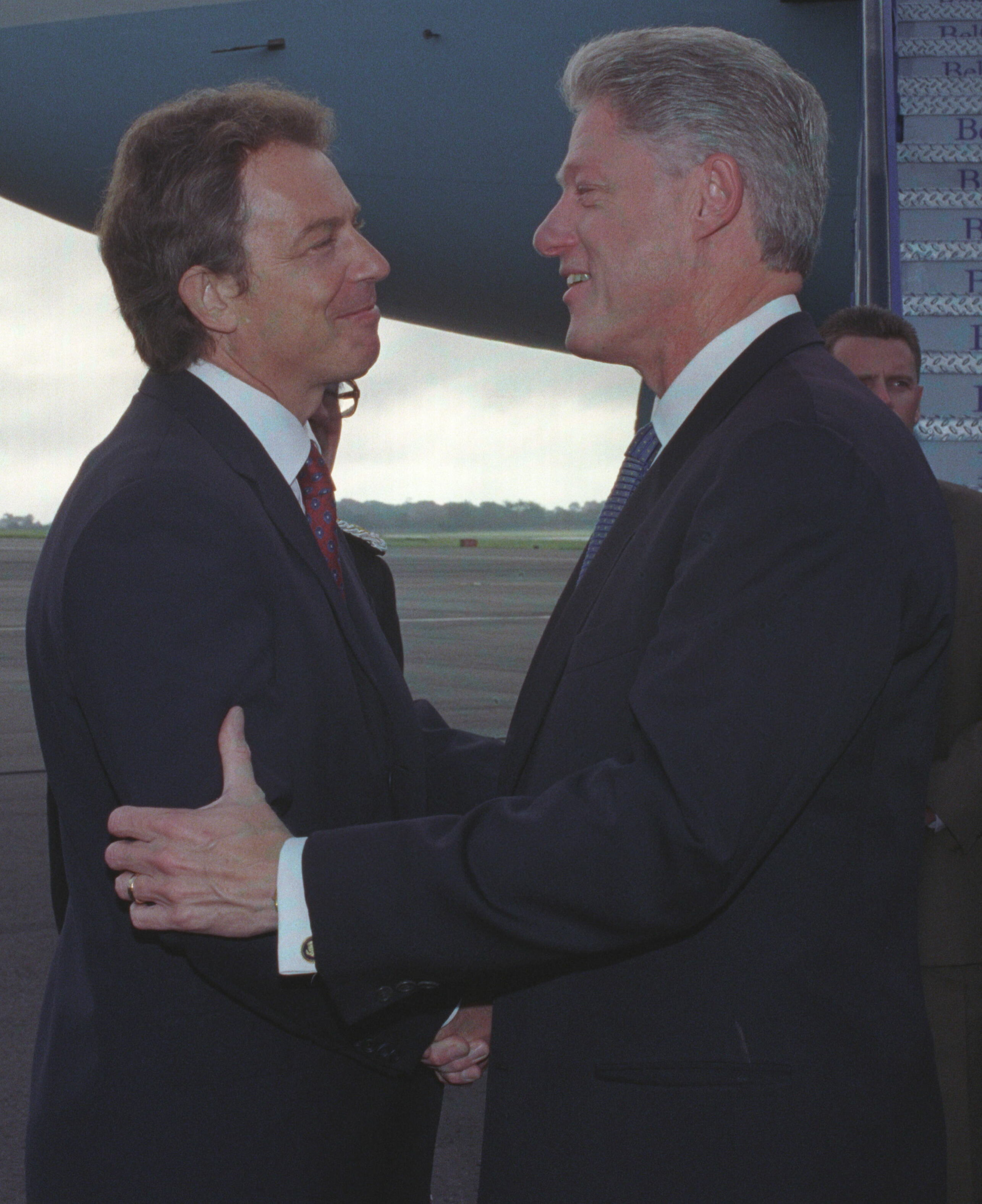
U.S. President Bill Clinton greets British Prime Minister Tony Blair in 1998. Both were influential Third Way leaders of the 1990s.

Following the dissolution of the Soviet Union in the 1990s, centrist liberalism was seen as the dominant force in politics. The centre-left and the centre-right both moved closer to the centre in the 1990s and 2000s. The centre-right, previously dominated by neoliberalism, became more accepting of the welfare state, and it showed more support for combatting poverty and inequality. This included the "kinder, gentler America" championed by George H. W. Bush in the United States, Die Neue Mitte (transl. The New Centre) of Gerhard Schröder in Germany, the British "Thatcherism with a grey face" led by John Major, and the anti-neoliberalism of Mexican president Vicente Fox. The centre-left adopted Third Way policies, emphasising that it was neither left nor right but pragmatic. This adopted ideas popular among the centre-right, including balanced budgets and low taxes. Among these movements were British New Labour led by Tony Blair. Social democratic parties became more accepting of supply-side economics, austerity policies, and reduction of welfare programs. Some authoritarian powers, such as China and Russia, resisted the western liberal consensus.

In the Pacific, New Caledonia did not form a strong centrist movement until the 1990s as a consequence of the independence question. Conservative groups had actively suppressed centrist figures like Caledonian Union leader Maurice Lenormand, who was accused of being a communist and prosecuted for allegedly organising the bombing of his own party newspaper's headquarters in the 1960s. Taiwan's political system, already inclined toward centrism, saw its two major parties move closer to centrism in the late 1990s as newer parties developed on either side.

Following a long period of strong left-wing and right-wing movements, Latin American nations trended toward centrism in the 2000s. This came about as the nations' economies strengthened and the reduction of wealth inequality created a larger middle class. Following the pink tide that saw several left-wing politicians take office, those in democratic nations adopted relatively moderate policies, including Luiz Inácio Lula da Silva in Brazil, Michelle Bachelet in Chile, Mauricio Funes in El Salvador, and Tabaré Vázquez and José Mujica in Uruguay. These nations implemented the Washington Consensus, which mixed deregulation and privatization with the use of social programs. In many Latin American nations, opposing presidential candidates campaigned on similar platforms and often supported retaining their predecessors' policies without any significant changes, shifting the focus of elections to personality over ideology.

Support for centrism declined globally following the 2008 financial crisis as it was challenged by populism and political polarization. As of 2015, centrists made up a plurality in most European countries.

== See also ==
=== Politics ===
- Apoliticism
- Center squeeze
- Centrism by country
- Centrist Party
  - List of centrist political parties
- Centrist populism
- Horseshoe theory
- Independent politician
- Independent voter
- Political moderate
- Nonpartisanship
- Soft left
- Political syncretism
- Third Way
- Triangulation (politics)

=== Logic ===
- Argument to moderation and Law of excluded middle
- False balance
- Golden mean
- Neutrality
- Overton window
- View from nowhere
