= Economics of fascism =

Economic policies of fascist governments

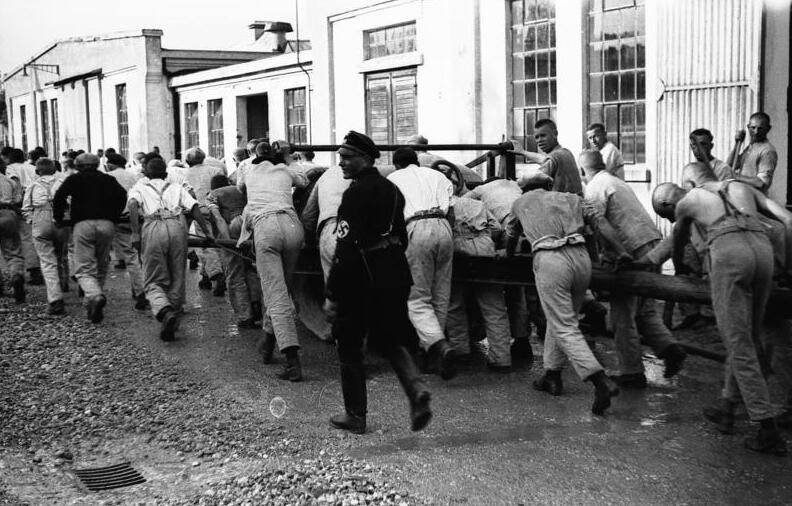
Prisoners in a Nazi concentration camp doing forced labour

Historians and other scholars disagree on the question of whether a specifically fascist type of economic policy can be said to exist. David Baker argues that there is an identifiable economic system in fascism that is distinct from those advocated by other ideologies, comprising essential characteristics that fascist nations shared. Payne, Paxton, Sternhell et al. argue that while fascist economies share some similarities, there is no distinctive form of fascist economic organization. Gerald Feldman and Timothy Mason argue that fascism is distinguished by an absence of coherent economic ideology and an absence of serious economic thinking. They state that the decisions taken by fascist leaders cannot be explained within a logical economic framework.

Fascist movements tended to not have any fixed economic principles, other than a general desire that the economy should help build a strong nation. As such, scholars argue that fascists had no economic ideology, but they did follow popular opinion, the interests of their donors and the necessities of World War II. In general, fascist governments exercised control over private property but they did not nationalize it. Scholars also noted that big business developed an increasingly close partnership with the Italian Fascist and German Nazi governments after they took power. Business leaders supported the government's political and military goals. In exchange, the government pursued economic policies that maximized the profits of its business allies.

Fascism had a complex relationship with capitalism, both supporting and opposing different aspects of it at different times and in different countries. In general, fascists held an instrumental view of capitalism, regarding it as a tool that may be useful or not, depending on circumstances. Fascists aimed to promote what they considered the national interests of their countries; they supported private property and the profit motive because they considered them beneficial to the economic development of a nation, and because they held social Darwinist beliefs that the success of the wealthy proved their superiority and that interfering with natural selection in the economy would burden the nation by preserving weak individuals. However, fascists also commonly sought to eliminate the autonomy of large-scale capitalism from the state, and they opposed the perceived decadence, hedonism, and cosmopolitanism of the wealthy in contrast to the idealized discipline, patriotism and moral virtue of the middle classes.

While other Western capitalist countries strove for increased state ownership of industry during the same period, Nazi Germany transferred public ownership into the private sector and handed over some public services to private organizations, mostly those affiliated with the Nazi Party. According to historian Richard Overy, the Nazi war economy was a mixed economy that combined free markets with central planning and described the economy as being somewhere in between the command economy of the Soviet Union and the capitalist system of the United States. Others have described Nazi Germany as being corporatist, authoritarian capitalist, or totalitarian capitalist. Fascist Italy has been described as corporatist.

== Overview ==
The first fascist movements arose in the last years of World War I. They were a form of radical nationalism carrying a promise of national rebirth; they blamed liberalism, socialism, and materialism for the decadence they perceived in society and culture, and they expressed an appreciation for violence and the role of leadership and willpower in shaping society.

One significant fascist economic belief was that prosperity would naturally follow once the nation has achieved a cultural and spiritual re-awakening. Different members of a fascist party would often make completely opposite statements about the economic policies they supported. Once in power, fascists usually adopted whatever economic program they believed to be most suitable for their political goals. Long-lasting fascist regimes (such as that of Benito Mussolini in Italy) made drastic changes to their economic policy from time to time.

Fascism rose to power by taking advantage of the political and economic climate of the 1920s and 1930s, particularly the deep polarization of some European societies (such as the Kingdom of Italy and Weimar Germany), which were democracies with elected parliaments dominated by supporters of laissez-faire capitalism and Marxist socialism, whose intense opposition to each other made it difficult for stable governments to be formed. Fascists used this situation as an argument against democracy, which they viewed as ineffective and weak. Fascist regimes generally came into existence in times of crisis, when economic elites, landowners and business owners feared that a revolution or uprising was imminent. Fascists allied themselves with the economic elites, promising to protect their social status and to suppress any potential socialist revolution. In exchange, the elites were asked to subordinate their interests to a broader nationalist project, and thus fascist economic policies generally protect inequality and privilege while also featuring an important role for state intervention in the economy.

Fascist rhetoric often opposed both international socialism and free-market capitalism, arguing that their views represented a third position. They claimed to provide a realistic economic alternative that was neither laissez-faire capitalism nor communism. They favored corporatism and class collaboration, believing that the existence of inequality and social hierarchy was beneficial (contrary to the views of socialists), while also arguing that the state had a role in mediating relations between classes (contrary to the views of liberal capitalists). An important aspect of fascist economies was economic dirigism, meaning an economy where the government often subsidizes favorable companies and exerts strong directive influence over investment, as opposed to having a merely regulatory role. In general, fascist economies were based on private property and private initiative, but these were contingent upon service to the state.

Fascist governments encouraged the pursuit of private profit and offered many benefits to large businesses, but they demanded in return that all economic activity should serve the national interest. Anti-fascist historian Gaetano Salvemini argued in 1936 that fascism makes taxpayers responsible to private enterprise because "the State pays for the blunders of private enterprise. ... Profit is private and individual. Loss is public and social". Stanley Payne argues that fascist movements defended the principle of private property because they held it to be "inherent to the freedom and spontaneity of the individual personality", but that they also aimed to eliminate the autonomy or in some cases the existence of large-scale capitalism. Jürgen Kuczynski characterizes a fascist economy as a type of "monopoly capitalism", which preserves the "fundamental traits of capitalist production", such as the fact that production is carried out for the market by privately owned firms which employ workers for a certain wage. He argues that fascism is "nothing but a particular form of government within capitalist society", which features a major role for the state, as was also the case in some early capitalist societies of previous centuries.

Fascism operated from a social Darwinist view of human relations that idolizes the seemingly strongest individuals and represses the weaker individuals. In terms of economic practice, this meant promoting the interests of successful businessmen while destroying trade unions and other organizations of the proletariat. Fascist governments declared the trade union movement illegal and replaced it with labor organizations under the direct control of the government, which ensured that workers could not undertake any effective economic action. Membership in these labor organizations was compulsory, their leaders were appointed by the ruling party rather than elected by the members and they were presented as a new type of unions which would serve to harmonize the interests of workers and businesses. However, in practice they primarily served the interests of major business owners, who were able to lobby the ruling party to appoint the leaders they desired. In order to maintain and increase the profits of industry, fascist states eliminated the possibility of mass protest and then cut wages either directly or indirectly. Strikes were strictly banned and prison sentences could be given to employees who stopped working as a group.

Fascist governments in both Italy and Germany privatized state-owned enterprises at certain times. These privatizations were carried out in the early stages of both regimes (1922–1925 for Italy and 1934–1937 for Germany) and represented a reversal of the policies of the democratic governments which had preceded them. The democratic governments had brought a number of industries under state ownership and the fascists decided to return them to private ownership. In doing so, they went against the mainstream economic trends of their time, when most Western governments were increasing state ownership. Fascist privatization policies were driven by a desire to secure the support of wealthy industrialists as well as by the need to increase government revenues in order to balance budgets. Significantly, fascist governments were among the first to undertake large-scale privatizations in modern times.

In most cases, fascists discouraged or banned foreign trade, supporting protectionism. Fascists believed that too much international trade would make the national economy dependent on international capital and therefore vulnerable to international economic sanctions. Economic self-sufficiency, known as autarky, was a major goal of most fascist governments. Furthermore, fascism was highly militaristic and as such fascists often significantly increased military spending. Recruitment into the military was one of the main policies used by fascist governments to reduce unemployment.

=== Fascism and capitalism ===
Fascism had complicated relations with capitalism, which changed over time and differed between fascist states. Fascists have commonly sought to eliminate the autonomy of large-scale capitalism and leave it in control of the state. However, fascism does support private property rights and the existence of a market economy and very wealthy individuals. Thus, fascist ideology included both pro-capitalist and anti-capitalist elements. As Sternhell et al. argue:

The Fascist revolution sought to change the nature of the relationship between the individual and the collective without destroying the impetus of economic activity –– the profit motive, or its foundation –– private property, or its necessary framework –– the market economy. This was one aspect of the novelty of fascism; the Fascist revolution was supported by an economy determined by the law of markets.

In practice, the economic policies of fascist governments were largely based on pragmatic goals rather than ideological principles, and they were mainly concerned with building a strong national economy, promoting autarky, and being able to support a major war effort.

== Economy of Fascist Italy ==
=== Liberal phase (1922–1925) ===
The National Fascist Party of Benito Mussolini came to power in Italy in 1922 at the end of a period of social unrest. Working class activism was at a high point, militant trade unions were organizing increasingly frequent strikes to demand workers' rights and the Italian Socialist Party was making significant electoral gains. This caused widespread fear among Italian business circles and part of the middle class, who believed that a communist revolution was imminent. With the traditional right-wing parties appearing incapable of dealing with the situation, King Victor Emmanuel III turned to the young Fascist movement, which he considered to hold a hardline right-wing orientation by violently suppressing strikes and appointed Benito Mussolini prime minister. Soon after his rise to power, Mussolini defined his economic stance by saying: "The [Fascist] government will accord full freedom to private enterprise and will abandon all intervention in private economy".

Specifically, during the first four years of the new regime under a multiparty coalition government (1922–1925) the Fascists had a generally laissez-faire economic policy under the Finance Minister Alberto De Stefani, a former stalwart leader in the Center Party. Free competition was encouraged and De Stefani initially also reduced taxes, regulations and trade restrictions on the whole. De Stefani reduced government expenditure and balanced the budget. Some previous legislation introduced by the Socialists, such as the inheritance tax, was repealed. During this period, prosperity increased and by mid-1920s industrial production had passed its wartime peak, but this was accompanied with inflation. Overall, this was a period when Fascist economic policy mostly followed classical liberal lines, with the added features of attempting to stimulate domestic production (rather than foreign trade) and balancing the budget.

This was also a period when the Italian Fascist government undertook a large-scale privatization policy, which was among the first such policies in the modern world. Fascist Italy was the only country that sold state-owned enterprises and assets to private firms in the 1920s; the next country to adopt this approach was Nazi Germany in the 1930s. The Italian privatizations included the sale of most state-owned telephone networks and services as well as the former state monopoly on match sale. The state monopoly on life insurance was eliminated, the metal machinery firm Ansaldo was returned to private ownership (after having been nationalized by the previous government) and private firms were awarded concessions to set up tolls on motorways.

=== Corporatist transition (1925–1929) ===
Nevertheless, "once Mussolini acquired a firmer hold of power ... laissez-faire was progressively abandoned in favour of government intervention, free trade was replaced by protection[ism] and economic objectives were increasingly couched in exhortations and military terminology". De Stefani was forced to resign in 1925 because his policy of free trade was opposed by many Italian business leaders, who favored protectionism and subsidies to insulate domestic business from international competition. In 1926, Mussolini gave an impassioned speech demanding monetary policies to halt inflation and stabilize the Italian currency (the lira). He also took the final step of officially banning any kind of strike action. From 1927 to 1929, under the leadership of the new Finance Minister Alberto Beneduce, the Italian economy experienced a period of deflation, driven by the government's monetary policies.

=== Great Depression and mixed economy (1929–1935) ===
In 1929, Italy was hit hard by the Great Depression. The Italian economy, having just emerged from a period of monetary stabilization, was not ready for this shock and prices fell and production slowed. Unemployment rose from 300,787 in 1929 to 1,018,953 in 1933. Trying to handle the crisis, the Fascist government nationalized the holdings of large banks which had accrued significant industrial securities. The government also issued new securities to provide a source of credit for the banks and began enlisting the help of various cartels (consorzi) that had been created by Italian business leaders since 1922. The government offered recognition and support to these organizations in exchange for promises that they would manipulate prices in accordance with government priorities.

A number of mixed entities were formed, called instituti or enti nazionali, whose purpose it was to bring together representatives of the government and of the major businesses. These representatives discussed economic policy and manipulated prices and wages so as to satisfy both the wishes of the government and the wishes of business. The government considered this arrangement to be a success and Italian Fascists soon began to pride themselves on this outcome, saying they had survived the Great Depression without infringing on private property. In 1934, the Fascist Minister of Agriculture said: "While nearly everywhere else private property was bearing the major burdens and suffering from the hardest blows of the depression, in Italy, thanks to the actions of this Fascist government, private property not only has been saved, but has also been strengthened".

This economic model based on a partnership between government and business was soon extended to the political sphere in what came to be known as corporatism. From 1934 onwards, believing that Italy could have avoided the Great Depression if it had not been linked to international markets, Mussolini insisted that autarky should be one of the primary goals of his government's economic policy. To this end, the Fascists began to impose significant tariffs and other trade barriers. In 1934, Mussolini boasted that three-quarters of Italian businesses "is in the hands of the state".

Various banking and industrial companies were financially supported by the state. One of Mussolini's first acts was indeed to fund the metallurgical trust Ansaldo to the height of 400 million Liras. Following the deflation crisis which started in 1926, banks such as the Banco di Roma, the Banco di Napoli or the Banco di Sicilia were also assisted by the state. In 1933, Mussolini created the Istituto per la Ricostruzione Industriale (IRI) with the special aim of rescuing floundering companies. By 1939, the IRI controlled 20% of the Italian industry through government-linked companies (GLCs), including 75% of pig iron production and 90% of the shipbuilding industry.

Mussolini also adopted a Keynesian policy of government spending on public works to stimulate the economy. Between 1929 and 1934, public works spending tripled to overtake defense spending as the largest item of government expenditure. At this time, Mussolini said about Keynes that "despite the latter's prominent position as a Liberal", his work may be considered a "useful introduction to fascist economics". Italian Fascists also expressed great interest in the works of neoclassical economist Vilfredo Pareto. Pareto had argued that democracy was an illusion and that a ruling class always emerged and enriched itself. For him, the key question was how actively the rulers ruled and for this reason he called for a drastic reduction of the state and welcomed Mussolini's rule as a transition to this minimal state so as to liberate the "pure" economic forces. Fascist intellectuals were determined to foster economic development in order for the economy to "attain its productive maximum". They believed that their historic responsibility was to "develop to its ultimate conclusion the creative elements that remain alive in capitalism".

Italian Fascists and their precursors had always been focused on the need to bring about a more productive society through the economic collaboration of the classes, opposing class struggle. They believed in the critical importance of economic productivity as a revolutionary force and they were "productivists, rather than distributionists". Nevertheless, the Fascist government also made efforts to appear concerned with the real interests of its subjects in order to create a "consensual, charismatic regime" and to render the masses of the peninsula governable. Fascist ideologues argued that the discontent of the lower classes represented a potential threat to the "well-being, the internal security, the power and the existence of the state" and therefore measures had to be taken to alleviate this discontent. They also argued that a "minimal concern for the well-being of the labor force" served the national interest, by improving productive potential. For these reasons, the government pursued a complex social welfare and assistance program, which "compared favorably with the more advanced European nations" despite the lower level of industrial development on the Italian peninsula.

=== Autarky and wartime economy (1935–1943) ===
In 1935, following the Italian invasion of Ethiopia, the League of Nations imposed trade sanctions on Italy. This forced Italy to achieve autarky immediately and strengthened Mussolini's belief that economic self-sufficiency was vital to national security. The sanctions did not have their intended effects because the Italian government had already begun restricting trade and preparing for autarky. In particular, Italy imposed a severe ban on most imports and the government sought to persuade consumers to buy Italian-made products. For instance, it launched the slogan Preferite il Prodotto Italiano ("Buy Italian produce"). In May 1935, the government compelled individuals and businesses to turn over all foreign issued securities to the Bank of Italy (Banca d'Italia). On 15 July 1936, the economic sanctions on Italy were lifted, but the Fascists continued to insist on economic isolation.

Throughout the 1930s, the Italian economy maintained the corporatist model that had been established during the Great Depression. At the same time, Mussolini had also growing ambitions of extending Italy's foreign influence through both diplomacy and military intervention. After the invasion of Ethiopia, Italy began supplying both troops and equipment to the Spanish nationalists under General Francisco Franco, who were fighting in the Spanish Civil War against a leftist government. These foreign interventions required increased military spending and the Italian economy became increasingly subordinated to the needs of its armed forces. By 1939, Italy had the highest percentage of state-owned enterprises after the Soviet Union.

Finally, Italy's involvement in World War II as a member of the Axis powers required the establishment of a war economy. This put severe strain on the corporatist model since the war quickly started going badly for Italy and it became difficult for the government to persuade business leaders to finance what they saw as a military disaster. The Allied invasion of Italy in 1943 caused the Italian political structure and the economy to rapidly collapse. On the other hand, the Allies and the Germans took over the administration of the areas of Italy under their control. By the end of the war, the Italian economy had been all but destroyed—per capita income in 1944 was at its lowest point since the beginning of the 20th century.

== Economy of Nazi Germany ==
Adolf Hitler regarded economic issues as relatively unimportant. In 1922, Hitler proclaimed that "world history teaches us that no people has become great through its economy but that a people can very well perish thereby" and later concluded that "the economy is something of secondary importance". Hitler and the Nazis held a very strong idealist conception of history, which held that human events are guided by small numbers of exceptional individuals following a higher ideal. They believed that all economic concerns, being purely material, were unworthy of their consideration. Hitler went as far as to blame all previous German governments since Bismarck of having "subjugated the nation to materialism" by relying more on peaceful economic development instead of expansion through war.

For these reasons, the Nazis never had a clearly defined economic programme. The original "Twenty-Five Point Programme" of the party, adopted in 1920, listed several economic demands, but the degree to which the Nazis supported this programme in later years has been questioned. Several attempts were made in the 1920s to change some of the program or replace it entirely. For instance, Gottfried Feder proposed a new 39-point program (1924) that kept some of the old planks, replaced others and added many completely new ones. Hitler refused to allow any discussion of the party programme after 1925, ostensibly on the grounds that no discussion was necessary because the programme was "inviolable" and did not need any changes. At the same time, Hitler also never voiced public support for the programme and many historians argue that he was in fact privately opposed to it. Hitler did not mention any of the planks of the programme in his book Mein Kampf and only talked about it in passing as "the so-called programme of the movement".

Hitler called his political party "National Socialist", but he was clear to point out that his interpretation of socialism "has nothing to do with Marxian Socialism", saying that "Marxism is anti-property; true Socialism is not". At a later time, Hitler said: "Socialism! That is an unfortunate word altogether. ... What does socialism really mean? If people have something to eat and their pleasures, then they have their socialism". He also expressed a wish that he had called his party "social revolutionary" instead.

At one point, Hitler said in private that "I absolutely insist on protecting private property. ... In this sense, we must encourage private initiative". On yet another occasion, he qualified that statement by saying that the government should have the power to regulate the use of private property for the good of the nation. In spite of this, he later asserted: "It is my firm conviction that property rights ... must be unconditionally respected. Any tampering with them would eliminate one of the most vital incentives to human activity and would jeopardize future endeavor". Hitler clearly believed that the lack of a precise economic programme was one of the Nazi Party's strengths, saying: "The basic feature of our economic theory is that we have no theory at all".

Hitler's political beliefs drew heavily upon social Darwinism—the view that natural selection applies as much to human society as it does to biological organisms. Hitler believed that history was shaped by a violent struggle between nations and races; and that a nation needed to be united under a strong, centralized state led by an heroic leader in order to succeed in this struggle and that individuals within a nation battled with each other for survival; and that such ruthless competition was good for the health of the nation because it promoted "superior individuals" to higher positions in society.

=== Pre-war economy (1933–1939) ===
Before World War II, the Nazis placed non-Nazi Party professionals in charge of economic policy. Hitler appointed Hjalmar Schacht, a former member of the German Democratic Party, as Chairman of the Reichsbank in 1933 and minister of economics in 1934. At first, Schacht continued the economic policies introduced by the government of Kurt von Schleicher in 1932 to combat the effects of the Great Depression in Germany. These policies were mostly Keynesian, relying on large public works programs supported by deficit spending—such as the construction of the Autobahn—to stimulate the economy and reduce unemployment (which stood at 30% in early 1933). There was a major reduction in unemployment over the following years, while price controls prevented the recurrence of inflation.

After his rise to power, Hitler took a pragmatic position on economics, accepting private property and allowing capitalist private enterprises to exist so long as they adhered to the goals of the Nazi state, but not tolerating enterprises that he saw as being opposed to the national interest.

The Nazis outlawed independent trade unions and banned strikes, creating the German Labour Front (DAF), which became one of the largest organizations in Germany, comprising over 35,000,000 full-time employees by 1939. They also directed Schacht to place more emphasis on military production and rearmament. After the Nazi takeover in 1933, Germany slowly began to recover from the Great Depression. Several economists, such as Michał Kalecki, have seen the German recovery as an example of military Keynesianism. However, others have noted that the bulk of the German military buildup occurred after 1936 when the economic recovery was well underway.

In the 1930s, Nazi Germany transferred many companies and services from state ownership into the private sector, while other Western capitalist countries were moving in the opposite direction and strove for increased state ownership of industry. In most cases, this was a return to the private sector of firms which had been taken into state ownership by the democratic government of the Weimar Republic as a result of the Great Depression. The firms returned to private ownership by the Nazi government "belonged to a wide range of sectors: steel, mining, banking, local public utilities, shipyards, ship-lines, railways, etc." and in addition some public services began to be provided by semi-private entities that were connected to the Nazi Party rather than the German state. There were two primary reasons for the Nazi privatization policy. First, especially in the early years of the Nazi regime, it was used as a way to build good relations between the government and business interests. Second, the Nazi government greatly increased public expenditure, especially on military re-armament and infrastructure projects. Existing sources of revenue were not sufficient to cover the new expenses, so the government was forced to sell assets in order to gain funds.

In June 1933, the Reinhardt Program was introduced. It was an extensive infrastructure development project that combined indirect incentives, such as tax reductions, with direct public investment in waterways, railroads and highways. The Reinhardt Program was followed by other similar initiatives, with the result that between 1933 and 1936 the German construction industry was greatly expanded. In 1933, only 666,000 Germans worked in construction and by 1936 the number had increased to 2,000,000. In particular, road construction was expanding at a very rapid pace. This was part of Hitler's war preparations as Germany needed a state-of-the-art highway system in order to be able to move troops and materials quickly. As a side effect, cars and other forms of motorized transport became increasingly attractive to the population, therefore the German car industry also experienced a boom in the 1930s.

While the ideology of the Nazi Party was founded on the principle of inequality between races and advocated a war of racial conquest, it also promised social welfare and other benefits for racially pure, able-bodied Germans who supported its aims. As such, the Nazi German government established an agency called the Nationalsozialistische Volkswohlfahrt (NSV, National Socialist People's Welfare) to achieve its goal of racially directed social welfare. Hitler instructed NSV chairman Erich Hilgenfeldt to "see to the disbanding of all private welfare institutions", in an effort to direct who was to receive social benefits. Under this selective welfare structure, Nazi administrators were able to mount an effort towards the "cleansing of their cities of 'asocials'", who were deemed unworthy of receiving assistance for various reasons. Underlining the importance of nationality and race, Joseph Goebbels, the Nazi propaganda minister, claimed in 1944: "We and we alone [the Nazis] have the best social welfare measures. Everything is done for the nation".

In 1936, military spending in Germany exceeded 10% of GNP (higher than any other European country at the time). Military investment also exceeded civilian investment from 1936 onwards. Armaments dominated government expenditures on goods and services. That year also represented a turning point for German trade policy as world prices for raw materials (which constituted the bulk of German imports) were on the rise. At the same time, world prices for manufactured goods (Germany's chief exports) were falling. The result was that Germany found it increasingly difficult to maintain a balance of payments. A large trade deficit seemed almost inevitable, but Hitler found this prospect unacceptable. Thus Germany, following Italy's lead, began to move away from partially free trade in the direction of economic self-sufficiency.

Unlike Italy, Germany did not strive to achieve full autarky, even though in May 1933 Hitler's regime had defaulted unilaterally on Germany's foreign debt along with a decree for sweeping capital controls that made it difficult to engage in foreign trade. Hitler was aware of the fact that Germany lacked reserves of raw materials and full autarky was therefore impossible, thus he chose a different approach. The Nazi government tried to limit the number of its trade partners and—when possible—only trade with countries within the German sphere of influence. A number of bilateral trade agreements were signed between Germany and other European countries (mostly countries located in Southern and South-Eastern Europe) during the 1930s. The German government strongly encouraged trade with these countries but strongly discouraged trade with any others.

By the late 1930s, the aims of German trade policy were to use economic and political power to make the countries of Southern Europe and the Balkans dependent on Germany. The German economy would draw its raw materials from that region and the countries in question would receive German manufactured goods in exchange. Already in 1938, Yugoslavia, Hungary, Romania, Bulgaria and Greece transacted 50% of all their foreign trade with Germany. Throughout the 1930s, German businesses were encouraged to form cartels, monopolies and oligopolies, whose interests were then protected by the state. In his book, Big Business in the Third Reich, Arthur Schweitzer states:

Monopolistic price fixing became the rule in most industries, and cartels were no longer confined to the heavy or large-scale industries. ... Cartels and quasi-cartels (whether of big business or small) set prices, engaged in limiting production, and agreed to divide markets and classify consumers in order to realize a monopoly profit.

In the same book, Schweitzer details the triangular power structure that existed between the Nazi Party, big business and the generals in 1936. Within a few years of Hitler's accession, "middle-class socialism" had been defeated, collective bargaining had been banned and unions had been outlawed—large companies were favored over small businesses. Shortly after Hitler became chancellor, Germany refused to pay its reparation payments as was mandated in the Versailles Treaty. It also diverted large sums of money to rearmament, which violated that treaty. This had the support of the generals and the business community since their profits were guaranteed on these orders. Big business developed an increasingly close partnership with the Nazi government as it became increasingly organized.

Under Hjalmar Schacht, a policy was introduced whereby certain nations who traded with Germany (such as the United States) had to deal with special banks. Foreign currency was deposited in these institutions and Americans were paid for their goods (especially raw materials) in scrips that could only be redeemed for German goods in kind. These scrips soon declined in value as they were not truly fungible and many were used by travellers to Germany in the mid-1930s. Schacht was able to build up foreign currency reserves for later use.

=== Wartime policies (1939–1945) ===
Initially, the outbreak of World War II did not bring about any large changes in the German economy. Germany had spent six years preparing for war and a large portion of the economy was already devoted to military production. Unlike most other governments, the Nazis did not increase direct taxes by any significant amount in order to fund the war. The top income tax rate in 1941 was 13.7% in Germany as opposed to 23.7% in Great Britain.

During the war, as Germany acquired new territories (either by direct annexation or by installing puppet governments in defeated countries), these new territories were forced to sell raw materials and agricultural products to German buyers at extremely low prices. Hitler's policy of Lebensraum ("living space") strongly emphasized the conquest of new lands in the East and the exploitation of these lands to provide cheap goods to Germany. However, in practice the intensity of the fighting on the Eastern Front and the Soviet scorched earth policy meant that the Germans found little they could use. On the other hand, a large quantity of goods flowed into Germany from conquered lands in the West. For example, two-thirds of all French trains in 1941 were used to carry goods to Germany. Norway lost 20% of its national income in 1940 and 40% in 1943.

From 1939 to 1941, when the Molotov–Ribbentrop Pact was in effect, there was trade between Nazi Germany and the Soviet Union. The Soviet Union provided raw materials and Germany provided finished industrial goods. In the first year, Nazi Germany received "one million tons of cereals, half a million tons of wheat, 900,000 tons of oil, 100,000 tons of cotton, 500,000 tons of phosphates" and at least one million tons of soybeans. Some of the Nazi–Soviet trade included machine tools for manufacturing munitions, the cruiser Luetzow, "plans of the Bismarck, heavy naval guns and other gear and some thirty of Germany's latest warplanes, including the Messerschmitt fighters 109 and 110 and the Ju 88 dive bombers". In addition, the Soviets received diesel engines, generators, turbines, locomotives and "samples of German artillery, tanks, explosives, chemical-warfare equipment". This trade ended abruptly in June 1941, when Germany invaded the Soviet Union.

Even before the war, Nazi Germany maintained a supply of slave labour. This practice started from the early days of labour camps of "undesirables" (German: unzuverlässige Elemente), such as the homeless, homosexual and criminals as well as political dissidents, communists, Jews and anyone that the regime wanted out of the way. As the war progressed, the use of slave labour experienced massive growth. Prisoners of war and civilian "undesirables" were brought in from occupied territories. Hundreds of thousands of Poles, Jews, Slavs and other conquered peoples were used as slave labourers by German corporations such as Thyssen, Krupp, IG Farben and even Fordwerke—a subsidiary of the Ford Motor Company. By 1944, slave labour made up one quarter of Germany's entire work force and the majority of German factories had a contingent of prisoners. The Nazis also had plans for the deportation and enslavement of Britain's adult male population in the event of a successful invasion.

The proportion of military spending in the German economy began growing rapidly after 1942 as the Nazi government was forced to dedicate more and more of the country's economic resources to fighting a losing war, therefore civilian factories were converted to military use and placed under military administration. By late 1944, almost the entire German economy was dedicated to military production. At the same time, Allied bombings were destroying German factories and cities at a rapid pace, leading to the final collapse of the German war economy in 1945.

== Economy of Francoist Spain ==
Francisco Franco, dictator of Spain from the Spanish Civil War in the 1930s until his death in 1975, based his economic policies on the theories of national syndicalism as expounded by the Falange (Spanish for "phalanx"), the Spanish fascist party founded in 1933 by José Antonio Primo de Rivera which was one of Franco's chief supporters during his bid for power.

=== Corporatism ===
During and after the Spanish Civil War, Franco and the Falange created a corporative system based on the Italian model. An economic system was implemented according to the wishes of the corporations, which also set prices and wages. Combined with autarky and in the absence of Marshall Plan aid after World War II, Spain's post-war economic growth stagnated. The Spanish corporative system was less successful than the Italian experience. At one point, the Spanish farmers' corporation created a massive bread shortage by setting the price too low. As a result, bread production was abandoned in favour of other, more profitable goods. Although the policy aimed to make bread accessible to the poorest among the population, the opposite occurred and a black market emerged.

As in Italy, wages were set by the state in negotiations between officially recognized workers' syndicates and employers' organizations, with the state as mediator. During the Second Spanish Republic, workers' groups had aligned with the anarchists, communists or other Republican forces. However, Franco's regime tended to favour the interests of large capitalist businesses despite its proclaimed syndicalist rhetoric. In response, workers (often anarchists) created illegal syndicates and organized strikes, which usually were repressed brutally by Franco's police state.

=== Economic liberalization ===
In 1954, Franco abandoned the corporative system in favour of free market reforms implemented by economic technocrats. Many of these technocrats were members of Opus Dei, a Roman Catholic lay group to which Franco had given powerful positions within the Ministry of Finance and Economics. The reforms of the 1950s were a huge success and Spain experienced a period of rapid economic growth known as the "Spanish Miracle", continuing until Franco's death in 1975. During this period, tourism became an important part of the Spanish economy. Although the corporatist organs and rhetoric from the earlier years of the Franco regime were maintained, they now played a secondary role. Spain's economy was further liberalized by the Spanish transition to democracy following Franco's death.

=== Family finances and permiso marital ===
During Franco's rule, Spanish law discriminated strongly against married women. Without her husband's approval, referred to as the permiso marital, a wife was prohibited from almost all economic activities, including employment, ownership of property or even travel away from home. The law also provided for less stringent definitions of such crimes as adultery and desertion for husbands than it did for wives. Significant reforms of this system began shortly before Franco's death and continued at a rapid pace over the following years. The permiso marital was abolished in 1975, laws against adultery were cancelled in 1978 and divorce was legalized in 1981. During the same year, the parts of the civil code that dealt with family finances were also reformed.

== See also ==
- Anti-capitalism
- Anti-communism
- Autarky
- Class collaboration
- Corporatism
- Dirigisme
- Economic nationalism
- Fascism
- Fascism and ideology
- Fascist syndicalism
- Hamiltonian economic program
- Mercantilism
- Militarism
- Military–industrial complex
- Mixed economy
- National syndicalism
- Productionism
- Protectionism
- Socialist market economy
- State capitalism
- Statism
- War economy
