= Fascist syndicalism =

Italian trade syndicate movement

Fascist syndicalism was an Italian trade syndicate movement (syndicat means trade union in French) that rose out of the pre-World War II provenance of the revolutionary syndicalist movement led mostly by Edmondo Rossoni, Sergio Panunzio, Angelo Oliviero Olivetti, Michele Bianchi, Alceste De Ambris, Paolo Orano, Massimo Rocca, and Guido Pighetti, under the influence of Georges Sorel, who was considered the "'metaphysician' of syndicalism".

The fascist syndicalists differed from other forms of fascism in that they generally favored class struggle, worker-controlled factories and hostility to industrialists, which lead historians to portray them as "leftist fascist idealists" who "differed radically from right fascists." Generally considered one of the more radical fascist syndicalists in Italy, Rossoni was the "leading exponent of fascist syndicalism", and sought to infuse nationalism with "class struggle". It is related to national syndicalism.

== Revolutionary syndicalism to national syndicalism ==
Sometimes considered the "father" of revolutionary syndicalism or at least "the leading figure amongst the French Syndicalists", Georges Sorel supported militant trade unionism to combat the corrupting influences of parliamentary parties and politics, even if the legislators were distinctly socialist. As a French Marxist who supported Lenin, Bolshevism and Mussolini concurrently in the early 1920s, Sorel promoted the cause of the proletariat in class struggle, and the "catastrophic polarization" that would arise through social myth-making of general strikes. The intention of syndicalism was to organize strikes to abolish capitalism; not to supplant it with state socialism, but rather to build a society of worker-class producers. This Sorel regarded as "truly true" Marxism.

In his 1908 book, Reflections on Violence, Sorel provided the justification for syndicats as an effort to organize workers in violent uprisings, to convince workers not to be ashamed of acts of violence, and that they should be scornful of "politics, the Republic and patriotism". In this Sorelian sense, the violence associated with Marxist class struggle, could be interpreted as fine, heroic and in the service of the "immemorial interest of civilization". Many European socialists joined the ranks of the revolutionary syndicalists, including Benito Mussolini, who claimed that he had succumbed to revolutionary syndicalism by 1904, citing that it occurred during a general strike, although he had been involved with syndicalism earlier.

By 1909, Sorel became disappointed over the compromising policies of socialist parliamentarians, the movement towards democratic socialism and the decadence of the proletariat who were seduced by the "mirage of enormous economic benefits". In Sorel's opinion, the proletariat was neither responding to his expectations of revolutionary change nor the dreams of Marx's "magnificent epic". This reassessment of Marxism led Sorel to adopt Benedetto Croce's aphorism that "Socialism is dead." During this period, many of Sorel's criticisms and writings about socialism were in response to the profound "crisis of Marxism", where he, according to Antonio Labriola, expounds on it with gusto and converted this "crisis into one of socialism."

To Sorel, the integrity and intellectualism of Marxism was decomposing, and the "heroic proletariat" appeared to have been either non-existent or shown to be as "much corrupted by utilitarianism as the bourgeoisie." According to Sorel, the power of democratic-republican governments was debasing the revolutionary initiative of the worker class which forced him to search for other alternatives, including a nationalism, but one devoid of any monarchism. In order to resolve this crisis of socialism, Sorel turned toward an anti-democratic socialism that encompasses a radical nationalism, while still holding to his support of worker-owned factories, but under a heretic Marxism divested of its "materialistic and rationalistic essence".

In 1909, Sorel published an article in Enrico Leone's Il Divenire sociale, an influential journal of revolutionary syndicalism in Italy, which was later reprinted and championed by Charles Maurras in the L'Action française entitled "Antiparliamentary Socialist". Sorel was not the first to drift towards nationalism and syndicalism. During the years of 1902 to 1910 a cadre of Italian revolutionary syndicalists had embarked on a mission to combine Italian nationalism with syndicalism. They were later to become "founders of the Fascist movement", and "held key posts" in Mussolini's regime. Generally, Italian syndicalism finally coalesced into national syndicalism during World War I and the months following the 1918 armistice.

Maurras welcomed Sorel's support in that they both were concerned over French socialism reaching the path of no return in its rush towards "democratization", coalescing into a formidable Social Democracy movement. To Maurras, the purity of socialism had to abstain from being captured by seduction of democracy, declaring that "socialism liberated from the democratic and cosmopolitan element fits nationalism well as a well made glove fits a beautiful hand." But such thoughts were not unusual for many European socialists during this period, such as Philippe Buchez and Ferdinand Lassalle who "despised democracy and exalted the nation." Due to his aversion to democracy, Sorel and the syndicalists rejected political parties and democratic institutions as well as the "Marxist dictatorship of the proletariat", but remained dutiful to Karl Marx's opposition to democracy and elections. Earlier, Marx had confessed that his revolutionary activities in the Revolution of 1848 was "nothing but a plan of war against democracy."

In an attempt to save Marxism, Sorel gravitated towards the creation of a synthesis of populism and nationalism that also included "the crudest of anti-Semitism". By this time, Sorel and other syndicalists concluded that proletarian violence was ineffectual since the "proletariat was incapable of fulfilling its revolutionary role," an assessment that persuaded many to see the nation-state as the best means by which to establish a proletarian-based society, which later congealed into the fascist concept of proletarian nationalism.

Many revolutionary syndicalists followed Sorel and his Sorelian socialism towards the allure of a radical nationalism after he praised Maurras and displayed his sympathies for French integral nationalism in 1909. The appeal that Charles Maurras presented was his nationalistic approach against bourgeois democracy, the Enlightenment, and "its liberalism, its individualism, and its conception of society as an aggregate of individuals." This trend continued and by 1911, revolutionary syndicalists had acknowledged that two important antirational political currents had come together, forging "a new nationalism and revolutionary socialism." This coalescence finally surfaced as a major facet of Italian Fascism, where Mussolini himself confessed: "What I am, I owe to Sorel." The Israeli historian Zeev Sternhell, considered a leading expert on fascism, asserted that this integration of syndicalism with unpatriotic nationalism was a factor in why "Italian revolutionary syndicalism became the backbone of fascist ideology."

== Fascist syndicalism and productivism ==
Mussolini was one of the first to comingle the phrase fascism with syndicalism, remarking in the early 1920s that "Fascist syndicalism is national and productivistic... in a national society in which labor becomes a joy, an object of pride and a title to nobility." Most Italian syndicalists viewed social revolution as a means for rapid transformation to provide "superior productivity", and if this economic abundance failed to occur, there could be no meaningful social change. The emphasis by syndicalists towards the importance of "producerism" had been originally initiated by Sorel in 1907, who argued that "Marx considers that a revolution by a proletariat of producers who [have] acquired economic capacity." When Carlo Cafiero developed a compendium for the initial volume of Capital in Italian, Marx reminded his colleague that "material conditions necessary for the emancipation of the proletariat" must be "spontaneously generated by the development of capitalism (den Gang der kapitalistischen Produktion)."

The support for the theory of producerism expanded among Fascist syndicalists after the conclusion of the Russian Civil War and transition from war communism showed high unemployment and an environment where "most of the mills and factories were at a standstill; mines and collieries were wrecked and flooded."

After the introduction of the New Economic Policy (NEP), Italian syndicalists continued to move further away from orthodox Marxism, determined to revise it to fit the changing times and to embolden its strategic goals. They argued that the Russian Bolsheviks had failed to adhere to Engels' 1850 admonition about the dangers of trying to establish a social revolution within an economically backwards environment. This drift had emerged years before the economic malaise of Soviet Russia, prompting most Italian syndicalists to transcend the errors and drawbacks that "they believed they found in orthodox Marxism." Developed to bring about worker control of the means of production by direct action, the intellectuals of syndicalism came to the realization that Italy's primitive economy could facilitate neither equality nor abundance for society. Without a mature industry developed by the bourgeois, they came to understand that a successful social revolution required the support of "classless" revolutionaries. Mussolini, along with Italian syndicalists, Nationalists and Futurists, contended that those revolutionaries would be Fascists, not Marxists or some other ideology. According to Mussolini and other syndicalist theoreticians, Fascism would be "the socialism of 'proletarian nations.'"

Fascist syndicalists also became preoccupied with the idea of increasing production instead of simply establishing a redistributive economic structure. Sergio Panunzio, a major theoretician of Italian Fascism and syndicalism, believed that Syndicalists were producerists, rather than distributionists. In his criticism of the Bolsheviks' handling of their economy, Panunzio also asserted that Russian Soviet state had become a "dictatorship over the proletariat, and not of the proletariat."

== Rossoni and fascist syndicalists ==
When Rossoni was selected as the secretary-general of the General Confederation of Fascist Syndical Corporations in December 1922, other Italian syndicalists began to affirm the "Fascist syndicalism" catchphrase in their aim at "building and reorganizing political structures... through a synthesis of State and labor." Rossoni and his Fascist syndicalist cadre were soon regarded as "radical or leftist elements", who sought to protect the economic interests of "workers and to preserve their class consciousness." Rossoni strove to build a "collective interest in the economy", that would subject employers to Fascist discipline while providing a more substantial role for workers to make economic decisions.

In an effort to set the basic revolutionary direction of the Fascist state, Rossoni argued that Fascist syndicalism should be at the forefront, proclaiming in Mussolini's Il Popolo d'Italia newspaper that "only the Fascist syndicates could complete the revolution." In his early anti-capitalist polemics, Rossoni claimed that capitalism "depressed and annulled production rather than stimulating and developing it" and that industrialists were "apathetic, passive, and ignorant."

By early 1923 industrialists and factory owners were becoming alarmed by the Fascist syndicalists' verbal assaults on the business community and capitalism, provoking a number of them to wonder if it was "now wise to pay the Communists to fight the Fascists!" As the unrelenting attack continued, Rossoni by 1926 was steadfast in his accusations that depicted industrialists as "vampires" and "profiteers". Rossoni not only targeted big industrialists for their collective avarice, but also focused his criticisms against the "offensive greed of small shop-keepers".

In some cases, Rossoni's pro-labor stances worried industrialists due to his philosophic interpretation of Marx's "dynamic law of history", which lead him to support the eventuality of workers' control of factories. He argued that industrialists had a legitimate right to assume their positions, but only until "such time as workers, organized into new syndicates, had mastered the requisite competence to take command." The Fascist syndicalists' hostility towards employers caused political troubles for Mussolini's regime before and after he established a one-party dictatorship in early 1925. But despite the controversies, Rossoni held on to his position until he was forced to resign in 1928, probably due to fears over his almost 3 million-strong union membership that had greatly surpassed the National Fascist Party membership. Nonetheless, Rossoni was treated as a valuable leader in Mussolini's administration, becoming a member of the Grand Council of Fascism from 1930 to 1943 and other high positions.

Although independent labor unions in Italy were not nationalized until April 3, 1926, under Alfredo Rocco's Syndical Laws, Fascist syndicates by 1922 had become a "major recruitment competitor for the socialist and Catholic worker organizations." After peaking to a membership of over 2,000,000 members by 1920, the independent General Confederation of Labor was reduced to 400,000 members by mid-1922. Other unions fared just as poorly. The Catholic syndicates of the Popolari had 1.2 million members in 1921, but by the later part of 1922, it was down to 540,000.

Much of the increased membership in Fascist syndicates stemmed from the deteriorating economic conditions that occurred during the long factory strikes in the early 1920s that had been spearheaded by revolutionary socialists. The occupied factories suffered financial problems, a shortage of cash to pay wages, and a slump in productivity levels." When factory workers started to abandon factories, "red guards" were employed to keep workers at their work stations, in some cases forcing workers to "work under threat of violence." What also contributed to the success of the Fascist union organizations was their strong affiliation to the Fascist party, a policy that was not taken up by the Italian Socialist Party and other labor confederations.

There were a number of variants of Fascist syndicalism, ranging from the more moderate to the radical. One of the more radical fascist syndicalist was the philosopher Ugo Spirito. Considered as a "left fascist", Spirito supported the struggle for a populist type of "corporativism", a sort of proprietary corporation that provided the features of "collective ownership without undesirable economic centralization."

Besides Rossoni, Sergio Panunzio and A. O. Olivetti were considered the "most coherent" Italian syndicalists who have been classified as the "Fascist left" by historians. They identified Fascism and syndicalist ideology as a replacement for parliamentary liberalism so as to advance the interests of workers and common people as well as "modernize the economy." To Rossoni, corporations were viewed as the best institutions to promote "economic justice and social solidarity" among producers.

Luigi Razzo, who headed a Fascist trade union confederations (agriculture workers), thought that economy organizations represented the most important political element for the Fascist regime because they would provide workers with a "serious role in decision-making—especially in regulating the economy." Through this "fascos corporativism," the true economic nation would have the means to govern itself as economics and politics grew closer towards a convergence. This unification of politics and economics was the "core of the left-fascist conception" for most fascist syndicalists, who upheld fascism as a political idea and principle, but not as an economic system. The Fascist state's duty was to discipline production and economic activities, organized under economic groupings and collective interest, while no longer allowing the economy to operate on its own.

== Mussolini and his fascist regime ==
Mussolini had been responsive to Rossoni in his effort to stop cuts in real wages, maintain the 40-hour week, and create a new "Charter of Labor" that would complete the Fascist labor legislation to guarantee the rights of workers, which resulted in vague gains for labor. But Mussolini had been more forceful in similar pro-labor approaches in the past. In the 1919 Unione Italiana del Lavoro (UIL) strike at the Franchi e Gregorini metallurgical plant in Dalmine, he supported workers' occupation of factories. Calling them "creative strikes", Mussolini insisted that workers "have a right to 'parity'" with factory owners, and to engage in strikes to achieve it. His main caveat was that the strike should not interrupt production, and that workers show both a willingness to participate as equals in the production process and the competence to discharge obligations in pursuit of the strike.

Despite the official policy of Mussolini to uphold class collaboration, the "left corporativists" in Italy continued to see class differences as inevitable, believing class-based organizations essential if corporations were to genuinely involve workers. Mussolini had decided to move in another direction, concluding by late 1917 that orthodox Marxism was largely irrelevant for revolutionaries in industrially backward nations. Mussolini and Fascist intellectuals reasoned that if the bourgeoisie could not fulfill their historical obligations and advance a nation's industry infrastructure, then the task had to be relegated to the popular masses and elite vanguard, which would require a commitment to class collaboration so as to serve the community's productive potential through proletariat and bourgeoisie producers. Mussolini described this collaboration between classes as a new democracy—"a sane and honest regime of productive classes." Mussolini's opposition to class struggle echoed an earlier sentiment of Marxist reformers and Social Democrats, including Eduard Bernstein, who maintained that "socialists needed to stress cooperation and evolution rather than class conflict and revolution."

Some contend that "Mussolini's far-left syndicalism" had merged with the far-right nationalism of Gabriel D'Annunzio, birthing a new revision of fascism by 1922. Others assert that up to late 1921, Mussolini still preferred to rename the Italian Fasces to "Fascist Labor Party" in an effort to retain his reputation as being loyal to the left-wing tradition of supporting trade unionism, especially if he and his fascist leaders could win the support of the General Confederation of Labor (CGL). Mussolini abandoned his proposed labor coalition with the socialists at the Third Fascist Congress (Nov. 7–10, 1921) in a conciliatory manner to appease the violent squadristi militias who strove to curtail the power of revolutionary socialists and labor unions. Nonetheless, by 1934, Mussolini began to reverse many of his market-maturity positions and boasted that he had put three-fourths of the Italian economy in the "hands of the state".

The leading banks, which had lent heavily to industry, had to be rescued in the early 1930s, as did many large industrial companies. Two new state-run holding companies, the Italian Industrial Finance Institute (Istituto Mobiliare Italiano; IMI) and the Institute for Industrial Reconstruction (Istituto per la Ricostruzione Industriale; IRI), were set up to bail out failing firms and to provide capital for new industrial investment; they also provided trained managers and effective financial supervision. Italy thus acquired a huge, state-led industrial sector, which was especially important in banking, steel, shipping, armaments, and the supply of hydroelectricity. However, these firms were not nationalized. Instead, they operated in the market as private companies and still had many private shareholders.

After he was confined in Northern Italy as a puppet government for the Nazis in 1943, Mussolini promoted "socialization", under the Italian Social Republic. In early 1944, Mussolini's "socialization law" called for nationalization of industry that would pursue a policy where "workers were to participate in factory and business management."

== See also ==
- Fascist manifesto
- National syndicalism
- Sansepolcrismo
- Revolutionary nationalism
- Proletarian nation
- Proprietary Corporation
- Third Position
- Strasserism
- Falangism
- Spanish Syndical Organization
- National Trade Union Confederation of Finland
