= Liberal corporatism =

Application of corporatism

Liberal corporatism is an economic-democratic and liberal-socialist application of corporatism, which seeks workers' election of management and minimal state intervention in sector bargaining over economic policy. However, some forms of liberal corporatism exhibit non-socialist and nationalist-liberal characteristics. 'Liberal corporatism' is often in conflict with 'liberal pluralism', which opposes granting power to organised interest groups.

English liberal socialist philosopher John Stuart Mill supported corporatism as needing to predominate in society to create equality for labourers and give them a voice in management through democratic economic rights. Unlike a number of other forms of corporatism, liberal corporatism does not reject markets or individualism, but rather believes that a business is a social institution that requires a recognition of the needs of its members. This liberal corporatist ethic was similar to Taylorism but called for democratisation of the firm and election of management.

Liberal corporatism was an influential component of the progressivism in the United States that has been referred to as "interest group liberalism". Labour leaders' and progressives' advocacy of liberal corporatism is believed to have been influenced in reaction to the rise of syndicalism and particularly anarcho-syndicalism at the time in Europe. Liberal corporatism is commonly supported by proponents in Austria, the Netherlands, Denmark, Finland, Norway, and Sweden.

== See also ==
- Corporatism
  - Social corporatism
- Economic democracy
  - Codetermination
  - Sectoral bargaining
  - Worker cooperative
  - Workplace democracy
- German State Party, a national-liberal and corporatist political party in the Weimar Republic
- Liberal socialism
- Market socialism
- Welfare capitalism
- Political particularism – Ability of policymakers to further their careers by catering to narrow interests
