= Ugo Spirito =

Italian philosopher (1896–1979)

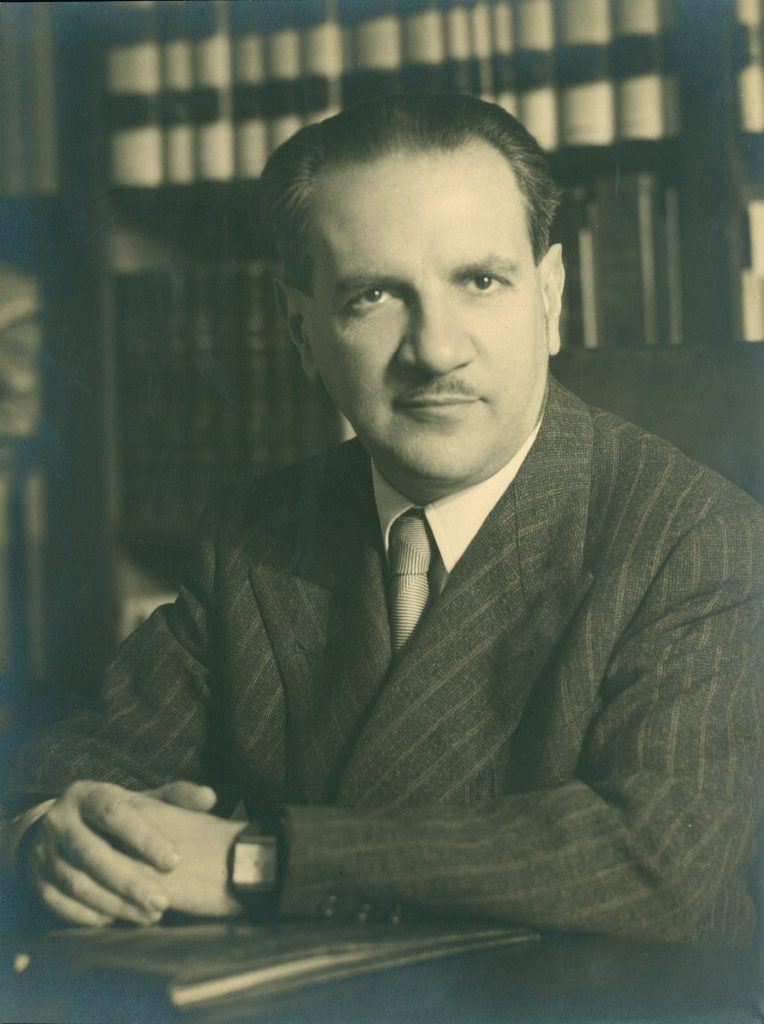
- Born: 9 September 1896; Arezzo, Kingdom of Italy
- Died: 28 April 1979 (aged 82); Rome, Italy
- Resting place: Campo Verano

Education
- Education: Sapienza University of Rome

Philosophical work
- Era: 20th-century philosophy
- Region: Western philosophy
- School: Neo-Hegelianism
- Notable ideas: Proprietary Corporation

Ugo Spirito (September 9, 1896 – April 28, 1979) was an Italian philosopher, economist, and political scientist.

A student of the philosopher Giovanni Gentile, he is one of the main theorists of corporatism. At first a fascist political philosopher and idealist thinker, he moved towards Soviet communism and Maoism in the post-World War II era.

== Early life ==
Spirito was born on 9 September 1896, in Arezzo. Spirito undertook academic study in law and philosophy. He was initially an advocate of positivism. In 1918, whilst attending Sapienza University of Rome, he abandoned his position to become a follower of the actual idealism of Giovanni Gentile. By the age of 22, he was a self-proclaimed fascist and actualist.

== Fascism ==
Spirito's particular interest in fascism was corporatism and he came to discuss the subject in depth through the journal Nuovi Studi di Diritto, Economica e Politica. He wrote extensively on his favoured topic of integral corporatism, a system where ownership would be concentrated in the hands of workers rather than shareholders. This belief in integral corporatism was sometimes equated with a commitment to common ownership, and he represented the left wing of fascism by supporting corporatism as a means of mass nationalisation and was the butt of criticism from other fascists who accused him of Bolshevism. Spirito's economically left-wing ideals did not come to fruition in Fascist Italy and in the later years of fascism fell out of favour with Benito Mussolini. In 1942, he even attempted to publish a book of his theories (Revolutionary War) but permission was denied by Mussolini.

== Academic career ==
Outside of his involvement in fascist politics, Spirito held professorships at the University of Pisa, University of Messina, University of Genoa, and at Rome itself. Initially, his academic attention was taken up with economics and criminal law, but, later in his career, he became more interested in philosophical questions. In terms of publications, he served as editor of the Giornale Critico della Filosofia Italiana and the Enciclopedia Italiana, and as joint director of the Nuovi Studi di Diritto, Economica e Politica.
