= Proprietary Corporation =

Fascist Corporatist economic project

The proprietary corporation (Italian: Corporazione proprietaria) is a concept proposed during Italian fascism by fascist political philosopher Ugo Spirito, in which a corporation, akin to a guild, assumes ownership of a company in which its members operate. This was proposed as a class-collaborative means to end the dualism between capital and labor via the transfer of the means of production to the corporation.

== Definition ==
The Proprietary Corporation was born from an idea of Ugo Spirito, expressed for the first time during the II Convention on syndical and corporate studies, held in Ferrara in May 1932.

"Fascism and corporatism I saw with the faith of a revolutionary oriented towards a conception of a communist character which had its culminating point in the proposal of the proprietary corporation at the congress of Ferrara in 1932. From Bottai I expected an explicit collaboration in this direction, albeit within the limits of an extremely difficult political situation, dominated not only by the two capitalist forces but above all by liberal and conservative culture, by Croce and Einaudi."

— Ugo Spirito, Memorie di un incosciente p. 190, Rusconi, Milan, 1977

A proprietary corporation, therefore, means the product of the transformation of a limited company into a corporation, passing from the legal status of a private company to that of an institution of public law, to force the capital to exit the decision-making circuit to be relegated to the passive and external one of the simple participation in profit.

This transformation would lead to two consequences:

- The transfer of control of the capital from the shareholders, a taxable person in terms of productivity and work, to the workers of the company
- The transfer of the means of production, and therefore of the ownership of the company itself, to the corporation.

In this perspective, there is a transformation of the worker into an authentic protagonist of the company in which, with equal rights, all those who carry out a productive activity are members and, in the words of Spirito himself, the capital passes from shareholders to workers who become:

"Owners of the guild for the part due to them in accordance with the particular hierarchical ranks."

— Ugo Spirito, Capitalismo e corporativismo, 1934.

The proposal thus fell on the one hand in the continuation of the fascist conception of class collaboration (as opposed to the Marxist class struggle and capitalist liberalism), eliminating the distinction between employer and employee; on the other, in the publicistic push of the property, according to the principles of the Gentilian ethical state, envisaging progressive exhaustion of private property in the public exercise of the company. This last conception was inherent in the Gentilian conception of the relationship between the individual and the state, sharing the same entity, as the corporate state organizes and disciplines the entire life of society within it.

Furthermore, the Proprietary Corporation is part of the ideological conception of fascism in the labor and economic sphere by referring to Article VII of the Labor Charter:

(...)the organization of the company is responsible for the direction of production before the State (...) it is also right that the technicians, employees, workers, who are called to carry out a given project, are considered with active and intelligent collaborators, and that a reciprocal sum of duties and rights derives from this.

— Arnaldo Mussolini, Commento alla Carta del Lavoro Istituto Editoriale Scientifico, Milano, 1928.

(...) the logical solution appears to be that of the 'proprietary corporation' and the corporations that share the corporation. It is a solution that, at least on paper, resolves the antinomies (...) it unites capital and labor, eliminates the dualistic system, merges the company with the corporation, and finally allows an effective identification of individual economic life with that of the state.

— Ugo Spirito, Individuo e Stato nell'economia corporativa, relazione al II Convegno di Studi sindacali e corporativi, Ferrara, maggio 1932

With the proprietary corporation, Spirito intended to create one of the tools capable of opposing and winning the struggle against Marxism and Capitalism, giving rise to a "Nation of producers" that disciplines itself through the system of corporations, which made the individual interest coincide with the national and community one thanks to the belonging of all the workers themselves to the company bodies.

== Reactions ==
The concept garnered support from Mussolini himself, who embraced it with enthusiasm and endorsement, asserting that "it overcomes the opposing positions of liberal and socialist economics". Within the Fascist left, however, there emerged two camps. There were proponents who supported Spiritos' concept, viewing it as a coherent extension of fascist class collaborationism and perceived class collaboration as a means beneficial to the nation's interests. In contrast, the other faction held reservations, grounded in the belief that class struggle, rather than collaborationism, served as a conduit for advancing national interests. This contingent also posited that the concept effectively nullified the essence of syndicalism within the broader framework of corporatism.

== Implementation ==
After the establishment of the Italian Social Republic and the publication of the Verona Manifesto, elements of the proprietary corporation were put into practice through the enactment of a decree on socialization (Legislative Decree 12 February 1944, n. 375). This decree, endorsed and signed by Benito Mussolini and several Fascist hierarchs, established a comprehensive legal and regulatory framework aimed at socialization of management. Under its provisions, management boards were instituted, composed of managers, technicians, and workers.

Central to this approach was the participation of the state and corporations in the management and strategic planning of large and medium-sized companies. The intention was to transcend traditional divisions between labor and management and to promote a harmonious collaboration among these stakeholders.

However, the implementation of these measures was hampered by circumstances of the war and German occupation. The realization of the proprietary corporation concept remained severely limited, preventing the full exploration of its potential impacts on economic structure and worker participation.

== See also ==
- Italian Social Republic
- Economy of fascist Italy
- Fascist syndicalism
- National syndicalism
- Corporatism
- Co-determination
- Industrial democracy
