= Social corporatism =

Economic corporatism based upon a partnership between capital and labour

Social corporatism, occasionally referred to as social democratic corporatism or liberal corporatism, is a form of economic tripartite corporatism based upon a social partnership between the interests of capital and labour, involving collective bargaining between representatives of employers and of labour mediated by the government at the national level. Social corporatism is present to a lesser degree in the Western European social market economies. It is considered a compromise to regulate the conflict between capital and labour by mandating them to engage in mutual consultations that are mediated by the government.

Generally supported by nationalist and/or social-democratic political parties, social corporatism developed in the post-World War II period, influenced by Christian democrats and social democrats in Western European countries such as Austria, Germany, the Netherlands, Denmark, Finland, Norway and Sweden. Social corporatism has also been adopted in different configurations and to varying degrees in various Western European countries.

The Nordic countries have the most comprehensive form of collective bargaining, where trade unions are represented at the national level by official organizations alongside employers' associations. Together with the welfare state policies of these countries, this forms what is termed the Nordic model. Less extensive models exist in Austria and Germany which are components of Rhine capitalism.

== Overview ==
Some controversy has existed in the political left over social corporatism, where it has been criticized for abandoning the concept of class struggle in favour of class collaboration and compromise, legitimizing privately owned enterprise and for lending credence to a form of regulated capitalism. Others on the left counter these criticisms by claiming that social corporatism has been progressive in providing institutional legitimacy to the labour movement that recognizes the existence of ongoing class conflict between the bourgeoisie and the proletariat, but they seek to provide peaceful resolutions to disputes arising from the conflict based on moderation rather than revolution. Proponents of social corporatism consider it a class compromise within the context of existing class conflict.

In the 1930s, social democracy was labeled social fascism by the Communist International which maintained that social democracy was a variant of fascism because, in addition to their shared corporatist economic model, they stood in the way of transitioning to communism and socialism. The development of social corporatism began in Norway and Sweden in the 1930s and was consolidated in the 1960s and 1970s. The system was based upon the dual compromise of capital and the labour as one component and the market and the state as the other component.

Social corporatism developed in Austria under the post-World War II coalition government of the Social Democratic Party of Austria and the Austrian People's Party. Social corporatism in Austria protects private property in exchange for allowing the labour movement to have political recognition and influence in the economy—to avoid the sharp class conflict that plagued Austria in the 1930s.

Social corporatism later expanded to many other Western European and Latin American countries with the spread of the welfare state, social democracy, and industrial unionism, in addition to local movements such as Peronism. J. Barkley Rosser Jr. and Marina V. Rosser wrote on the prevalence of social corporatism in Europe by the late 20th century:

Liberal corporatism (Note: In reference to social corporatism, rather than Mill's liberal corporatism.) is largely self-organized between labor and management, with only a supporting role for government. Leading examples of such systems are found in small, ethnically homogeneous countries with strong traditions of social democratic or labor party rule, such as Sweden's Nordic neighbors. Using a scale of 0.0 to 2.0 and subjectively assigning values based on six previous studies, Frederic Pryor in 1988 found Norway and Sweden the most corporatist at 2.0 each, followed by Austria at 1.8, the Netherlands at 1.5, Finland, Denmark, and Belgium at 1.3 each, and Switzerland and West Germany at 1.0 each.

== See also ==
- Class collaboration
- Industrial unionism
- Liberal corporatism
- Third Way
- Welfare capitalism

== Bibliography ==
- Hicks, Alexander (1988). "Social Democratic Corporatism and Economic Growth". The Journal of Politics. 50 (3). Chicago, Illinois: University of Chicago Press: 677–704. doi:10.2307/2131463. ISSN 0022-3816. JSTOR 2131463. S2CID 154785976.
- Haro, Lea (2011). "Entering a Theoretical Void: The Theory of Social Fascism and Stalinism in the German Communist Party". Critique: Journal of Socialist Theory. 39 (4). Glasgow, Scotland: Glasgow University Press: 563–582. doi:10.1080/03017605.2011.621248. S2CID 146848013.
- Hoppe, Bert (2011). In Stalins Gefolgschaft: Moskau und die KPD 1928–1933 (in German). Munich, Germany: R. Oldenbourg Verlag. ISBN 9783486711738.
- Katzenstein, Peter J. (1987) [1984]. Corporatism and Change: Austria, Switzerland, and the Politics of Industry (1st reprinted ed.). Ithaca, New York: Cornell University Press. ISBN 9780801494673.
- Moschonas, Gerassimos (2002). In the Name of Social Democracy: The Great Transformation, 1945 to the Present. Translated by Elliott, Gregory. London, England: Verso Books. ISBN 978-1-85984-639-1.
- Overy, Richard (2004). The Dictators: Hitler's Germany and Stalin's Russia (illustrated, reprinted ed.). London, England: Allen Lane. ISBN 9780713993097.
- Rosser, J. Barkley; Rosser, Marina V. (2003). Comparative Economics in a Transforming World Economy (2nd ed.). Cambridge, Massachusetts: MIT Press. ISBN 978-0-262-18234-8.
