= Crisis of Marxism =

Crisis of Marxism, also referred to as the crisis in Marxism, was a term first employed in the 1890s after the unexpected revival of global capitalist expansion became evident after the Long Depression that occurred in Europe from 1873 to 1896, which eventually precipitated a crisis in Marxist theory. The crisis resulted in a series of theoretical debates over the significance of economic recovery for the strategy of the socialist movement, leading to ideological fragmentation and increasingly sectarian debates. By the 1890s, orthodox Marxists came to believe that the capitalist mode of production was on the "verge of breakdown", while the socialist movement was on the "verge of revolutionary triumph". Due to a renewed burst of capitalist and industrial activity, such interpretations could no longer be maintained in Western Europe.

The first person to introduce the notion of a crisis amid Marxism has been attributed to Thomas Masaryk, who declared in 1898 that he was observing a "crisis within Marxism". Recognizing a potential problem, Masaryk professed that socialism would be strengthened considerably "if its leaders will frankly criticize its fundamentals to overcome their defects". Contemporaries treat these controversies within the Marxist ranks as a "crisis in Marxism", a "crisis of Marxism", or sometimes designating it as a "revisionist crisis". Considered the father of revisionism, Eduard Bernstein is regarded the main proponent in precipitating one of the greatest crises in the consciousness of the Marxist proletarian movement, and therefore initiating the "revisionist controversy". The October 1898 Stuttgart Party Conference brought this theoretical crisis into the open, entrenched the main battle lines, and established the principal elements of the revisionist position.

== Crisis in the economic theories of Marxism ==
The debate over the economic dilemmas of Marxism came to the forefront after several articles by Conrad Schmidt in 1897 and Bernstein in 1898 were published in German social-democratic journals. They questioned the validity of some Marxist tenets, pointed to the possible erroneous nature of materialism, and proposed to revise Marxism, eventually asserting that many of Karl Marx’s economic anticipations were not borne out by the expectations presented in Das Kapital and elsewhere. Bernstein and other Marxist revisionists addressed a number of issues that focused on the perceived deficiencies of Marx’s economic predictions. One of the first issues addressed was the Marxian prediction that industrial capitalism would lead to concentration and centralization. Bernstein observed that ownership of businesses had become more diffuse instead of being concentrated in few hands.

In his attempt to prove that industrial concentration was not increasing, Bernstein wrote that "it is a well-established fact that in a whole series of branches of industry small and medium-sized undertakings appear quite capable of existing beside the large industries." Bernstein also attempted to demonstrate empirically that huge firms were not as profitable as small-scale ones, arguing that all sizes of companies could survive well together. Bernstein challenged orthodox Marxist theories that capitalism was doomed to fail, commenting that capitalism was increasingly overcoming a number of its frailties, "such as unemployment, overproduction, and the inequitable distribution of wealth." Moreover, Bernstein said that the apparent stabilization of capitalism was not temporary but a permanent feature.

Bernstein contended that the income of the proletariat was rising, which he said directly contradicted proletarization and the immiseration thesis, Marx's conjecture that workers would become poorer due to capitalism's insoluble contradictions, oppression of workers and oppressed class mold, and profit-based structure. Due to his empirical approach, Bernstein took the position that economic prosperity under capitalism was causing a reduction in class conflict, as well as increasing the differentiation of the working class. Bernstein predicted that class antagonism would eventually diminish in a capitalist society whereas socialism would evolve peacefully under parliamentary and reformist responses.

One of the first serious detractors of Bernstein's reformist socialism and optimistic stance towards capitalism was Alexander Parvus, a Marxist theoretician. Parvus contended that Bernstein was attempting to "overthrow socialism". In one of his 1898 essays, Parvus critically examined the significance of Bernstein's revisionism, writing: "What would be the point of striving to achieve political power if it only led to a 'colossal defeat'? What would be the point of opposing capitalism if we could not manage without it? Instead we would have to encourage capitalist development, since, if it is not interrupted by general trade crises, it must eventually lead to the prosperity of all!" There were also a number of other economic dilemmas facing orthodox Marxism in the late 1890s. David Ramsey Steele, a former member of the Socialist Party of Great Britain, summed up many of those he saw as the most serious conditions behind the crises that plagued Marxism, stating: "The workers were becoming richer, the working class was fragmented into sections with different interests, technological advance was accelerating rather than meeting a roadblock, the 'rate of profit' was not falling [referencing the falling rate of profit], the number of wealthy investors ('magnates of capital') was not falling but increasing, industrial concentration was not increasing, and in all countries the workers were putting their country above their class."

== Bernstein and the Precondition of Socialism ==
In his 1899 Precondition of Socialism, Bernstein treated the theoretical parts of Marxist doctrine as "not scientific but doctrinaire", therefore rejecting the fundamental principle of scientific socialism. Instead, Bernstein evoked Kantian liberal ideals that promoted ethical and moral arguments in favor of socialism. As Bernstein highlighted under the concept of ethical socialism, he said that "no action on the part of the masses" could have a "lasting effect without a moral impetus". He also proposed the abandonment of the Georg Wilhelm Friedrich Hegel-derived dialectic and revolution itself, ushered in the first post-Marxism era. According to Henry Tudor and J. M. Tudor, Bernstein's rationale to reform Marxism was to secure "the rights of individuals and promoting their material wellbeing without undermining their independence." He believed that the predominant problem of socialism was to "prevent the sheer size of the modern state from submerging the individual and nullifying democratic control".

== Breakdown controversy ==
The crisis of Marxism encompassed the "Breakdown Controversy", which was an argument among Karl Kautsky and orthodox Marxists and Bernstein, and revisionists over the predicted breakdown of capitalism due to its internal contradictions. Orthodox Marxists held the opinion that capitalism's collapse was imminent, which would result in a revolutionary conjuncture. Opposed to revolutionary tactics, Bernstein argued that revolution was only justified if capitalism falls of its own accord. He said that if capitalism fails to self-destruct under the crisis of capital, as he said was predicted by Marx, Bernstein and Marxist reformers believed that a transition to socialism could be accomplished through the existing political structure. To the consternation of orthodox Marxists, the contradiction of capitalism did not result in the worsening of economic conditions, pitting socialist theory against empirical data. In this debate, Kautsky, considered the pope of socialism, maintained that the Marxist revolution did not demand the economic breakdown of capitalism. In contrast, Bernstein conceived evolutionary socialism as an approach to Marxism that saw the pathway to socialism as reformist and evolutionary, minus what he saw as the chaos and violence of revolution.

== Conclusions ==
The consequences that followed the crisis of Marxism led to the birth of revisionist Marxism, which subsequently resulted in the emergence of the social democracy movement, considered a turning point when Bernstein challenged the central precepts of socialist revolution. The final political schism over Marxist revisionism ruptured after the Russian Revolution of 1917, where the social democratic parties discarded militant revolutionary in support of parliamentary reformation whilst still declaring their dedication to socialization. Social democracy advocated an evolutionary transformation of the private-based economy to a socialist mode of production via established political processes under social reform of capitalism. In retaliation, Joseph Stalin unleashed a series of attacks against Marxist reformers and social democrats, declaring in 1924: "Social democracy is objectively the moderate wing of fascism.... These organisations are not antipodes, they are twins." Later on, before the popular front years, Stalin, Grigory Zinoviev, and the Communist International (Comintern) applied the term social fascists to the various independent social democratic parties, especially in Germany.

Ever since the 1890s, numerous periods were under a continuing crisis of Marxist theory, including the early 1930s where German Marxist theoretician Karl Korsch warned that "Marxism today is in the midst of an historical and theoretical crisis. It is not simply a crisis within the 'Marxist movement', but a crisis of 'Marxism itself.'" Others have argued that Marxism has been in a continuous state of crisis throughout the 20th century. After the dissolution of the Soviet Union in 1991, a general Marxist crisis emerged that some argued was due to what they saw as the rejection of Marxism by "millions of workers as an obstacle rather than a help to their struggles."
