= Class collaboration =

Principle promoting collaboration between social classes

Class collaboration is the act of social or economic classes working together toward a certain goal. It is the goal of numerous political ideologies, including corporatism, and a feature of the Nordic model.

== In fascism ==
Class collaboration is one of the main pillars of social architecture in fascism, particularly Italian fascism. In the words of Benito Mussolini, fascism "affirms the irremediable, fruitful, and beneficent inequality of men". Given this premise, fascists conclude that the preservation of social hierarchy is in all of the classes' interests and therefore all classes should collaborate in its defense: the lower and the higher classes should accept their roles and perform their respective duties.

In fascist thought, the principle of class collaboration is combined with ultranationalism. The stability and the prosperity of the nation was seen as the ultimate purpose of collaboration between classes.

Some versions of class collaboration are associated with an economic model in which the state, assumed to have a non-class character, would mediate between different social classes (primarily between employers and employees). Among other things, such mediation would entail disallowing strikes by employees and lockouts by employers; setting up corporations as the representatives of given industries; and replacing independent labor unions with organizations under state control.

== In market economies ==
Modern social market economies tend to implement class collaboration as part of social corporatism. The development of social corporatism began in Norway and Sweden in the 1930s under the leadership of social democrats as a symbiosis of social democratic ideals and Keynesianism, and was consolidated in the 1960s and 1970s as the Nordic model. This form of corporatism is also referred to as neo-corporatism. Social corporatism later expanded to other Western European and Latin American countries with the spread of the welfare state, social market economies, and industrial unionism, in addition to local movements such as Peronism.

== Communist opposition ==
Marxists ideologically oppose class collaboration, advocating class struggle. Communists additionally favor the formation of a classless society.

The main Marxist criticism of class collaboration is that class collaboration assumes the state alone can reconcile class antagonism in society and that the strife that gives rise to socialism can be harmonised. For Marxists, the capitalist state is a tool used by the bourgeois class, meaning that the state will inevitably favor the employers over employees in class disputes.

Some Marxists use the term "class collaboration" pejoratively to describe working-class organisations that do not pursue class struggle. In this sense, the term has connotations of collaborationism. In the 1930s, social democracy was labeled social fascism by the Communist International, which maintained that social democracy was a variant of fascism because it shared a corporatist economic model and additionally stood in the way of transitioning to socialism and communism.

At the same time, communists do not reject all alliances between classes. Some communists argue that in a country with a large peasant population, the transition to communism can be accomplished by an alliance between two classes, the peasantry and the proletariat, united against the bourgeois class. Mao Zedong's New Democracy concept calls for "the peasantry, the proletariat, the petty bourgeoisie and national and patriotic elements from the bourgeoisie to collectively operate for the building of a socialist society".

== See also ==
- Bourgeois nationalism
- Bourgeois socialism
- Burgfriedenspolitik
- Corporatism
- Labor aristocracy
- Nordic model
- Professional–managerial class
- Proprietary Corporation
- Volksgemeinschaft
- Welfare chauvinism

== Sources ==
- Haro, Lea (2011). "Entering a Theoretical Void: The Theory of Social Fascism and Stalinism in the German Communist Party". Critique: Journal of Socialist Theory. 39 (4). Glasgow, Scotland: Glasgow University Press: 563–582. doi:10.1080/03017605.2011.621248. S2CID 146848013.
- Hoppe, Bert (2011). In Stalins Gefolgschaft: Moskau und die KPD 1928–1933 (in German). Munich, Germany: R. Oldenbourg Verlag. ISBN 9783486711738.
- Moschonas, Gerassimos (2002). In the Name of Social Democracy: The Great Transformation, 1945 to the Present. Translated by Elliott, Gregory. London, England: Verso Books. ISBN 978-1-85984-639-1.
