= Corporatism =

Political ideology which advocates the organization of society by corporate groups

Emblems used by medieval German guilds and corporations, displaying various symbols related to their professions

Corporatism is a political ideology and political system of interest representation and policymaking whereby corporate groups, such as agricultural, labour, military, business, scientific, or guild associations, come together and negotiate contracts or policy (collective bargaining) on the basis of their common interests. The term is derived from the Latin corpus, or "body".

Corporatism does not refer to a political system dominated by large business interests, even though the latter are commonly called "corporations" in modern American vernacular and legal parlance. Instead, the correct term for that system would be corporatocracy.

Corporatism developed during the 1850s in response to the rise of classical liberalism and Marxism, and advocated cooperation between the classes instead of class struggle. Adherents of diverse ideologies, including economic liberalism, fascism, and social democracy, have advocated for corporatist models. Corporatism became a main tenet of Italian fascism, and Benito Mussolini's Fascist regime in Italy advocated the total integration of divergent interests into the state for the common good. However, the more democratic neo-corporatism often embraced tripartism.

Corporatist ideas have been expressed since ancient Greek and Roman societies, and have been integrated into Catholic social teaching and Christian democratic political parties. Advocates have implemented them across societies with a wide range of political systems, including authoritarianism, absolutism, fascism, liberalism, and social democracy.

== Kinship corporatism ==
Kinship-based corporatism emphasizing clan, ethnic and family identification has been a common phenomenon in Africa, Asia, and Latin America. Confucian societies based upon families and clans in Eastern and Southeast Asia have been considered types of corporatism. Islamic societies often feature strong clans which form the basis for a community-based corporatist society.

== Politics and political economy ==
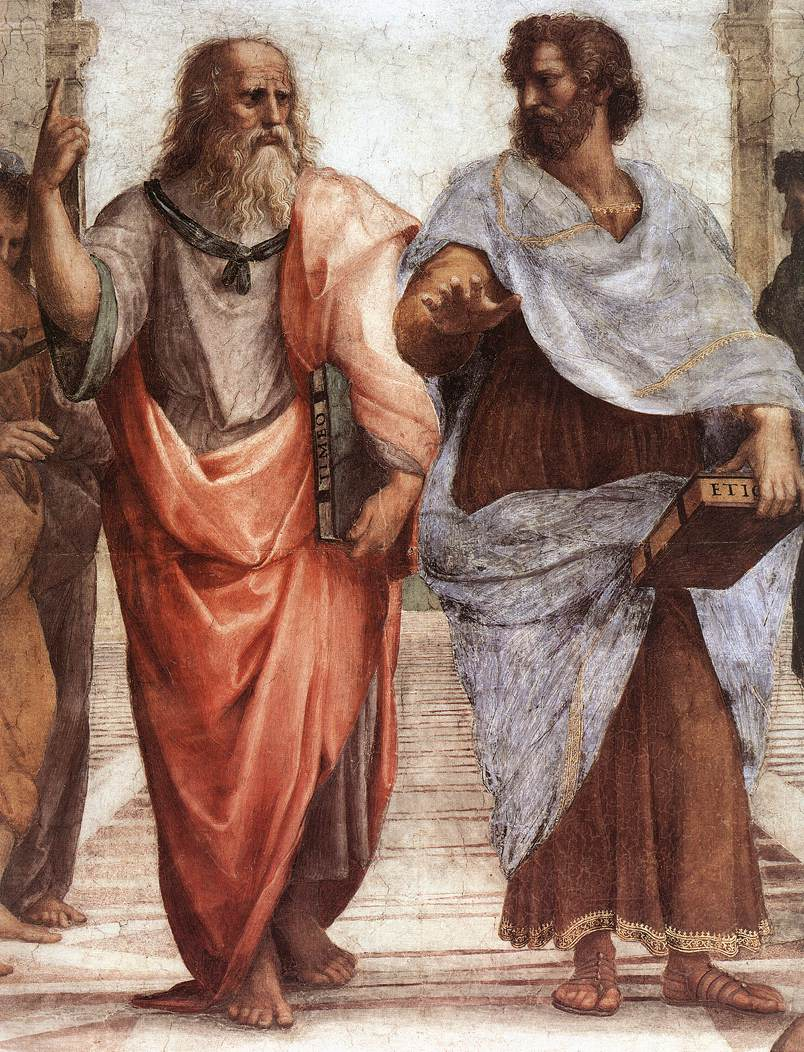
Plato (left) and Aristotle (right)

=== Communitarian corporatism ===
Early concepts of corporatism evolved in Classical Greece. Plato developed the concept of a totalitarian and communitarian corporatist system of natural-based classes and natural social hierarchies that would be organized based on function, such that groups would cooperate to achieve social harmony by emphasizing collective interests while rejecting individual interests.

In Politics, Aristotle described society as being divided between natural classes and functional purposes: those of priests, rulers, slaves and warriors. Ancient Rome adopted Greek concepts of corporatism into its own version of corporatism, adding the concept of political representation on the basis of function that divided representatives into military, professional and religious groups and set up institutions for each group known as collegia.

After the 5th-century fall of Rome and the beginning of the Early Middle Ages, corporatist organizations in western Europe became largely limited to religious orders and to the idea of Christian brotherhood—especially within the context of economic transactions. From the High Middle Ages onward, corporatist organizations became increasingly common in Europe, including such groups as religious orders, monasteries, fraternities, military orders such as the Knights Templar and the Teutonic Order, educational organizations such as the emerging European universities and learned societies, the chartered towns and cities, and most notably the guild system which dominated the economies of population centers in Europe. The military orders notably gained prominence during the period of the Crusades. These corporatist systems co-existed with the governing medieval estates system, and members of the first estate (the clergy), the second estate (the aristocracy), and third estate (the common people) could also participate in various corporatist bodies. The development of the guild system involved the guilds gaining the power to regulate trade and prices, and guild members included artisans, tradesmen, and other professionals. This diffusion of power is an important aspect of corporatist economic models of economic management and class collaboration. However, from the 16th century onward, absolute monarchies began to conflict with the diffuse, decentralized powers of the medieval corporatist bodies. Absolute monarchies during the Renaissance and Enlightenment gradually subordinated corporatist systems and corporate groups to the authority of centralized and absolutist governments, removing any checks on royal power these corporatist bodies had previously utilized.

After the outbreak of the French Revolution (1789), the existing absolutist corporatist system in France was abolished due to its endorsement of social hierarchy and special "corporate privilege". The new French government considered corporatism's emphasis on group rights as inconsistent with the government's promotion of individual rights. Subsequently, corporatist systems and corporate privilege throughout Europe were abolished in response to the French Revolution. From 1789 to the 1850s, most supporters of corporatism were reactionaries. A number of reactionary corporatists favoured corporatism in order to end liberal capitalism and to restore the feudal system. Countering the reactionaries were the ideas of Henri de Saint-Simon (1760- 1825), whose proposed "industrial class" would have had the representatives of various economic groups sit in the political chambers, in contrast to the popular representation of liberal democracy.

=== Expedient corporatism ===
In Confederate Political Economy (2016), Michael Brem Bonner argues that the Confederate States of America used ad hoc means based on wartime contingencies to create an "expedient" corporatist state to support the Southern war effort for the four years of the American Civil War (1861–1865). Bonner claims that this makes the Confederacy "one of the world's first examples of a corporatist political economy," albeit one which was not created deliberately. "What began as an experiment with new modes of organization," Bonner writes, "evolved into a centralized state that implemented policies to deal with each new emerging crisis with the available economic, industrial, political, and human resources at hand. Confederate political and economic systems were directly shaped by the rapidly changing circumstances of war."

The use of "expedient" is intended by Bonner to emphasize the importance that immediate wartime needs played in each governmental decision leading to a corporatist state, and to de-emphasize overarching intentionality in those decisions. Bonner is insistent that even though expedient corporatism involved ownership by the Confederate government of important foundries, arsenals and factories, it is not "state socialism" because it was not part of an predetermined plan, but came about on an "as needed" basis. Indeed, several facilities were offered for sale to Jefferson Davis' government, but were rejected after inspection by Josiah Gorgas's Ordnance Department. Other historians, such as Louise B. Hill and Raimondo Luraghi, argue the case for the Confederate nationalization of industries being "an example of nineteenth-century state socialism".

In Bonner's view,

The Confederacy was not a nineteenth-century aberration but the first of many modern conservative countrrevolutionary movements to battle the rise of liberalism and unfettered industrial capitalism. Confederate leaders attempted to break away from the liberal democracy of the North and preserve their peculiar vision of republican government. In the process, they created a centralized modern government with expedient corporatist qualities.

=== Social corporatism ===
From the 1850s onward, progressive corporatism developed in response to classical liberalism and to Marxism. Progressive corporatists supported providing group rights to members of the middle and working classes in order to secure cooperation among the classes in opposition to the Marxist conception of class struggle. By the 1870s and 1880s, corporatism experienced a revival in Europe with the formation of trade unions committed to negotiations with employers.

In his 1887 work Gemeinschaft and Gesellschaft ("Community and Society"), Ferdinand Tönnies began a major revival of corporatist philosophy associated with the development of neo-medievalism, increasing promotion of guild socialism and causing major changes to sociological theory. Tönnies claims that organic communities based upon clans, communes, families and professional groups are disrupted by the mechanical society of economic classes imposed by capitalism.

The German Nazi Party used Tönnies' theory to promote their notion of Volksgemeinschaft ("people's community"). However, Tönnies opposed Nazism: he joined the Social Democratic Party of Germany in 1932 to oppose fascism in Germany and was deprived of his honorary professorship by Adolf Hitler in 1933.

=== Corporatism in the Catholic Church ===
In 1881, Pope Leo XIII commissioned theologians and social thinkers to study corporatism and to provide a definition for it. In 1884 in Freiburg, the commission declared that corporatism was a "system of social organization that has at its base the grouping of men according to the community of their natural interests and social functions, and as true and proper organs of the state they direct and coordinate labor and capital in matters of common interest". Corporatism is related to the sociological concept of structural functionalism.

Corporatism's popularity increased in the late 19th century and a corporatist internationale was formed in 1890, followed by the 1891 publishing of Rerum novarum by the Catholic Church that for the first time declared the Church's blessing to trade unions and recommended that politicians recognize organized labour. Many corporatist unions in Europe were endorsed by the Catholic Church to challenge the anarchist, Marxist and other radical unions, with the corporatist unions being fairly conservative in comparison to their radical rivals. Some Catholic corporatist states include Austria under the 1932–1934 leadership of Federal Chancellor Engelbert Dollfuss and Ecuador under the leadership of García Moreno (1861–1865 and 1869–1875). The economic vision outlined in Rerum novarum and Quadragesimo anno (1931) also influenced the régime (1946–1955 and 1973–1974) of Juan Perón and Justicialism in Argentina and influenced the drafting of the 1937 Constitution of Ireland. In response to the Roman Catholic corporatism of the 1890s, Protestant corporatism developed, especially in Germany, the Netherlands and Scandinavia. However, Protestant corporatism has been much less successful in obtaining assistance from governments than its Roman Catholic counterpart.

=== Corporate solidarism ===
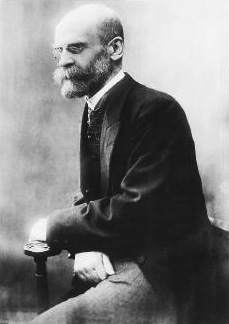
Émile Durkheim

Sociologist Émile Durkheim (1858–1917) advocated a form of corporatism termed "solidarism" that advocated creating an organic social solidarity of society through functional representation. Solidarism built on Durkheim's view that the dynamic of human society as a collective is distinct from the dynamic of an individual, in that society is what places upon individuals their cultural and social attributes.

Durkheim posited that solidarism would alter the division of labour by evolving it from mechanical solidarity to organic solidarity. He believed that the existing industrial capitalist division of labour caused "juridical and moral anomie", which had no norms or agreed procedures to resolve conflicts and resulted in chronic confrontation between employers and trade unions. Durkheim believed that this anomie caused social dislocation and felt that by this "it is the law of the strongest which rules, and there is inevitably a chronic state of war, latent or acute". As a result, Durkheim believed it is a moral obligation of the members of society to end this situation by creating a moral organic solidarity based upon professions as organized into a single public institution.

Corporate solidarism is a form of corporatism that advocates creating solidarity instead of collectivism in society through functional representation, believing that it is up to the people to end the chronic confrontation between employers and labor unions by creating a single public institution. Solidarism rejects a "materialistic" approach to social, economic, and political problems, while also rejecting class conflict. Just like corporatism, it embraces tripartism as its economic system.

=== Liberal corporatism ===
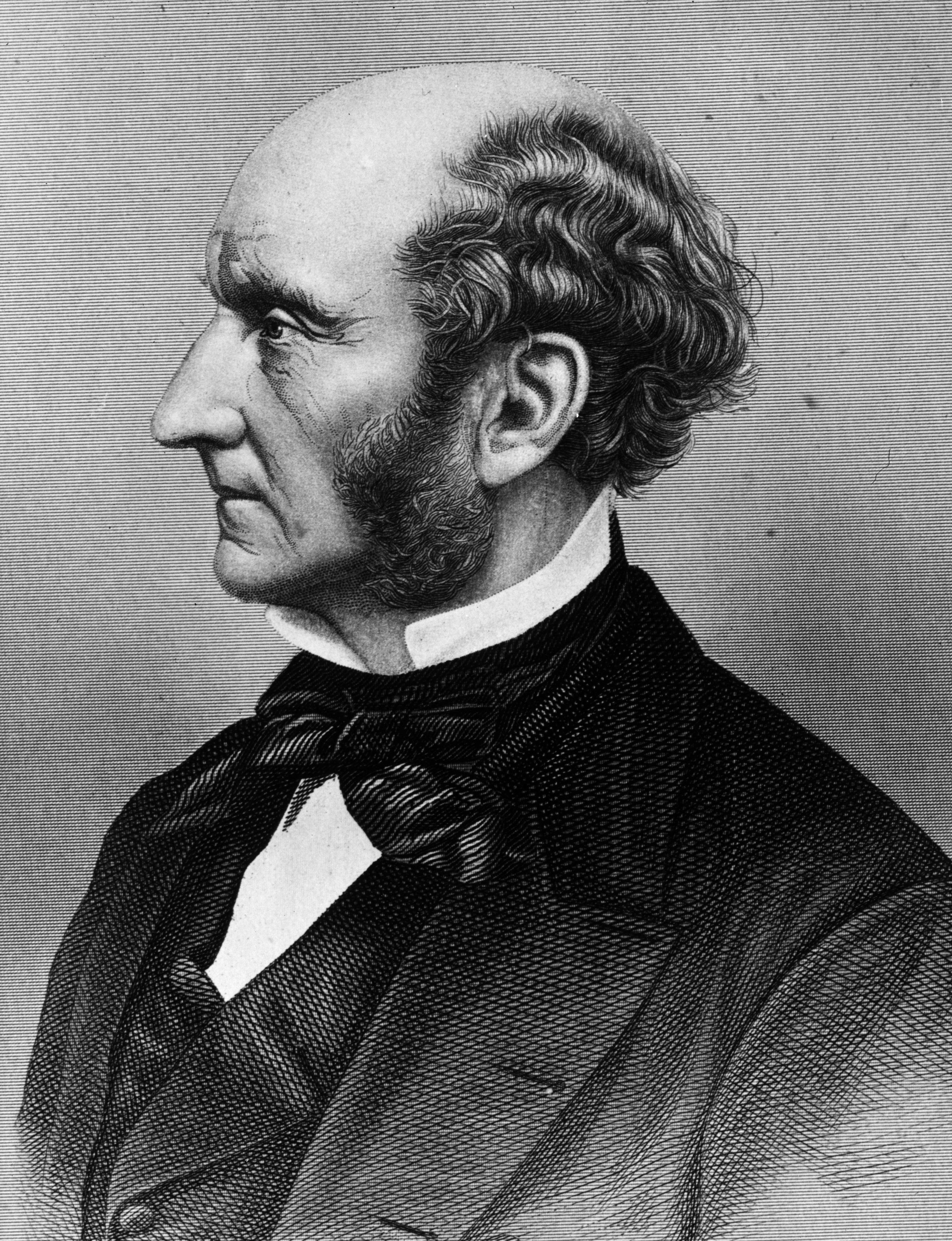
Portrait of John Stuart Mill

John Stuart Mill supported corporatism as needing to predominate in society to create equality for labourers and give them a voice in management through democratic economic rights. Unlike a number of other forms of corporatism, liberal corporatism does not reject markets or individualism, but rather believes that a business is a social institution that requires a recognition of the needs of its members. This liberal corporatist ethic was similar to Taylorism but called for democratisation of the firm and election of management.

Liberal corporatism was an influential component of the progressivism in the United States that has been referred to as "interest group liberalism". Labour leaders' and progressives' advocacy of liberal corporatism is believed to have been influenced in reaction to the rise of syndicalism and particularly anarcho-syndicalism at the time in Europe.

=== Fascist corporatism ===
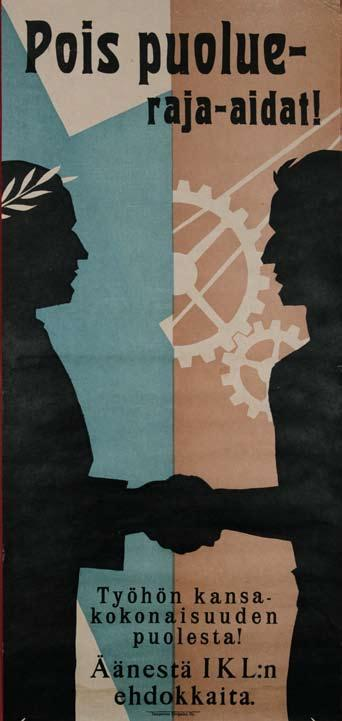
SKA poster: "Away with the party lines! Work for the national community!"

A fascist corporation can be defined as a government-directed confederation of employers and employees unions, with the aim of overseeing production in a comprehensive manner. Theoretically, each corporation within this structure assumes the responsibility of advocating for the interests of its respective profession, particularly through the negotiation of labor agreements and similar measures. Fascists theorized that this method could result in harmony amongst social classes.

In Italy, from 1922 until 1943, corporatism became influential amongst Italian nationalists led by Benito Mussolini. The 1920 Charter of Carnaro gained much popularity as the prototype of a "corporative state", having displayed much within its tenets as a guild system combining the concepts of autonomy and authority in a special synthesis. Alfredo Rocco spoke of a corporative state and declared corporatist ideology in detail. Rocco would later become a member of the Italian fascist régime. Subsequently, the Labour Charter of 1927 was implemented, thus establishing a collective agreement system between employers and employees, becoming the main form of class collaboration in the fascist government.

Italian fascism involved a corporatist political system in which the economy was collectively managed by employers, workers and state officials by formal mechanisms at the national level. Its supporters claimed that corporatism could better recognize or "incorporate" every divergent interest into the state organically, unlike majority-rules democracy, which (they said) could marginalize specific interests. This total consideration was the inspiration for their use of the term "totalitarian", described without coercion (which is connoted in the modern meaning) in the 1932 Doctrine of Fascism as thus:

When brought within the orbit of the State, Fascism recognizes the real needs which gave rise to socialism and trade unionism, giving them due weight in the guild or corporative system in which divergent interests are coordinated and harmonized in the unity of the State.

[The state] is not simply a mechanism which limits the sphere of the supposed liberties of the individual... Neither has the Fascist conception of authority anything in common with that of a police ridden State... Far from crushing the individual, the Fascist State multiplies his energies, just as in a regiment a soldier is not diminished but multiplied by the number of his fellow soldiers.

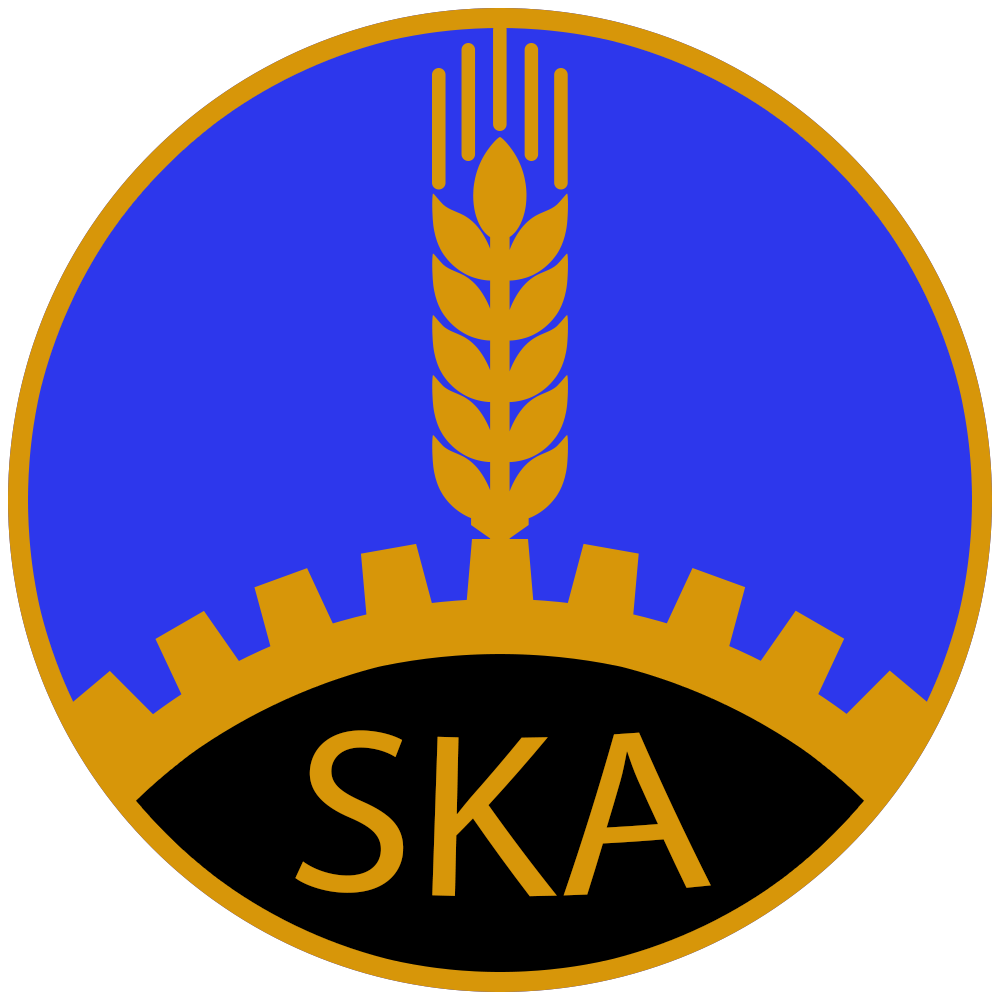
Fascist organizations aiming to unite employers and employees: German Labour Front (DAF), Spanish Syndical Organization (OSE), National Trade Union Confederation of Finland (SKA)

A popular slogan of the Italian Fascists under Mussolini was "Tutto nello Stato, niente al di fuori dello Stato, nulla contro lo Stato" ("everything within the state, nothing outside the state, nothing against the state").

Within the corporative model of Italian fascism, each corporate interest was supposed to be resolved and incorporated under the state. Much of the corporatist influence upon Italian fascism was partly due to the Fascists' attempts to gain endorsement by the Roman Catholic Church that itself sponsored corporatism. However, the Roman Catholic Church's corporatism favored a bottom-up corporatism, whereby groups such as families and professional groups would voluntarily work together, whereas fascist corporatism was a top-down model of state control managed primarily by government officials.

The fascist state corporatism of Roman Catholic Italy influenced the governments and economies – not only of other Roman Catholic-majority countries, such as the governments of Engelbert Dollfuss in Austria, António de Oliveira Salazar in Portugal, Juan Domingo Perón in Argentina and Getúlio Vargas in Brazil – but also of Konstantin Päts and Kārlis Ulmanis in non-Catholic Estonia and Latvia.

Fascists in non-Catholic countries also supported Italian Fascist corporatism, including Oswald Mosley of the British Union of Fascists, who commended corporatism and said that "it means a nation organized as the human body, with each organ performing its individual function but working in harmony with the whole". Mosley also regarded corporatism as an attack on laissez-faire economics and "international finance".

The corporatist state of Portugal had similarities to Benito Mussolini's Italian fascist corporatism, but also differences in its moral approach to governing. Although Salazar admired Mussolini and was influenced by his Labour Charter of 1927, he distanced himself from fascist dictatorship, which he considered a pagan Caesarist political system that recognised neither legal nor moral limits. Salazar also had a strong dislike of Marxism and liberalism.

In 1933, Salazar stated:

Our Dictatorship clearly resembles a fascist dictatorship in the reinforcement of authority, in the war declared against certain principles of democracy, in its accentuated nationalist character, in its preoccupation of social order. However, it differs from it in its process of renovation. The fascist dictatorship tends towards a pagan Caesarism, towards a state that knows no limits of a legal or moral order, which marches towards its goal without meeting complications or obstacles. The Portuguese New State, on the contrary, cannot avoid, not think of avoiding, certain limits of a moral order which it may consider indispensable to maintain in its favour of its reforming action.

The Patriotic People's Movement (IKL) in Finland envisioned a system with elements of direct democracy and professional parliament. The president would be elected with direct vote, who would then appoint the government from among professionals in their respective fields. All parties would be banned, and members of parliament would be elected by vote from corporate groups representing different sectors; Agriculture, Industry and Public servants, free trades, etc. Every law passed in the parliament would be either ratified or overturned by a referendum.

=== Neo-corporatism ===
During the post-World War II reconstruction period in Europe, corporatism was favored by Christian democrats (often under the influence of Catholic social teaching), national conservatives and social democrats in opposition to liberal capitalism. This type of corporatism became unfashionable but revived again in the 1960s and 1970s as "neo-corporatism" in response to the new economic threat of recession-inflation.

Neo-corporatism is a democratic form of corporatism which favors economic tripartism, which involves strong labour unions, employers' associations and governments that cooperate as "social partners" to negotiate and manage a national economy. Social corporatist systems instituted in Europe after World War II include the ordoliberal system of the social market economy in Germany, the social partnership in Ireland, the polder model in the Netherlands (although arguably the polder model already was present at the end of World War I, it was not until after World War II that a social-service system gained foothold there), the concertation system in Italy, the Rhine model in Switzerland and the Benelux countries and the Nordic model in the Nordic countries.

Attempts in the United States to create neo-corporatist capital-labor arrangements were unsuccessfully advocated by Gary Hart and Michael Dukakis in the 1980s. As secretary of labor during the Clinton administration, Robert Reich promoted neo-corporatist reforms.

=== Contemporary examples by country ===
==== Argentina ====
Juan Perón's governments are known for having corporatist elements. They aimed to represent the interests of different sectors of Argentine society by grouping them into multiple organizations: workers were represented by the CGT, Peronist businessmen in the General Economic Confederation, landowners by the Argentine Agrarian Federation, women by the Female Peronist Party, Jews in the Argentine Israelite Organization, students in the Secondary Student Union. Peron was able to coordinate and centralize the working class, which he mobilized to act on his behest. Trade unions have been incorporated into Peronism's structure and remain a key part of the movement today. Also, the state intervened in labor-capital conflicts, with the Ministry of Labour and Social Security being responsible for directly negotiating and enforcing agreements.

Also, the Onganía regime during the Argentine Revolution had a corporatist ideology, experimenting in particular in Córdoba under the governance of Carlos Caballero. Although in practice, it represented a type of exclusive corporatism, where only private interests were represented through organizations. They were given representation in the State in exchange for accepting certain controls. In reality, this led to many functions and structures of the State passing into private hands, but in an unbalanced way. Business and religious groups ended up taking control of important areas of the government. As a result, the state's ability to act independently and efficiently was greatly reduced, which also explains why resistance to these measures arose.

For instance, some Catholic fundamentalists were in the Ministry of Social Welfare (although with a short stay), such as Minister Roberto Petracca and the Secretary of Promotion and Community Assistance (SEPAC), Roberto Gorostiaga. Both were Catholic militants, members of Ciudad Católica, of the Verbo Magazine and followers of Jacques de Mahieu. Together with these, in 1967, there were also other types of Catholic groups in the Ministry of Social Welfare, with social Christian principles and modernizing for the time. In this spectrum were the minister, Julio Álvarez, the secretary of SEPAC, Raúl Puigbó, the undersecretary of SEPAC, Antonio Critto, and the undersecretary of Security.

Thus, the integration of the ministries offers a clear example of the corporatist element of this period. Especially, as it opened institutional areas to the representation of some interests of civil society. However, this opening occurred selectively, including mainly groups that already supported the government. The private actors that were incorporated had a limited role, as they could only provide information and technical advice, since this was considered to be the best form of participation.

==== China ====
Jonathan Unger and Anita Chan in their essay "China, Corporatism, and the East Asian Model" describe Chinese corporatism as follows:

[A]t the national level the state recognizes one and only one organization (say, a national labour union, a business association, a farmers' association) as the sole representative of the sectoral interests of the individuals, enterprises or institutions that comprise that organization's assigned constituency. The state determines which organizations will be recognized as legitimate and forms an unequal partnership of sorts with such organizations. The associations sometimes even get channelled into the policy-making processes and often help implement state policy on the government's behalf.

By establishing itself as the arbiter of legitimacy and assigning responsibility for a particular constituency with one sole organization, the state limits the number of players with which it must negotiate its policies and co-opts their leadership into policing their own members. This arrangement is not limited to economic organizations such as business groups and social organizations.

The political scientist Jean C. Oi coined the term "local state corporatism" to describe China's distinctive type of state-led growth, in which a communist party-state with Leninist roots commits itself to policies which are friendly to the market and to growth.

The use of corporatism as a framework to understand the central state's behaviour in China has been criticized by authors such as Bruce Gilley and William Hurst.

==== Hong Kong and Macau ====
In two special administrative regions, some legislators are chosen by functional constituencies (Legislative Council of Hong Kong) where the voters are a mix of individuals, associations, and corporations or indirect election (Legislative Assembly of Macau) where a single association is designated to appoint legislators.

==== Ireland ====
Most members of the Seanad Éireann, the upper house of the Oireachtas (parliament) of Ireland, are elected as part of vocational panels nominated partly by current Oireachtas members and partly by vocational and special interest associations. The Seanad also includes two university constituencies.

The Constitution of Ireland of 1937 was influenced by Roman Catholic Corporatism as expressed in the papal encyclical, Quadragesimo anno (1931).

==== Netherlands ====
Under the Dutch polder model, the Social and Economic Council of the Netherlands (Sociaal-Economische Raad, SER) was established by the 1950 Industrial Organisation Act (Wet op de bedrijfsorganisatie). It is led by representatives of unions, employer organizations, and government appointed experts. It advises the government and has administrative and regulatory power. It oversees Sectoral Organisation Under Public Law (Publiekrechtelijke Bedrijfsorganisatie, PBO) which are similarly organized by union and industry representatives, but for specific industries or commodities.

==== Slovenia ====
The Slovene National Council, the upper house of the Slovene Parliament, has 18 members elected on a corporatist basis.

==== Western Europe ====
Generally supported by nationalist and social-democratic political parties, social corporatism developed in the post-World War II period, influenced by Christian democrats and social democrats in Western European countries such as Austria, Germany, the Netherlands, Denmark, Finland, Norway and Sweden. Social corporatism has also been adopted in different configurations and to varying degrees in various Western European countries.

The Nordic countries have the most comprehensive form of collective bargaining, where trade unions are represented at the national level by official organizations alongside employers' associations. Together with the welfare state policies of these countries, this forms what is termed the Nordic model. Austria, however, exhibits an equally comprehensive but more sectorally organized system of collective bargaining, supported by a highly institutionalized framework of social partnership. A less extensive model exists in Germany (Rhine capitalism).

== See also ==
- Class collaboration
- Co-determination
- Conflict theories
- Corporate statism
- Cooperative
- Distributism
- Gemeinschaft and Gesellschaft
- Gremialismo
- Holacracy
- Managerialism
- Mutualism (movement)
- Integralism
- National syndicalism
- Oligopoly
- Paritarian Institutions
- Pillarisation
- Solidarism (disambiguation)
- Third Position
- Proprietary corporation
- Corporatism in Switzerland
